= Speckled Wood, Hastings =

Woodland area in East Sussex, United Kingdom

Speckled Wood
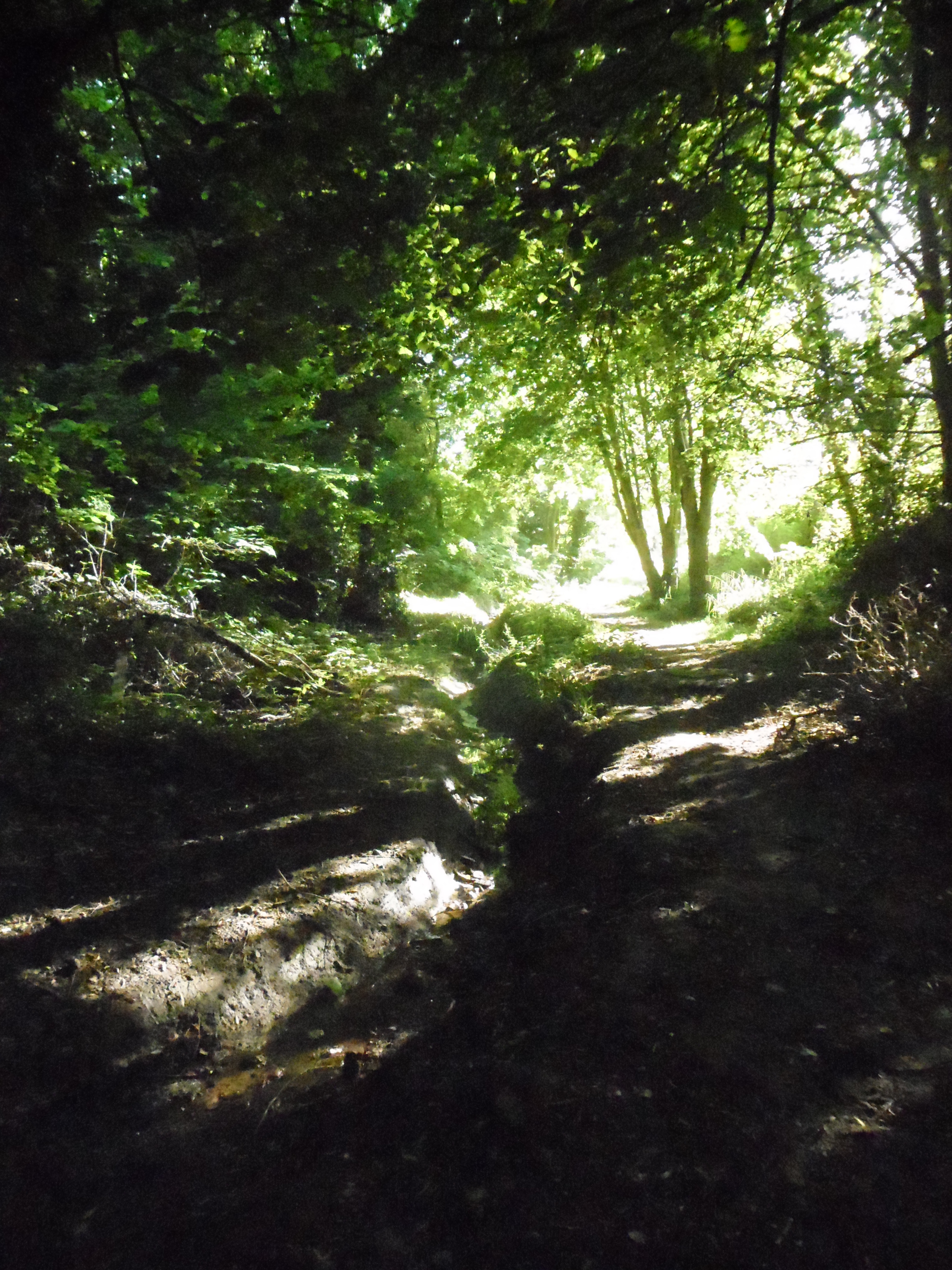

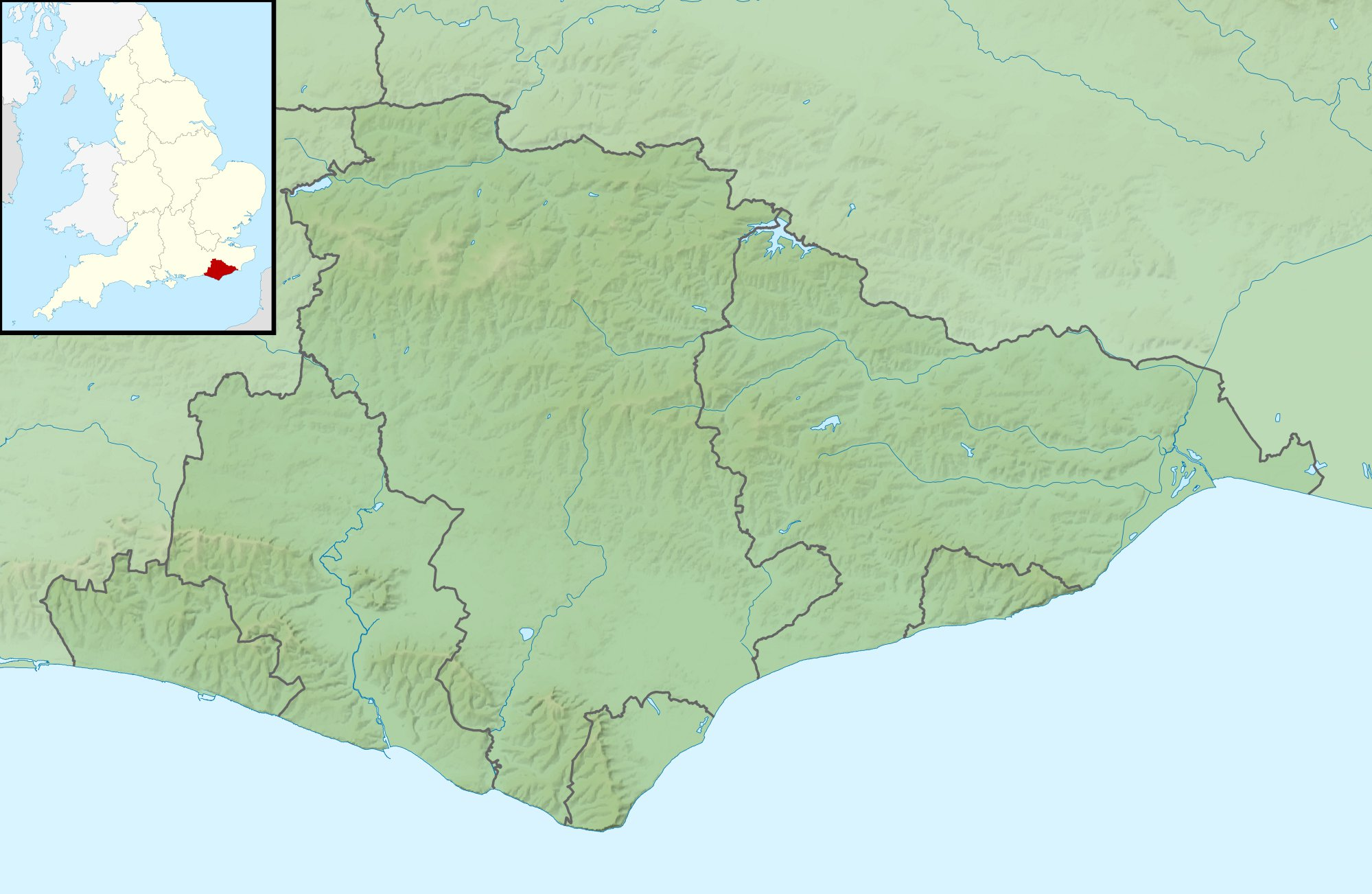
- Location within East Sussex
- Type: Woodland, park
- Location: 128 Frederick Road, Ore TN35 5EU, Hastings, East Sussex United Kingdom
- OS grid: TQ834112
- Coordinates: 50°52′18″N 0°36′19″E
- Area: 12.7 acres (5.1 ha)
- Created: 1778 or earlier
- Open: 7 days a week, dawn until dusk
- Status: Open all year

Speckled Wood is a 12.7-acre (5.1 ha) woodland and park in Ore Village in the Ore Valley, Hastings, East Sussex, United Kingdom. The woodland park consists of woodland trails and clearings. The woodland has steep sixty-degree sides and is a wet woodland.

The wood is a habitat to a wealth of mammals, birds and invertebrates. There is a stream that runs right through the wood. The name Speckled Wood is believed to have come from the butterflies of the same name that thrive here, the speckled wood (SP1861).

Speckled Wood falls within Ore's development area to the northeast of Hastings, where major housing and industrial development has been concentrated during the last two decades. Despite considerable new development in the area, the woodland has been retained since 1930.

Speckled Wood, together with nearby fragments of woodland and tree belts, represents a sizeable proportion of green space within the urban area of Hastings and is a conspicuous landscape feature. It is a core area of natural habitat within the town. It is possible to enter the natural area from points within Ore Village using the long established footpaths.

== History ==
The Yeakell and Gardners 1778 Sussex map shows the area to be a historic woodland.

Maps from 1873 to 1875 show the Ore Stream running under Cackle Street (now Frederick Road) and further into the valley. It also mentions the stream and narrow band of woodland surrounded by farm land which was part of the Vine Farm Estate. This was eventually sold by Messrs Woodhams & Son by Auction in Havelock Road 5 June 1889.

At around 1897, it is believed that the area 50°55′46.42″N 0°36′35.56″E (TQ835177) which is part of Speckled Wood may have been used as a brick field, run by a Mr W. Rodgers. This site was described as 7 acres (2.8 ha); although the record of this is documented in a book, it is believed to come from a piece of paperwork detailing a rate payment, which does not actually prove bricks were produced from the site. It is clear that Mr W Rodgers had other brick fields in the surrounding area of Ore Village.

In 1916 and up until 1921, at least 20 plots of land in the woodland known at that time as the Oller' were sold by a generous land owner, Mrs Elisabeth Peddlesden and her husband Joeseph, for use by the Soldiers' and Sailors' Families' Association and Small Holdings Committee as part of the Land Settlement (Facilities) Act 1919 to give small holdings to returning World War I soldiers settling in the South East. This was originally organized by the National Freehold Land Company. Many of these records have been transferred to the Keep in Brighton. The small holdings were used to keep pigs and chickens mainly, and thought to provide a working living for the soldiers, many of which had returned from the war with injuries from mustard gas.

As early as 1927 the Hastings Observer reported that Town Planning was working with councillors to produce a comprehensive report towards housing and leisure facilities. The town was to be re mapped and designated housing and recreational areas were to be created.

In 1930 the area was subject to the Hastings General Development Plan 1930. A large proportion of the woodland we know to day was declared as green-space. The map in the rear pocket of this Management Plan shows the area as a public-open-space

In 1934 the Town and Planning Committee reported that during their meeting of the Hastings Council they had prepared and estimate for the cost of purchasing the land and public-open-space Speckled Wood as shown in the General Development Plan.

Friends of Speckled Wood Management Trust petitioned to keep the entire woodland undeveloped. Friends of Speckled Wood (FOSWMT) presented this public response to the Hastings Borough Council Cabinet. On 12 November 2012, the Hastings Cabinet Councillors were unable to name the entire area as a Nature Reserve, but did keep "a substantial area of land...as woodland instead of potential housing".

A public enquiry was held during 2014/2015 and the inspector recommended that the majority of Speckled Wood should be re-designated as protected open space. This was ratified by Hastings Borough Council during the latter part of 2015.

In 2017, Hastings Borough Council handed over two plots of land to local charity, Ore Community Land Trust, as the first step in establishing the wood as a permanent local amenity.

== Geology and geography ==
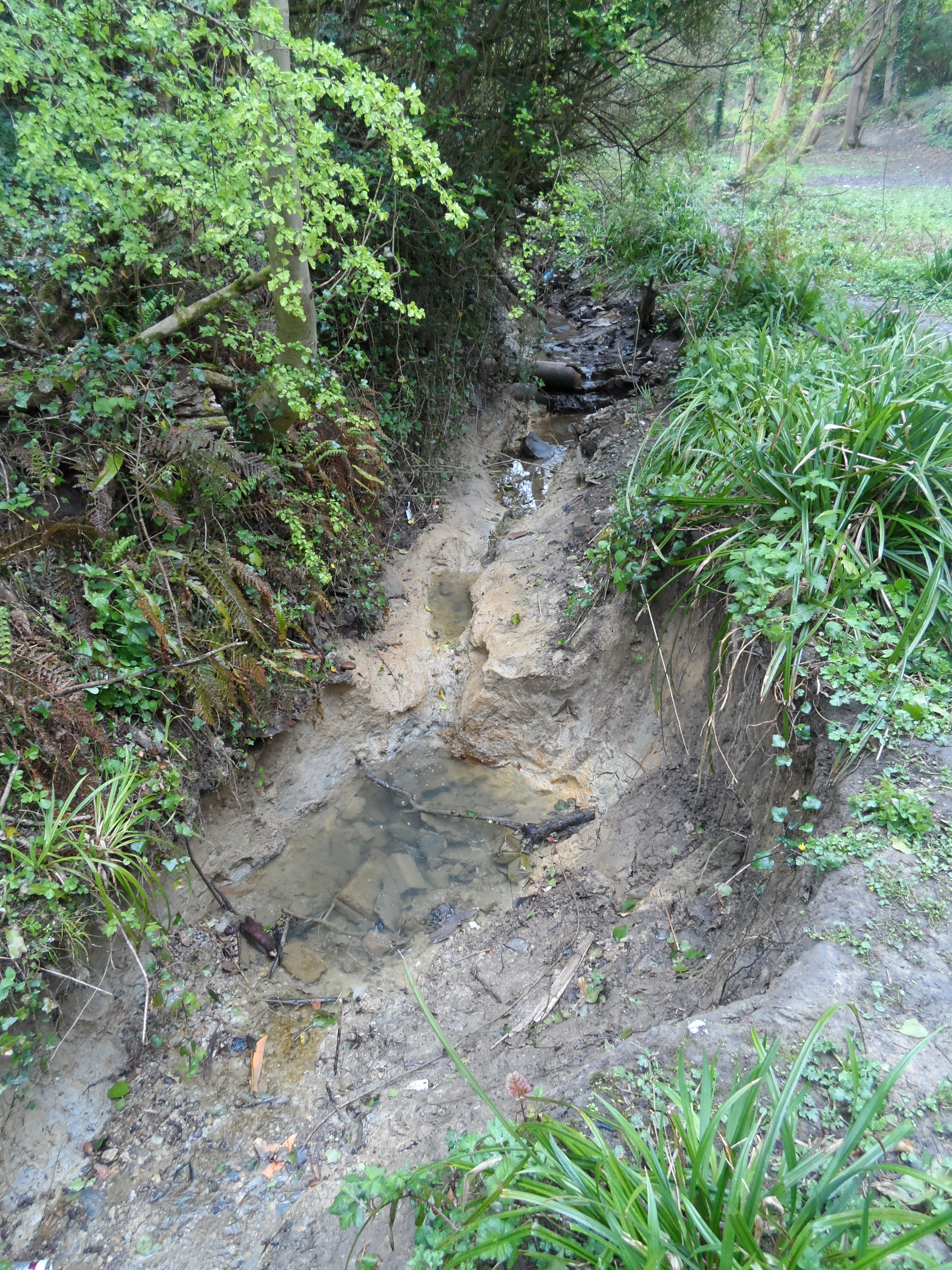
The Ore Valley Stream in Hastings, East Sussex from a geological perspective is made from clays and sandstone in its base

From a geological perspective, the area along the stream is on the sandstone of the Ashdown Beds and this is surrounded by clays and mudstones, also of the Ashdown series all laid down in the Cretaceous Period. Several valleys run from The Ridge to the sea from the Marline Wood area in the west to the Country Park in the east.

The Speckled Wood valley is part of the catchment that includes St Helens Park and Old Roar Ghyll.

Speckled Wood can be seen as historic from the Yeakell and Gardners 1778 Sussex map showing the 'Oller' this shows a ribbon of woodland along the Ore stream, The ancient wooded ghylls around Hastings of which the Speckled Wood area is the only remaining part of one which started from the area known as North Seat then through to the ponds which were in the area of what is now the Leeds Close garages of Victoria Avenue in Hastings, and then in south westerly direction right down to what is now Alexandra Park in Hastings.

The Upper Ore Valley to date has steep sixty-degree valleys or inclines to the north, east and west. The stream cuts right through the lower valley exposing the Ashdown bed in sections along the valley floor. To the west the incline falls off to a plateau which then rises to land level. The North End of the Upper Valley has been topographically mapped to reveal its slopes. This was created by a group of volunteers that made a model from MDF based on height readings from the Valley floor. The ghyll forms a link within the Hastings green corridor both spatially and as a means to prevent further fragmentation of flora and fauna.

=== Ore Valley Stream ===
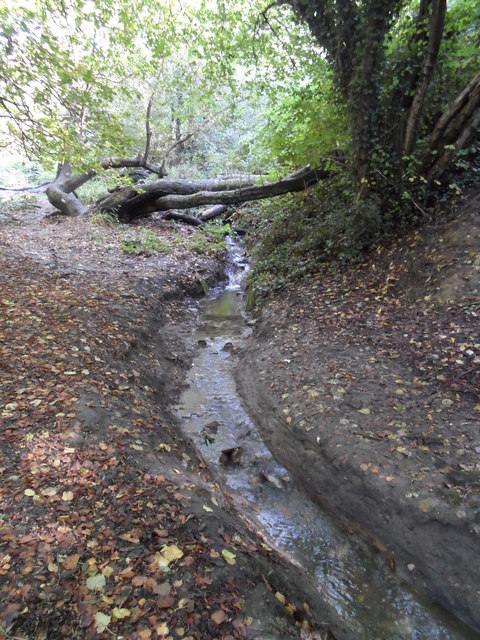
Ore Valley stream

The Ore stream through Speckled Wood is an integral part of one of the few remaining currently-undeveloped wooded ghylls left in Hastings.

The Ore Valley stream runs from the Bourne spring feed splitting on the North Seat in Country Park. It runs under Southview Close and through Speckled Wood where it eventually feeds into Alexandra Park stream.

There is a colony of Arum italicum ssp. italicum ("Italian lords-and-ladies") at 50°52′24.72″N 0°36′26.02″E (TQ8353411464) close to the bottom of the steps leading from Victoria Avenue into Speckled Wood. It is distinct from ordinary cuckoopint as the leaves appear in the autumn. They are plain green in this British form and without the whitish veins of some more popular garden varieties from abroad and which are usually encountered as throw-outs.

There is Hirudo medicinalis and Lymnaea in the stream.

== Wildlife ==
Speckled Wood is a mix of old woodland, Victorian garden survivors, it shares common taxon as ancient woodland according to the Ancient Woodland Vascular Plant indicators on page 27 of the Hastings Borough Council Ancient Woodland Report by P Sansum This ancient woodland status is yet to be recognised . It is one of the only deep sided wet woods to remain in East Sussex, with over 200 species of trees and flowering plants. Sussex Biodiversitry Record Centre - SxBRCReport_SpeckledWood Many rare and scarce liverworts, mosses and lichens occur within the ghyll. Hastings Borough Council Statements A multitude of fungi, rare insects, birds and elusive woodland mammals including the wood mouse.

There is a blanket TPO Tree Protection Order ref TPO NO 157, W1 on the trees in the woodland. These are mostly ash, hawthorn, holly, pedunculate oak, sycamore and goat willow all identified in the Thomson Ecology Arboricultural Survey 2007. This survey only dealt with the top half of the woodland but clearly stated that there are trees which were grade B, whilst some categorised as C1.

=== Species ===
The species list of flora and fauna are being added as new species are noted and photographed in the woodland. The data is also being updated on iRecord and the 2014 study

The area has a large quantity of invasive Japanese knotweed (Reynoutria japonica) and Himalayan balsam which occurs in at least seventy-two separate areas of substantial size. The study was first conducted photographically, identifying the seventy-two separate large areas, which were then mapped onto an existing pathway map. The rhizome area was then estimated at seven square metres in accordance with Environment Department guidelines, from where rhizomes had been discovered in soil during clearance work.

Fauna

- 16-spot orange ladybird (Propylea quatuordecimpunctata)
- Thirteen-spotted lady beetle (Hippodamia tredecimpunctata)
- Black-billed magpie (Pica pica)
- Blue tit (Cyanistes caeruleus)
- The comma Butterfly (Polygonia c-album)
- Common earwig (Forficula auricularia)
- Common green darner (Anax junius)
- Common orb weaver (Metellina segmentata)
- Common rough woodlouse (Porcellio scaber)
- Common toad (Bufo bufo)
- Common woodlouse (Oniscus asellus)
- Common wood pigeon (Columba palumbus)
- Dark bush cricket (Pholidoptera griseoaptera)
- Dark bodied glass snail (Oxychilus draparnaudi)
- Eastern grey squirrel (Sciurus carolinensis)
- Eurasian jay (Garrulus glandarius)
- Freshwater shrimp (Gammarus)
- Fresh water leech (Hirudo medicinalis)
- Garden cross spider (Araneus diadematus)
- Garden orb weaver spider (Metellina segmentata)
- Golden pigmy (Stigmella aurella)
- Great pond snail (Limnaea)
- Great tit (Parus major)
- Harvestman spider (Opilio parietinus)
- Holly leaf miner (Phytomyza ilicis)
- Holly blue butterfly (Celastrina argiolus ssp. britanna)
- Native land snail (Phylum mollusca)
- Ichneumen wasp (Ichneumonidae)
- Large bee-fly, (Bombylius major)
- Lemon slug (Malacolimax tenellus)
- Leiobunum blackwalli (Phytomyza ilicis)
- Long-tailed tit (Aegithalos caudatus)
- Orange ladybird, 16-spot (Halyzia sedecimguttata)
- Palmate newt (Lissotriton helveticus)
- Pond skater (Gerridae)
- Red admiral butterfly (Vanessa atalanta)
- Red/brown fox (Vulpes vulpes)
- Rough woodlouse (Porcellio scaber)
- Serotine (Eptesicus serotinus)
- Speckled wood butterfly (Pararge aegeria)
- The comma butterfly (Polygonia c-album)
- Tree snail (Balea perversa)
- Tree snail (Oxychilus navarricus)
- Water hoglouse (Asellus aquaticus)
- White lipped bandit snail (Cepaea hortensis)

Flora

- Ash (Fraxinus excelsior)
- Alexanders (Smyrnium olusatrum)
- Beech (Fagus sylvatica)
- Native blue bells (Hyacinthoides non-scripta)
- Boxwood (Buxus sempervirens)
- Bramble (Rubus)
- Bristly oxtongue (Picris echioides)
- Broad buckler-fern (Dryopteris dilatata)
- Broad leaf dock (Rumex obtusifolius)
- Cherry laurel (Prunus laurocerasus)
- Cleavers (Galium aparine)
- Cuckoo pint (Arum maculatum)
- Common hop (Humulus lupulus)
- Common nettle (Urtica dioica)
- Common ragwort (Jacobaea vulgaris)
- Common oak (Quercus robur)
- Common pocket-moss (Fissidens taxifolius)
- Cow parsley (Anthriscus sylvestris)
- Crack willow (Salix × fragilis)
- Crescent-cup liverwort (Lunularia cruciata)
- Creeping buttercup (Ranunculus repens)
- Elder (Sambucus nigra)
- Enchanters nightshade (Circaea lutetiana)
- English oak (Quercus robur)
- Field maple (Acer campestre)
- Fool's parsley (Aethusa cynapium)
- Forget-me-nots (Myosotis sylvatica)
- Gean (Prunus avium)
- Great bindweed agg. (Calystegia sepium)
- Greater plantain (Plantago major)
- Guelder rose (Viburnum opulus)
- Hart's-tongue (Phyllitis scolopendrium)
- Hard fern (Blechnum spicant)
- Hawthorn (Crataegus monogyna)
- Hazel (Corylus avellana)
- Hedge bindweed (Calystegia sepium)
- Hedge woundwort (Stachys sylvatica)
- Henbane (Hyoscyamus niger)
- Herb bennet (Geum urbanum)
- Herb-robert (Geranium robertianum)
- Hogweed (Heracleum sphondylium)
- Holly (Ilex aquifolium)
- Honeysuckle (Lonicera periclymenum)
- Ivy (Hedera helix)
- Japanese knotweed (Reynoutria japonica)
- Knotgrass agg. (Polygonum aviculare)
- Lady fern (Athyrium filix-femina)
- Large leaved lime (Tilia platyphyllos)
- Lords and ladies (Arum maculatum)
- Lesser burdock (Arctium minus)
- Male fern (Dryopteris filix-mas)
- Native bluebells (Hyacinthoides non-scripta)
- New Zealand flax (Phormium 'Evening Glow')
- Moss (Mnium hornum)
- Nipplewort (Lapsana communis)
- Pendulous sedge (Carex pendula)
- Prickly sow-thistle (Sonchus asper)
- Pussy willow (Salix discolor)
- Red campion (Silene dioica)
- Rose (Rosa sp.)
- Rush (Juncus sp.)
- Sedge (Carex pendula)
- Sessile oak (Quercus petraea)
- Self heal (Prunella vulgaris)
- Smooth sow-thistle (Sonchus oleraceus)
- Snowberry (Symphoricarpos albus)
- Snowdrop (Leucojum aestivum)
- Soft shield-fern (Polystichum setiferum)
- Spindle (Euonymus europaeus)
- Sycamore tarspot (Rhytisma acerinum)
- Tutsan (Hypericum androsaemum)
- Water figwort (Scrophularia auriculata)
- Water starwort (Callitriche stagnalis s.l.)
- Wavy bitter-cress (Cardamine flexuosa)
- Weeping crack-willow (Salix × pendulina, a hybrid of Salix babylonica, with the male parent uncertain, likely either Salix × fragilis or S. euxina, but perhaps S. pentandra)
- Welsh poppy (Papaver cambricum)
- Wild angelica (Angelica sylvestris)
- Wilson's honeysuckle (Lonicera nitida)
- Willowherb (Epilobium)
- Wood anemone (Anemone nemorosa)
- Wood avens (Geum urbanum)
- Wood dock (Rumex)
- Wood forget-me-not (Myosotis sylvatica)

Fungi

- Artist fungus (Ganoderma applanatum)
- Angel wings (Pleurocybella)
- Beech bracket (Trametes gibbosa)
- Bracket, tinder polypore (Fomes fomentarius)
- Candle-snuff (Xylaria)
- Common ink cap (Coprinopsis atramentaria)
- Coral bracket, smoky polypore (Bjerkandera adusta)
- Coral spot fungus (Nectria cinnabarina)
- Cramp balls, Alfred cakes (Daldinia concentrica)
- Giant flame cap (Gymnopilus junonius)
- Jew's ear, jelly ear (Auricularia auricula-judae)
- Pleurocybella porrigens (Pleurocybella porrigens)
- Puff ball (Lycoperdon echinatum)
- Red cap (Amanita muscaria)
- Shaggy ink cap (Coprinus comatus)
- The wood ear mushroom (Auricularia auricula)
- Turkey tail (Trametes versicolor)
- Velvet shanks (Flammulina valutipes)
- Wood blewit (Lepista)
- Yellow brain fungus (Tremella mesenterica)

== Facilities ==
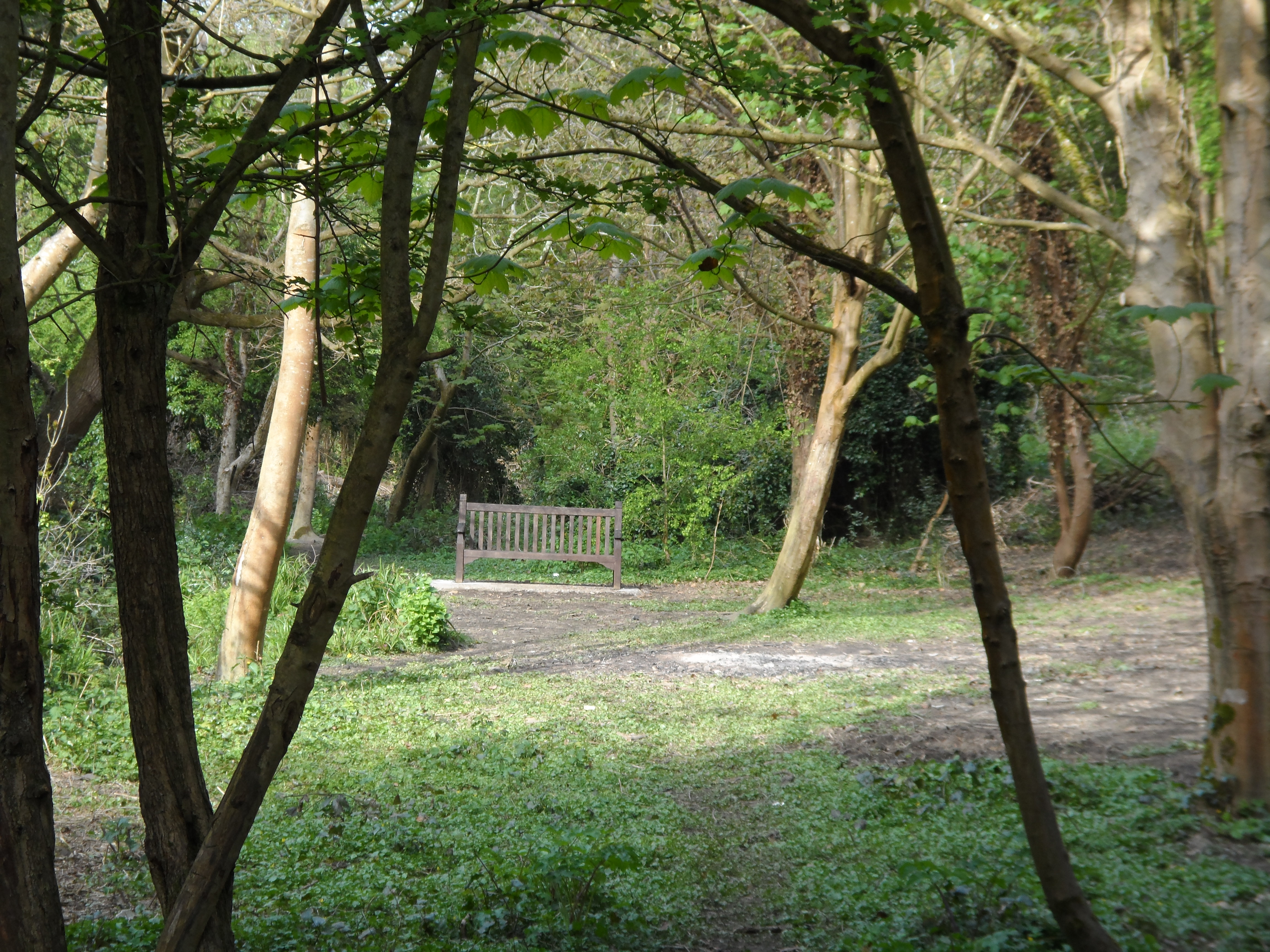
Places to relax

The local primary school children, Ore Church Mice and child minding groups in the woodland's vicinity use the woodland as a learning and recreational resource. In addition, local groups including Ore Trails give guided walks.

== Access ==
There is a map and numbered trail from the entrance at Ore Village Green. There is another entrance at Frederick Road and a further one from Victoria Avenue.

By public transport the Village Green Entrance on Old London Rd can be reached by bus from Hastings Railway Station alighting at the Frederick Road bus stop. Buses on route from Hastings Railway Station bus stop also pass near the entrance at Frederick Road.

The woodland can also be reached from Ore Station on foot.

== See also ==
- Hastings Country Park
- Fairlight
- Fairlight Glen
