= Fairlight, East Sussex =

Village in East Sussex, England

Coordinates: 50.88°N 0.65°E

Fairlight
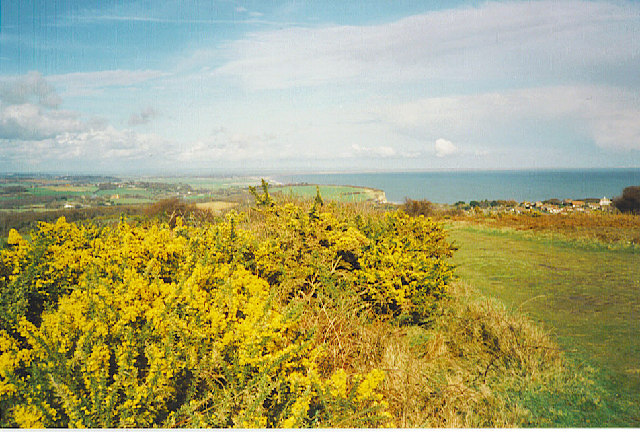
- The Fire Hills at Fairlight in 2000

- Location within East Sussex
- Area: 6.1 km^{2} (2.4 sq mi)
- Population: 1,670 (Parish-2011)
  - Density: 711/sq mi (275/km^{2})
- OS grid reference: TQ866121
  - London: 54 miles (87 km) NW
- District: Rother
- Shire county: East Sussex
- Region: South East
- Country: England
- Sovereign state: United Kingdom
- Post town: HASTINGS
- Postcode district: TN35
- Dialling code: 01424
- Police: Sussex
- Fire: East Sussex
- Ambulance: South East Coast
- UK Parliament: Hastings and Rye
- Website: http://www.fairlight.org.uk/

Fairlight is a village in East Sussex, England within Rother district, three miles (5 km) to the east of Hastings. Fairlight is also the name of the civil parish forming part of the Rother district which includes the villages of Fairlight and the much larger Fairlight Cove. The village of Fairlight lies on a minor road between Ore, Pett and Winchelsea.

St Andrew's Church (built 1845) has a tall tower and beacon turret, and can be seen for some distance around. The church is one of three in the United Benefice of Fairlight, Guestling and Pett. Richard D'Oyly Carte, founder of the Savoy Theatre, Savoy Hotel, and D'Oyly Carte Opera Company, which produced the Gilbert and Sullivan light operas, is buried in the churchyard. So also are Thomas Attwood Walmisley, and Sir James Roberts of Saltaire and his wife.

Fairlight Cove, the neighbouring settlement and part of the parish, has suffered from coastal erosion and landslips at Rockmead Road and Sea Road. A number of houses there are very close to the sea edge, and properties on those roads have suffered through demolition and abandonment of a number of properties. The Fairlight Preservation Trust, a registered charity, was set up with a view to combating the loss by erosion and more generally to enhance and protect the village. Sea defences were built in the 1990s at Sea Road and at Rockmead Road in 2007. The 2007 works are intended to be effective for 50 years from 2007, and are regularly monitored by Rother District Council and by the Trust.

Although the nearest railway station is Three Oaks, Hastings offers a much better service and can be reached by bus from Fairlight. Rye station is also accessible by bus from Fairlight.

The Cinema Museum in London holds extensive home movies filmed in and around Fairlight from the 1950s and 60s.

== Landmarks ==
Hastings Country Park stretches from Hastings to Cliff End, where it gives access to the beach. This is a favoured spot for fossil-hunters; the "Hastings Beds" are part of the Early Cretaceous Wealden Group, aged 140–136 million years. The park also gives access to the beach at Fairlight Glen.

The highest point in Hastings, now named North's Seat, is at the top of Fairlight Down in Hastings Country Park. It is named after Frederick North (MP) who represented the town. There used to be a windmill at this location, near which General William Roy erected a 32-foot temporary tower for vital cross-channel observations as part of the Anglo-French Survey (1784–1790), which used trigonometric measurements to link the Royal Greenwich Observatory in London with the Paris Observatory.

The country park is part of the larger Site of Special Scientific Interest called Hastings Cliffs to Pett Beach which extends into neighbouring parishes. The site is of both geological and biological interest.
