= All Souls Church, Hastings =

Former Anglican church in East Sussex, England

All Souls Church
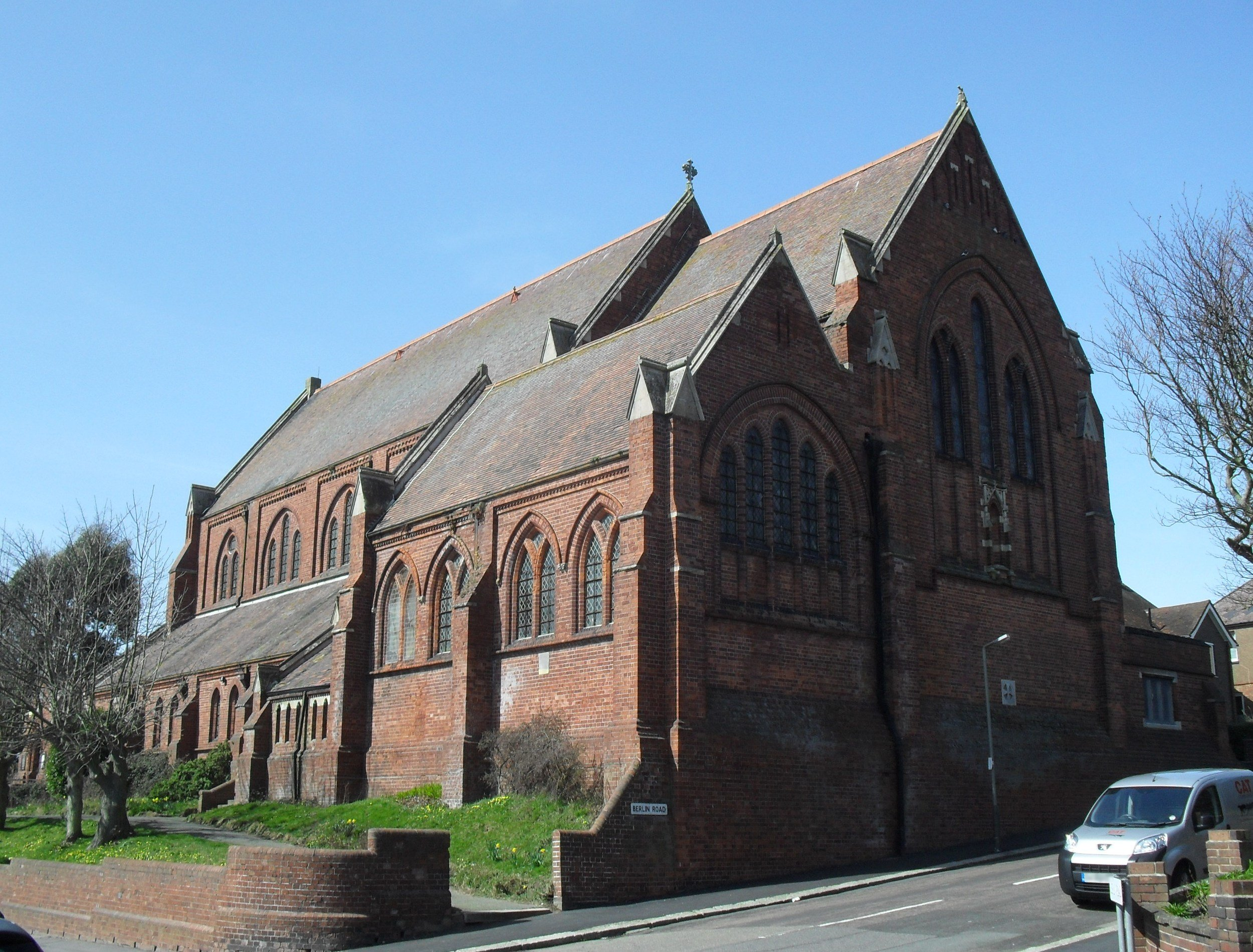
- The church from the east-southeast

- Location of the church within East Sussex
- 50.8673°N 0.6069°E
- Location: Athelstan Road, Clive Vale, Hastings, East Sussex TN35 5JE
- Country: England
- Denomination: Anglican

History
- Status: Church
- Founded: 2 November 1889
- Founder: Elizabeth Mason
- Dedication: All Souls

Architecture
- Functional status: Redundant
- Heritage designation: Grade II*
- Designated: 14 September 1976
- Architect: Arthur Blomfield
- Style: Early English Gothic Revival
- Groundbreaking: 1890
- Completed: 1891
- Closed: 4 November 2007

Administration
- Province: Canterbury
- Diocese: Chichester
- Archdeaconry: Lewes and Hastings
- Deanery: Rural Deanery of Hastings
- Parish: Ore: Christ Church

All Souls Church is a former Anglican church that served the Clive Vale suburb of Hastings, a seaside resort town and borough in the English county of East Sussex, between 1890 and 2007. The "large [and] serious town church" has been described as one of the best works by prolific ecclesiastical architect Arthur Blomfield. Built almost wholly of brick, inside and out, it dominates the streetscape of the late Victorian suburb and has a tall, "dramatic" interior displaying many of Blomfield's favourite architectural features. The church also has Heaton, Butler and Bayne stained glass and an elaborate reredos. Falling attendances and high maintenance costs caused it to close after a final service in November 2007, and the Diocese of Chichester officially declared it redundant soon afterwards. English Heritage has listed it at Grade II* for its architectural and historical importance; despite this, it was announced in 2025 that demolition was being considered.

== History ==
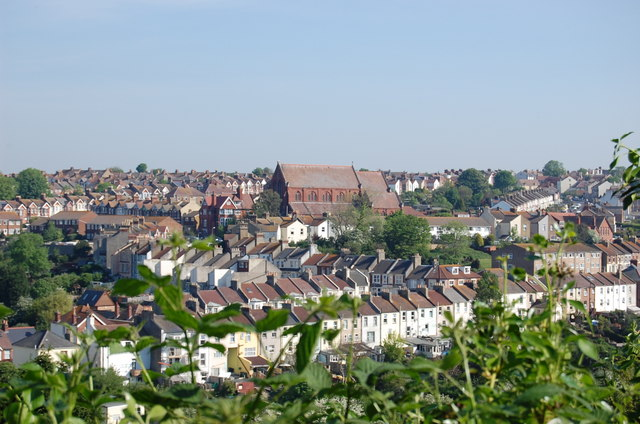
The church, seen here from the south, is prominent in the townscape of Hastings.

Clive Vale developed as a suburb of Hastings in the 1870s and 1880s after the British Land Company acquired most of the land between Ore village, the English Channel coast and an 1830s villa called Minnis Rock at High Wickham, east of Hastings Old Town. This was a period of rapid growth for the town: the population rose from 29,000 to 42,000 in the ten years from 1871.

Many new Anglican churches were built in the Victorian era to supplement the ancient parish churches of All Saints and St Clement's in the Old Town and to serve the new neighbouring resort town of St Leonards-on-Sea (part of the Borough of Hastings since 1875). Between 1828 and 1885, 18 were completed: St Mary-in-the-Castle (1828), St Leonard's (1831–32), St Clement's at Halton (1838), Holy Trinity (1851–59), St Mary Magdalene's (1852), St Nicholas' (1854), Christ Church at Ore village (1858), St Peter's at Baldslow (1863), St John's at Hollington (1865–68), St Paul's (1868), St Andrew's (1869), St Helen's (1869), Emmanuel (1873–74), Christ Church at St Leonards-on-Sea (1875), Christ Church at Blacklands (1878–81), St John the Evangelist's (1881), St Matthew's (1884) and St Peter's at Bohemia (1885). Despite this lavish provision, there were no Anglican churches close to Clive Vale; the only place of worship in the suburb was a Congregational chapel opened in 1887, although a parish room with the dedication All Souls was erected on Athelstan Road in 1884.

A resident of St Leonards-on-Sea, Elizabeth Mason, provided money for a church to be built in memory of her late husband, and a site was found at the junction of Athelstan and Berlin Roads. Arthur Blomfield, "one of the most active and successful church architects of the Gothic Revival", was commissioned to design it. The foundation stone was placed on All Souls' Day (2 November) 1889, construction work began in 1890, and the church was opened on 16 July 1891 after a consecration ceremony. An elaborate mosaic reredos was added in 1897 below the east window at a cost of £1,000 (£112,000 in 2025)).

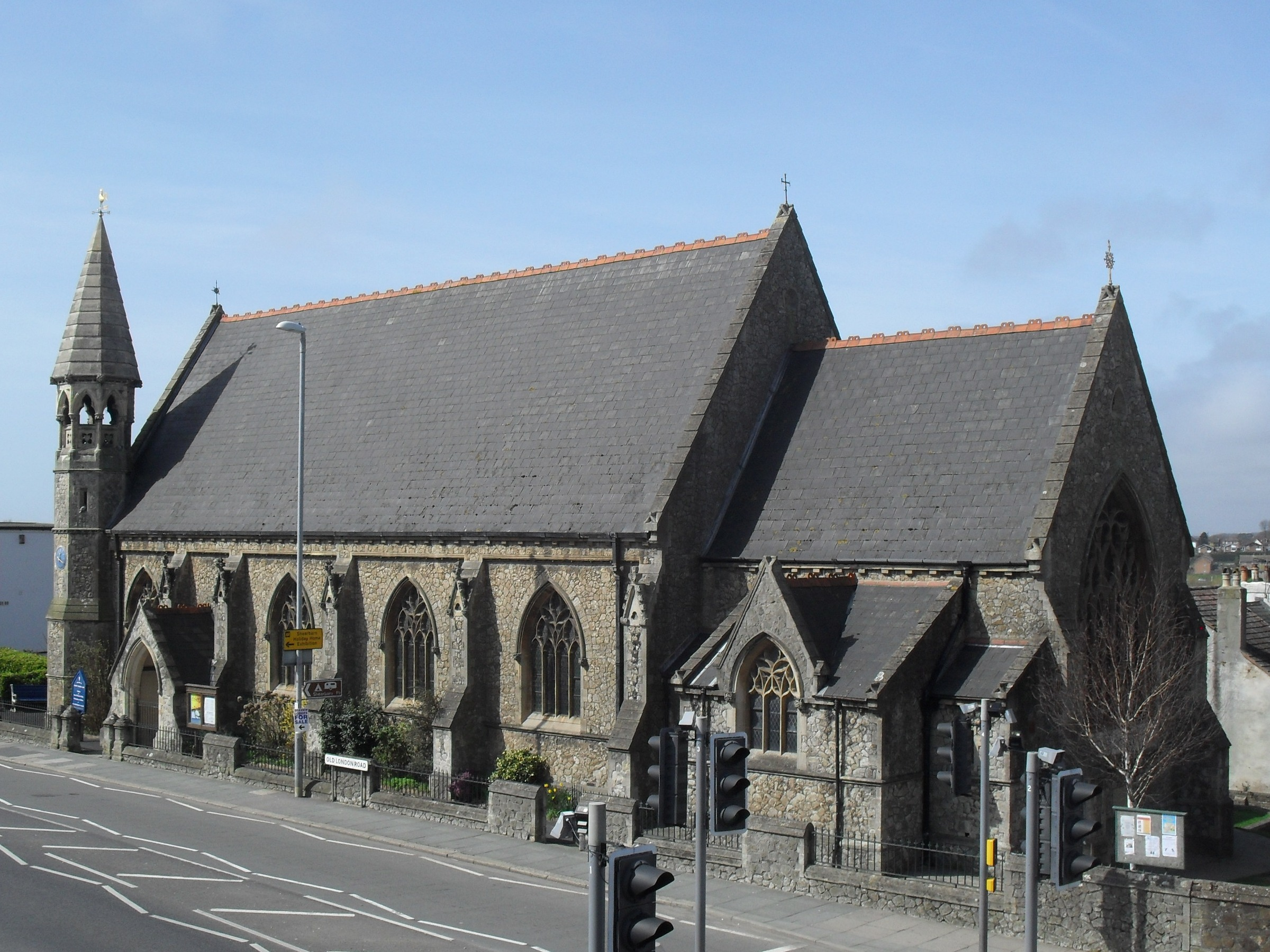
The parish was joined to that of Christ Church, Ore after closure.

By the late 20th century, population shifts and declining church attendance meant the provision of Anglican churches in Hastings was excessive. Four were demolished between 1964 and 1986, and others were closed. The first indication that All Souls Church may close came in August 2002, when structural problems were discovered, forcing the entrance on Berlin Road to be shut. Repairs were estimated at £200,000—too much for the 25-strong congregation to raise. Furthermore, the church was already supported by large grants to keep it going. It remained open for a few more years, but the final service was held on 4 November 2007 and a temporary closure notice was served. It was formally declared redundant by the Diocese of Chichester on 1 March 2008. The church was put up for sale in January 2012, and remained on sale as of 2025 with a local agency at a price of £250,000. Despite its listed status, and the fact that a former member of the congregation continued to watch over the church, damage to the roof and internal fixtures was, by 2025, considered so substantial and expensive to repair that the Church Commissioners announced they were considering demolition.

All Souls Church was listed at Grade C by English Heritage on 14 September 1976. Grade C was part of an old superseded scale of ratings used only for Anglican churches; it was equivalent to the present Grade II, which signifies a "nationally important" building of "special interest". The church was later reassessed and upgraded to Grade II*, the second highest status; such buildings are considered "particularly important ... [and] of more than special interest". As of February 2021, it was one of 13 Grade II* listed buildings, and 535 listed buildings of all grades, in the borough of Hastings. As of 2014, the church is for sale on a freehold or leasehold basis. In October 2014, The Victorian Society stated the church was one of "the top ten most endangered Victorian and Edwardian buildings in England and Wales" and that there was a risk of the church being demolished.

The advowson (the right to appoint clergy) was held by the rector of St John the Evangelist's Church, St Leonards-on-Sea. The parish was created in 1889 from a section of All Saints Church's parish. After the church closed, the parish was merged with that of Christ Church, Ore, and a united benefice was formed.

== Architecture ==
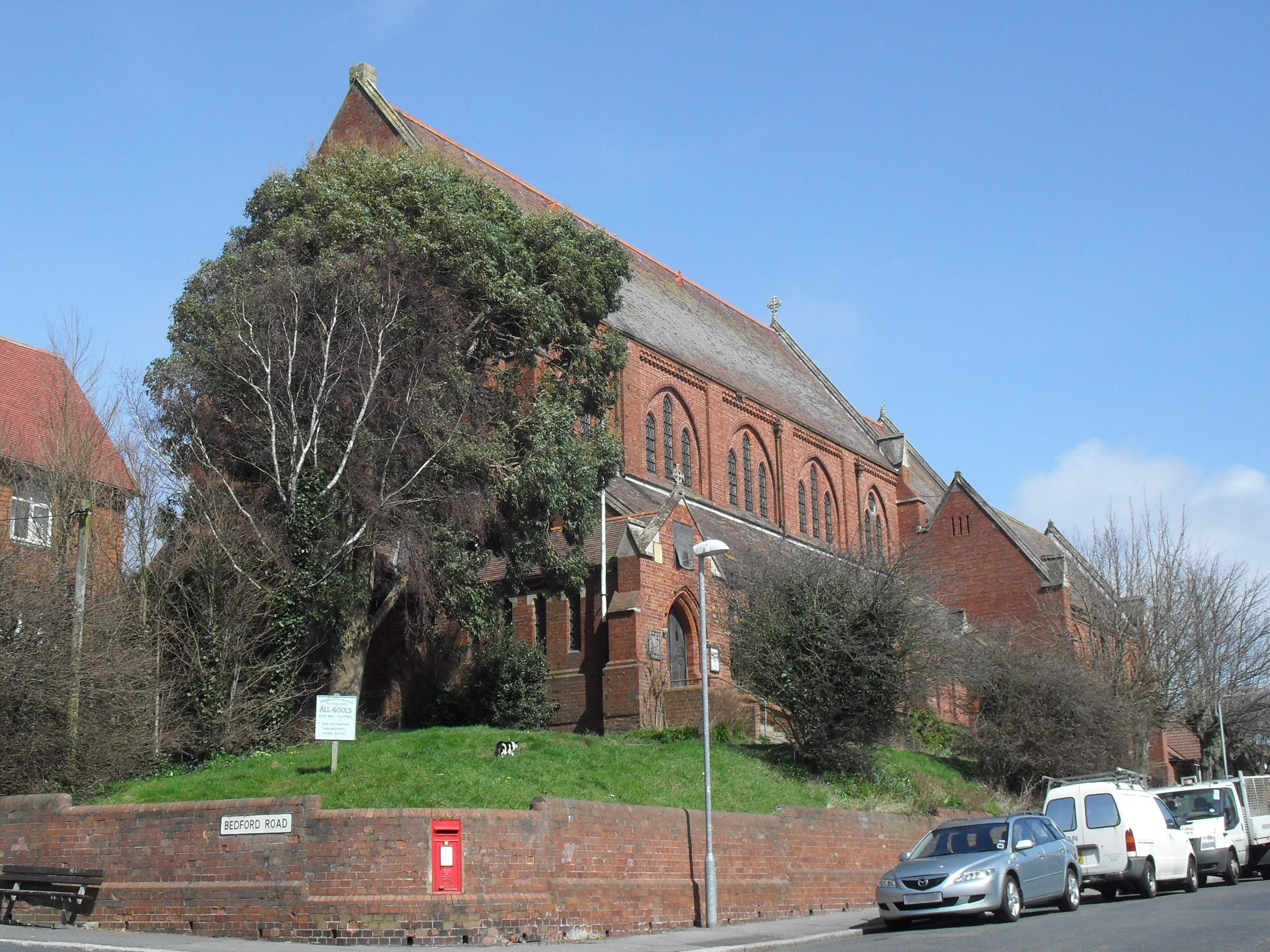
The five-bay nave has a clerestory above.

Arthur Blomfield was a prolific Gothic Revival architect who worked on many church commissions in Sussex and elsewhere. Some were restorations, but he built many new churches: examples are Christ Church and St John the Evangelist's Church in St Leonards-on-Sea, St Andrew's Church, Worthing, All Saints Church, Roffey, St Luke's Church, Queen's Park, Brighton and St Leodegar's Church, Hunston. English Heritage stated that while some of his churches "have a routine quality ... All Souls is one of his best works". It notes that his use of the sloping site, a "vigorous" Early English Gothic Revival style, a distinctive plan, unusual window layouts and red brick throughout made it a "boldly massed town church [with a] dramatic grouping". Nikolaus Pevsner described it as a "serious town church", and a Sussex church historian called it "the finest red-brick interior" in the county.

All Souls Church is a large building of red brick, inside and out. There is a five-bay nave with aisles on the north and south sides and a clerestory, a chancel with two vestries, a Lady chapel and an organ chamber, a baptistery and entrance porches on two sides. There is no tower, spire or bell-turret. The style is Early English Gothic Revival. The only use of stone is on some of the exterior dressings and the corbels and capitals of the arcade piers. The brickwork is laid in the Flemish bond pattern, and the roof is of clay tiles.

The church is tall: there is little distinction between the height of the nave and the chancel, and the chancel arch between them is modest. It is entirely of moulded brick with responds on the walls. The aisles are of five bays, each with paired lancet windows, are "lean-to" in style; they project below the clerestory with paired lancets and an oculus to the first and fifth bays and three stepped lancet windows to the other bays. The east window has five lights in a distinctive layout, all set in an arched recess: the middle window is a tall lancet, and the flanking pairs have y-tracery. Similar tracery also appears in windows in the Lady chapel and the west wall. Some of the clerestory windows have plate tracery. The north side has an organ chamber in the form of a transept, lit by narrow windows and an oculus. One bell is held in a gabled wooden chamber. At the west end is a baptistery in a canted apse.

The interior is "spacious" and has a high-quality roof of open timberwork; Blomfield's churches have characteristically good woodwork. Fittings include Heaton, Butler and Bayne stained glass windows, an "impressively ornate" wrought-iron rood screen and an intricate reredos with marble mosaic work. The pulpit is of stone and wrought iron. The font is entirely of marble, and the sedilia also has marble work. Encaustic tiles cover the chancel floor. An essentially unaltered Norman and Beard organ is housed in the organ chamber.

A war memorial commemorating the names of some 40 men of the parish who served during the First World War is beneath a St George and the Dragon carving on the east wall.

== See also ==
- List of places of worship in Hastings

== Sources ==
- Elleray, D. Robert (1981). The Victorian Churches of Sussex. Chichester: Phillimore & Co. Ltd. ISBN 0-85033-378-4.
- Elleray, D. Robert (2004). Sussex Places of Worship. Worthing: Optimus Books. ISBN 0-9533132-7-1.
- Marchant, Rex (1997). Hastings Past. Chichester: Phillimore & Co. ISBN 1-86077-046-0.
- Nairn, Ian; Pevsner, Nikolaus (1965). The Buildings of England: Sussex. Harmondsworth: Penguin Books. ISBN 0-14-071028-0.
- Salzman, L.F., ed. (1973) [1937]. A History of Sussex. The Victoria Histories of the Counties of England. Vol. 9. Folkestone: Dawsons of Pall Mall (originally Oxford: Oxford University Press). ISBN 0-7129-0590-1.
