= University of Brighton Academies Trust =

British Academy Trust

The University of Brighton Academies Trust is a multi-academy trust sponsored by the University of Brighton. The trust runs 15 academy schools in Crawley, Mid Sussex, Shoreham-by-Sea, Hastings and St Leonards-on-Sea.

12 are primary schools. The secondary schools are Hastings Academy, The Burgess Hill Academy and The St Leonards Academy.

Blackthorns Community Primary Academy was named as one of the top 20 primary schools in England in Key Stage 2 in reading, writing and maths in April 2018.

In June 2018 the trust secured £298,650 from the National College for Teaching and Leadership, for a project for the youngest disadvantaged children in Hastings primary schools.

The trust has a policy of issuing toilet passes to avoid the abuse of toilet breaks during lesson time. In September 2018 an 11-year-old girl, who was experiencing her first menstrual bleed was not allowed to use the toilet and sent home with bloody knickers, tights and shorts from Hastings Academy. The school wanted a doctor's certificate, at a cost of £15, before they would issue a toilet pass.

In October 2022 it was agreed to create a bulge class at the Burgess Hill Academy to make room for an extra 30 students.
