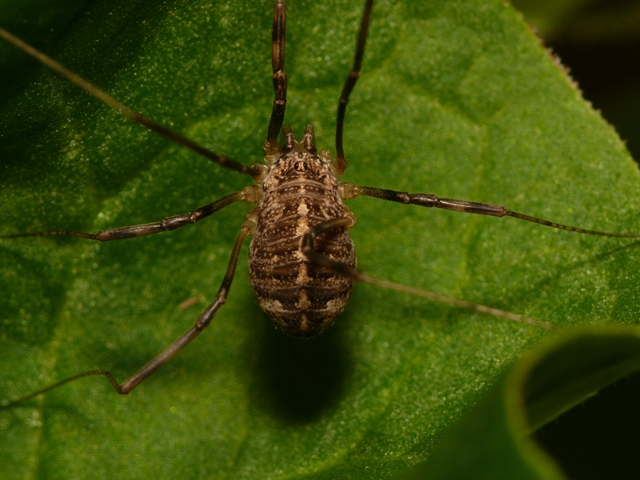

Scientific classification
- Kingdom: Animalia
- Phylum: Arthropoda
- Subphylum: Chelicerata
- Class: Arachnida
- Order: Opiliones
- Family: Phalangiidae
- Genus: Opilio
- Species: O. saxatilis

Binomial name
- Opilio saxatilis (Koch, 1839)

= Opilio saxatilis =

Species of harvestman/daddy longlegs

Opilio saxatilis is a species of harvestman.

== Life cycle ==
Eggs are laid in autumn and hatch in spring. In Britain, active adults have been documented between July to December. O.saxatilis has been recorded to prey on Diptera and aphids.

== Morphology ==
While similar to Opilio parietinus, as much to have been considered a synonym of this species in the past, there are several differences between the two species. The average body length is 5 mm for females and 4.5 mm for males, significantly smaller than the 7.5–8 mm of Opilio parietinus, but with shorter legs. The abdomen and cephalotorax of O.saxatilis also feature a typical middle light-coloured line, sometimes presenting as a row of pale dots. The ocularium features 2-4 tubercles, compared with the 4-8 of O.parietinus.

== Distribution and habitat ==
The species is likely to be of eastern Mediterranean origin, but it is now reported all over Europe; the eastern distribution goes at least as far as Poland and in the south it is recorded in Italy and Greece. O. saxatilis prefers dry soils, and open, unshaded habitats, generally drier than those typical of other harvestmen. They include heathland, grassland, gardens and open woodland; it can be found on the under surface of logs and other wood or stones, and it has been documented to be relatively abundant at the base of marram grass on sand dunes. O.saxatilis also inhabits human dwellings, and can be found in construction sites, parks, gardens and buildings or walls.
