= Christ Church, Ore =

Christ Church
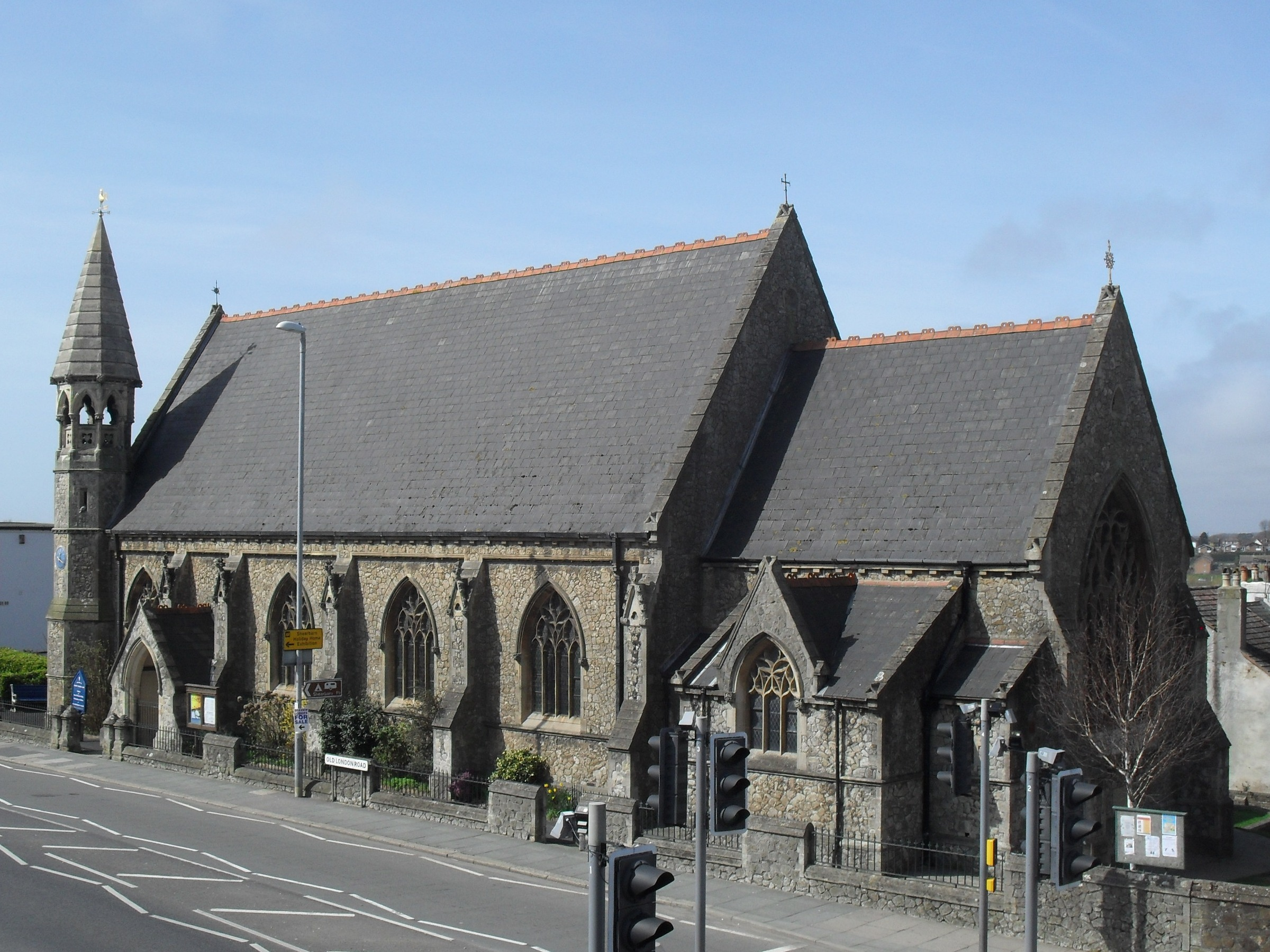
- The church from the east
- Christ Church
- 50.8722°N 0.6082°E
- OS grid reference: TQ 83612 11315
- Location: Old London Road, Ore, Hastings, East Sussex
- Country: England
- Denomination: Church of England
- Churchmanship: Open Evangelical
- Website: http://www.christchurch-ore.org.uk

History
- Status: Parish church
- Founded: 23 November 1858
- Founder: Rev. W. T. Turner
- Dedication: Christ Church
- Dedicated: 1858

Architecture
- Functional status: Active
- Heritage designation: Grade II
- Designated: 14 September 1976
- Architect: Alexander Dick Gough
- Style: Decorated Gothic
- Completed: 1859
- Construction cost: £4,268 (£458,500 in 2025)

Administration
- Province: Canterbury
- Diocese: Chichester
- Archdeaconry: Lewes and Hastings
- Deanery: Rural Deanery of Hastings
- Parish: Ore: Christ Church

Christ Church is an Anglican church in the Ore area of the town and borough of Hastings, one of six local government districts in the English county of East Sussex. It is one of three Anglican churches with this dedication in the borough. The Decorated Gothic-style church, in the centre of a village which has been surrounded by suburban development, was built in 1858 to supplement Ore's parish church, St Helen's. The most distinctive structural feature, a corner bell turret, has been described as both "outstanding" and "very naughty" by architectural historians. English Heritage has listed the building at Grade II for its architectural and historical importance.

== History ==
The ancient Cinque Port and fishing town of Hastings evolved into a seaside resort in the 19th century. The arrival of two separate railway routes from London (one via Lewes, the other via Tunbridge Wells) and improved road links helped this; the population doubled from about 11,000 a few years before these developments to 23,000 20 years later. The town, previously focused around the seafront area, grew inland, and Ore—a small linear village on the road to Rye—was gradually absorbed into the urban area. It was first recorded in the early 12th century, although its Anglo-Saxon name (derived from ora, meaning a ridge or slope) suggests earlier settlement, and a parish church was built on high ground to the northwest, near Ore manor house, in the 12th century. There were a few cottages around it until the mid-19th century, but by that time the focus of Ore's development had moved decisively to the area around the main road and Fairlight Down (assisted by the construction of a barracks at Halton and the conversion of the road to turnpike status).

As well as being distant from the growing village, St Helen's Church was small and in a ruinous condition. A replacement church was planned (and eventually built in 1869); but before that the rector of the church, Rev. W.T. Turner, decided to found a new church closer to the centre of population. Ore had become a poor, working-class area affected by unemployment and poverty (the workhouse was twice replaced with a larger building), and he wanted to provide greater spiritual support to the growing population.

Architect and engineer Alexander Dick Gough was commissioned for the work. Closely associated until 1848 with Robert Lewis Roumieu, who was known for curious and distinctive Gothic designs, Gough's ecclesiastical work often showed unusual touches and was sometimes criticised in the influential journal The Ecclesiologist. Most of his churches were in London; Christ Church was his only commission in Sussex. He submitted his design in 1858, and the church was built over the course of the next year at a cost of £4,268 (equivalent to £458,500 in 2025). The foundation stone was placed by local philanthropist and church benefactor Countess Waldegrave on 23 November 1858. At first, the church was an unparished chapel of ease.

The church roof originally had vents to allow fumes from its gas lighting to escape, but these have been removed. Early in the 20th century, a carved timber reredos was added inside. A World War I memorial was erected next to the entrance porch soon after the war ended, and the original north transept was later converted into a vestry to form a memorial to victims of World War II. The church had been damaged by wartime bombing in February 1943, although it was soon repaired. The distinctive corner turret was comprehensively restored in 2003: work was carried out on its clock, bell, spire and the weathervane.

== Architecture ==
Christ Church is an "intact and distinctive Gothic Revival church". Its style is Decorated Gothic, and sandstone rubble and Kentish ragstone are the principal building materials. The roof is tiled with slate. The most distinctive feature of the exterior is the thin octagonal turret, bearing a clockface, containing a bell and topped with a spire and weathervane. Nikolaus Pevsner described this Victorian flourish as "very naughty". The plan consists of a chancel, nave of five bays and with an aisle on the north side (on a brick base), organ chamber, two vestries (one originally a transept) and two porches with gables. The exterior has buttresses all the way round, some with steeply gabled upper sections. The church is oriented north–south, at right-angles to liturgical directions.

The windows, all lancets, have intricate tracery. The (liturgical) west window is large, with seven lights, and the east window is similar. Stained glass was added to two nave windows by the Heaton, Butler and Bayne firm in 1930. The interior is noteworthy for its intricate naturalistic foliage carvings, especially on the capitals in the nave, on the corbels and on the chancel arch. Above both the chancel arch and the (liturgical) east window are painted decorative friezes; the latter was renewed in the early 1990s. Other internal fittings include three sedilia, a wooden pulpit, a simple octagonal font and a wooden reredos with tablets showing the Ten Commandments, Lord's Prayer and the Nicene Creed.

== The church today ==
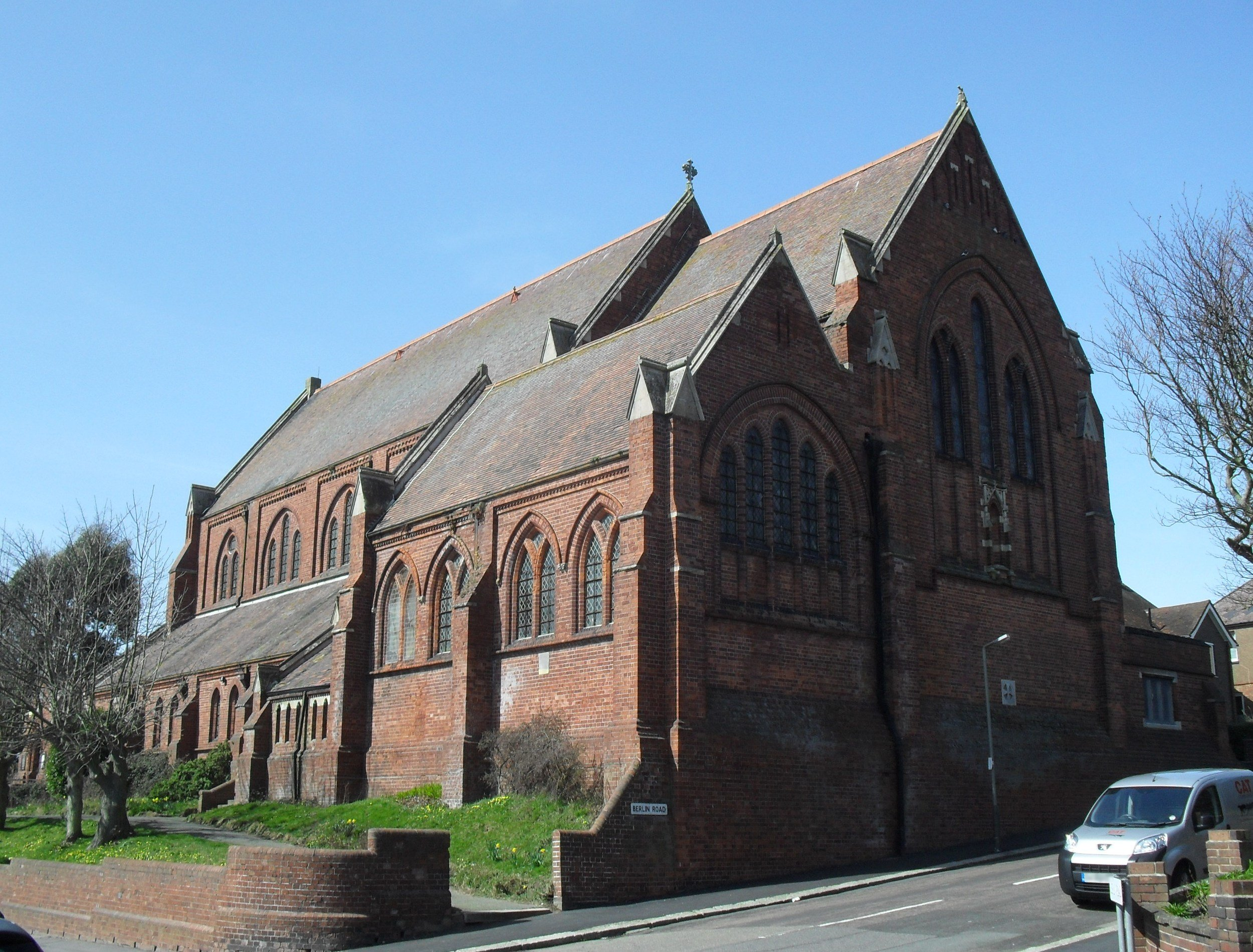
All Souls Church (closed 2007) is now in the parish.

Christ Church was listed at Grade II by English Heritage on 14 September 1976; this defines it as a "nationally important" building of "special interest". In February 2001, it was one of 521 Grade II listed buildings, and 535 listed buildings of all grades, in the borough of Hastings.

The church is one of three active Anglican churches in the borough of Hastings with the dedication "Christ Church", and the earliest. The others are at Laton Road in the suburb of Blacklands (1878–81) and on London Road in St Leonards-on-Sea (1875).

The parish of Christ Church covers the suburb of Ore east of the railway line, north and east to the borough boundary, and south to Frederick, Mount and Edwin Roads. It has merged with the former parish of All Souls Church at Athelstan Road, Clive Vale, which closed in 2007.

On Sundays, there is one service at 10.30am (using Common Worship, and including a Kids group). Daily prayer services on weekday mornings are supplemented by a Book of Common Prayer Eucharistic service on Wednesday mornings.

== See also ==
- List of places of worship in Hastings

== Bibliography ==
- Body, Geoffrey (1984). Railways of the Southern Region. PSL Field Guides. Cambridge: Patrick Stephens Ltd. ISBN 0-85059-664-5.
- Brooks, Ken (2004). Around Hastings Then and Now. St Leonards-on-Sea: Ken Brooks. ISBN 0-9540513-2-7.
- Elleray, D. Robert (1979). Hastings: a Pictorial History. Chichester: Phillimore & Co. ISBN 0-85033-324-5.
- Elleray, D. Robert (2004). Sussex Places of Worship. Worthing: Optimus Books. ISBN 0-9533132-7-1.
- Nairn, Ian; Pevsner, Nikolaus (1965). The Buildings of England: Sussex. Harmondsworth: Penguin Books. ISBN 0-14-071028-0.
- Salzman, L.F., ed. (1973) [1937]. A History of Sussex. The Victoria Histories of the Counties of England. Vol. 9. Folkestone: Dawsons of Pall Mall (originally Oxford: Oxford University Press). ISBN 0-7129-0590-1.
