= Fairlight Glen =

Beach in East Sussex, England

Coordinates: 50.870°N 0.645°E

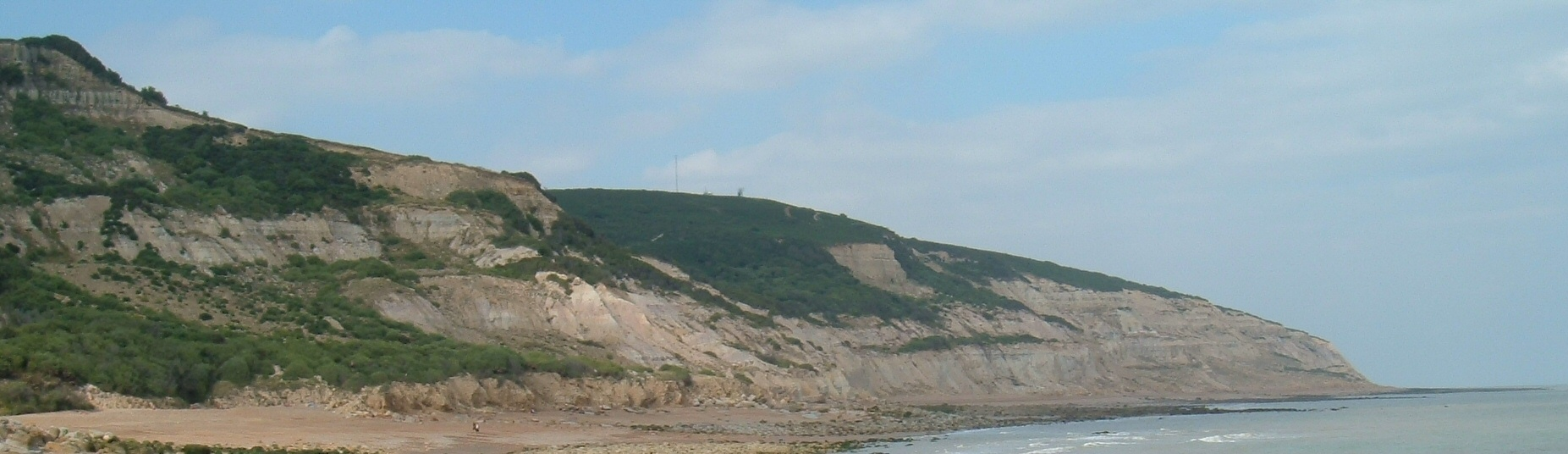
Covehurst Bay

Fairlight Glen lies about 2 miles (3.2 km) east of the fishing port of Hastings and 1.5 miles (2.4 km) west of the small village of Fairlight Cove on the East Sussex coast. It is a wooded area forming part of the Hastings Country Park Nature Reserve and leading down to Covehurst Bay. This is a naturist beach, but is shared by non-naturist visitors. The name Covehurst Bay is not normally used for the beach, but is marked on OS maps.

The beach is mainly shingle with large boulders and some patches of sand, particularly at low tide. The main cove lies between lower cliff areas formed in major cliff collapses some time in the past. There are no facilities or buildings of any kind on the beach, nor in the country park on the cliffs above. The harbour arm of Hastings is just visible at low tide, as is the nuclear power station at Dungeness a few miles further east.

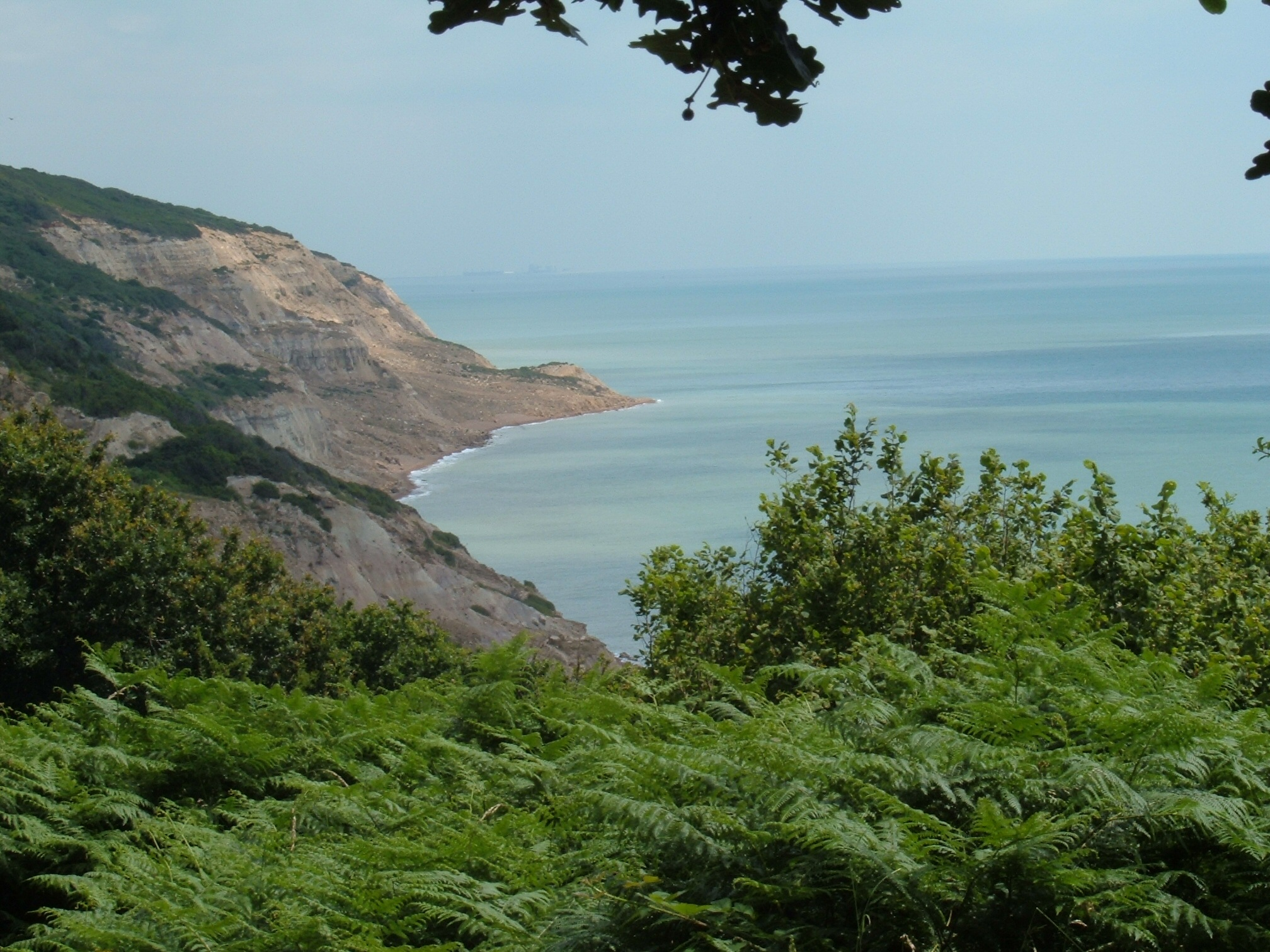
View from Cliffs

The beach can be reached by walking from Hastings along the hilly clifftop coast path until a signpost points out a pathway leading down the cliff to the cove. There is currently a detour around Ecclesbourne Glen due to a landslip

The beach can also be reached from Firehills, a coastguard station and viewpoint, with parking for visitors to the park. From here it is a steep 20 minute walk downhill west along the coast path.

It is normally possible to walk along the beach to Hastings, but this may be cut off at high tide; the journey is an arduous one, involving extensive walking on loose pebbles and the debris from cliff falls. It also possible, at low tide only, to walk east along the beach to Fairlight Cove and Petts Level. Both these routes may be blocked by cliff falls which happen regularly on this coast.

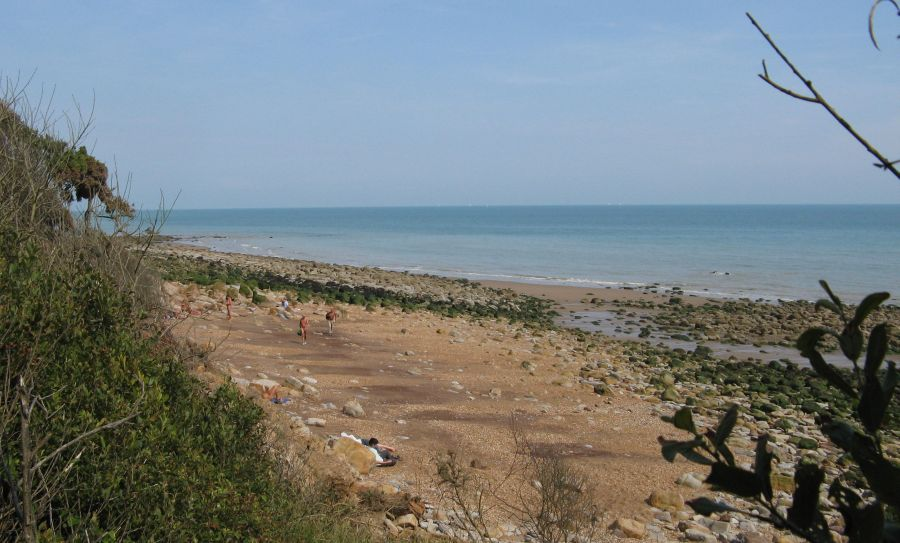
View from beach level

The 100 ft (30 m) high cliffs are sandstone and clay which is subject to erosion. Access to the beach was officially closed when the original wooden steps leading down from the coast path were swept away in a landslip. Alternative steps have been cut into the path by users; as of June 2021 the path was safe to walk, but the visitor should be prepared for a bit of a climb Anyone contemplating swimming should be aware of hidden rocks and the absence of lifeguards or normal rescue services. Occasionally people have been rescued by helicopter from the beach or cliffs.

== See also ==
- Hastings Country Park
- Fairlight, East Sussex
- Speckled Wood, Hastings
