= The Burgess Hill Academy =

Location
- Station Road; Burgess Hill, West Sussex, RH15 9EA; England; 50°57′07″N 0°08′00″W

Information
- Former name: Oakmeeds
- Type: Academy
- Established: 1958
- Local authority: West Sussex
- Trust: Sussex Learning Trust
- Department for Education URN: 142089 Tables
- Ofsted: Reports
- Acting Principal: P. Snelling
- Gender: Co-educational
- Age: 11 to 16
- Enrolment: 956 (2026)
- Website: www.theburgesshillacademy.org.uk

The Burgess Hill Academy (formerly Oakmeeds Community College) is a co-educational secondary school located in central Burgess Hill, West Sussex, England. It is the oldest secondary school located in Burgess Hill, located within the town centre.

== History ==
Oakmeeds was created as a County Secondary School in 1958 and became a comprehensive school in 1971.

Oakmeeds took its name from the oak trees in the school grounds, running along the path of a Roman road, and from Meeds Pottery, which stood there before Oakmeeds was built. It mainly serves Burgess Hill; but also has students from nearby villages, including Hassocks and Hurstpierpoint, as well as the City of Brighton and Hove area, and Haywards Heath, to the north.

Oakmeeds celebrated its semicentennial in 2005. Previously a community school administered by West Sussex County Council, in September 2016 Oakmeeds Community College converted to academy status and renamed The Burgess Hill Academy. The school is was sponsored by the University of Brighton Academies Trust until 2026, when it changed to the Sussex Learning Trust after the Trust had money problems. In 2026, there were 956 students attending the academy, currently rated 'Good' by Ofsted.

== Teaching ==
The academy boasts a wide range of curriculum subjects on offer, and has a wealth of facilities available for students to utilise. This includes a fully equipped drama studio, sports hall, All Weather sports ground and gym area. It will also have a Dance Studio but this is still under construction.

There is also a dedicated special educational needs facility on site - known as The Haven, providing extra support for SEND students.

== Notable former pupils ==
- Will Wood, footballer
