= Hastings Academy =

Mulberry Academy Hastings

Location
- Rye Road; Ore, Hastings, East Sussex, TN35 5DN; England
- Coordinates: 50°52′47″N 0°36′55″E

Information
- Type: Academy
- Motto: Pride Through Success
- Established: 1952
- Local authority: East Sussex
- Department for Education URN: 136401 Tables
- Ofsted: Reports
- Principal: Simon Addison
- Gender: Coeducational
- Age: 11 to 16
- Enrolment: 879 (2024)
- Website: http://www.thehastingsacademy.org.uk/

The Mulberry Academy Hastings, formerly known as The Hastings Academy, is a secondary school in Hastings, East Sussex, England. The Hastings Academy opened on 1 September 2011 moving into a new building during February 2013. The school has around 900 students and over 100 staff. It is run by the University of Brighton Academies Trust.

== History ==
Hastings A School was completed in 1953, where it opened as a girls secondary school. At around this time the school campus was made up of B-Block and the sports fields.

With the merger of the boys secondary school located in Priory Road with Hastings Grammar School in 1978, (next to Castledown School), Hillcrest accepted both male and female students. Arthur Trevor Kimber who had been head at Hastings Secondary School for Boys became the new head teacher of Hillcrest and many of his staff team from the boys' school transferred across with him.

In 2007 the school closed its 6th Form. September 2013 saw the closing of Hillcrest School and the opening of The Hastings Academy.

== The Old Hillcrest Campus ==
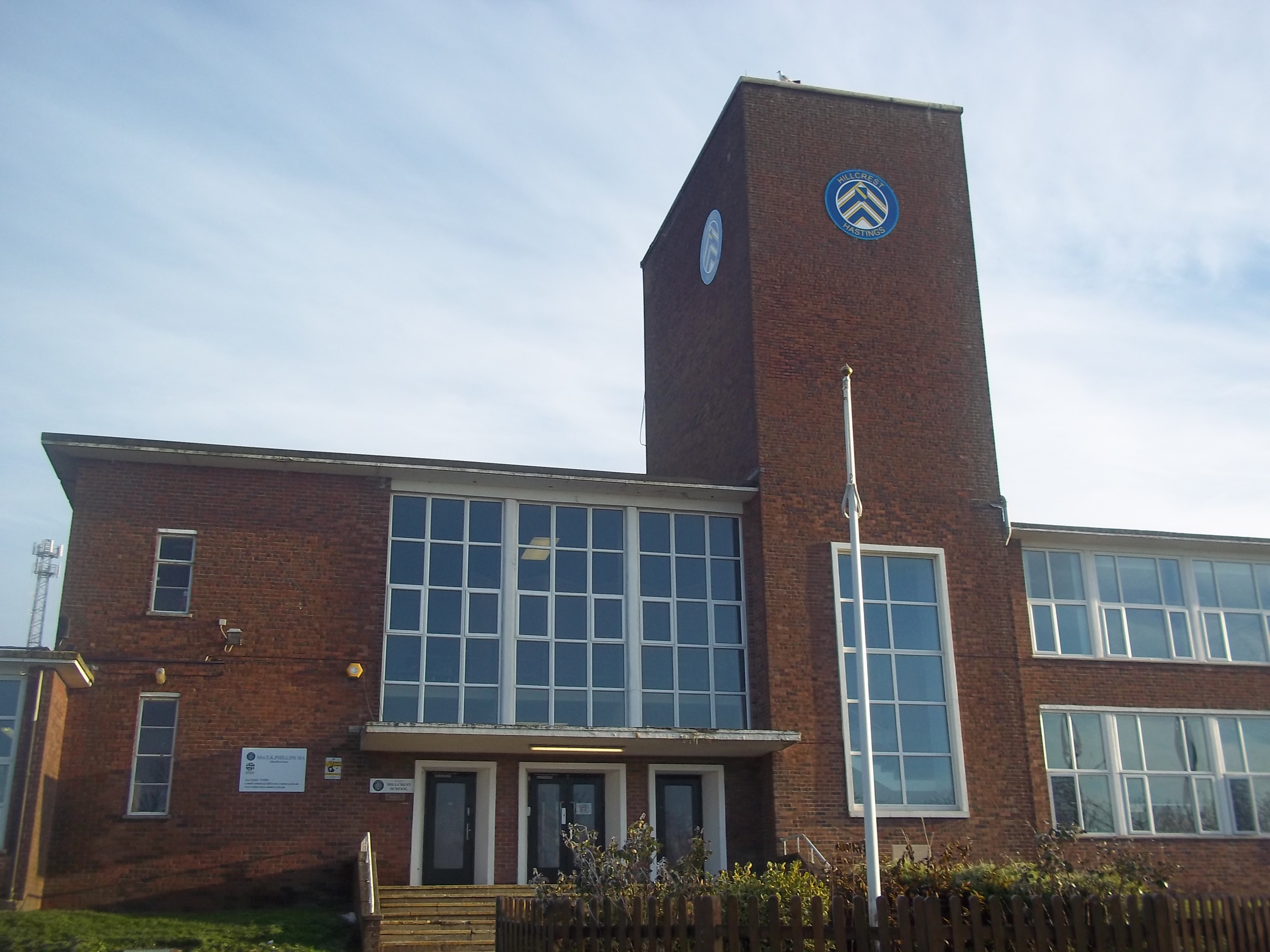
Former school buildings

The school campus was divided into four blocks: L block, the Sports Centre, A Block and B Block. In addition to the Sports Centre, there is a gymnasium in B Block. There were three tennis courts on site and four playgrounds. There were two fields east of the Language Block. The school owned part of the woodland behind A Block's playground. A multi use games area was opened in 2006.

=== A Block ===
- Humanities: Geography, History and religious education
- Science
- Drama
- Administration
- Caretakers' office

There were huts behind A Block where maths was taught and student services, the health clinic, library and canteen were located there.

=== B Block ===
- English and media
- Maths
- Art
- IT
- PE (gym)
- Music
- Design technology
- Student Services
- SENCO Department (also, Remedial Block, also J Block)
- Food Technology

The main entrance was there and led to Kenway Hall.

=== C Block (also, L Block) ===
The language college was where French, German and Spanish was taught to the students; Japanese language. Other languages were taught during after school classes. There was an ICT suite, primarily for the use by Language classes.

== Hastings Federation ==
In 2008, a proposal to create a federation between Filsham Valley, Hillcrest and The Grove secondary schools to improve major aspects of the school was approved by East Sussex County Council.

Under the federation, led by Sir Dexter Hutt, the school has improved in all areas including attitude towards learning, behaviour both in and out of the classroom, OFSTED inspections and GCSE results with 76% of students achieving 5 A* – C, and at least 93% 5A* – G grades.

The federation continues today in the form of the University of Brighton Academies Trust which includes Hastings Academy and The St Leonards Academy (the result of a merger between Filsham Valley and The Grove).

The Mulberry Academy Hastings opened on 1 September 2011 and an extensive building programme saw the old buildings occupied during the development and construction of the new buildings. The old school was demolished and the current buildings have been used since February 2013.

== Current Day ==
The academy boasts a wide range of facilities for their students, including a sports hall, floodlit 3G pitch, dance studio and grass pitch. At the beginning of the 2024/25 academic year, they added two new vocational courses to their curriculum - hair and beauty and mechanics - further widening the curriculum on offer.

They also have a specialist special educational needs centre, meeting students individual needs and ensuring all have access to the curriculum whilst at the academy. With a further speech and language centre on site, there is plentiful provision for students who require specialist provision, whilst remaining within the mainstream academy.
