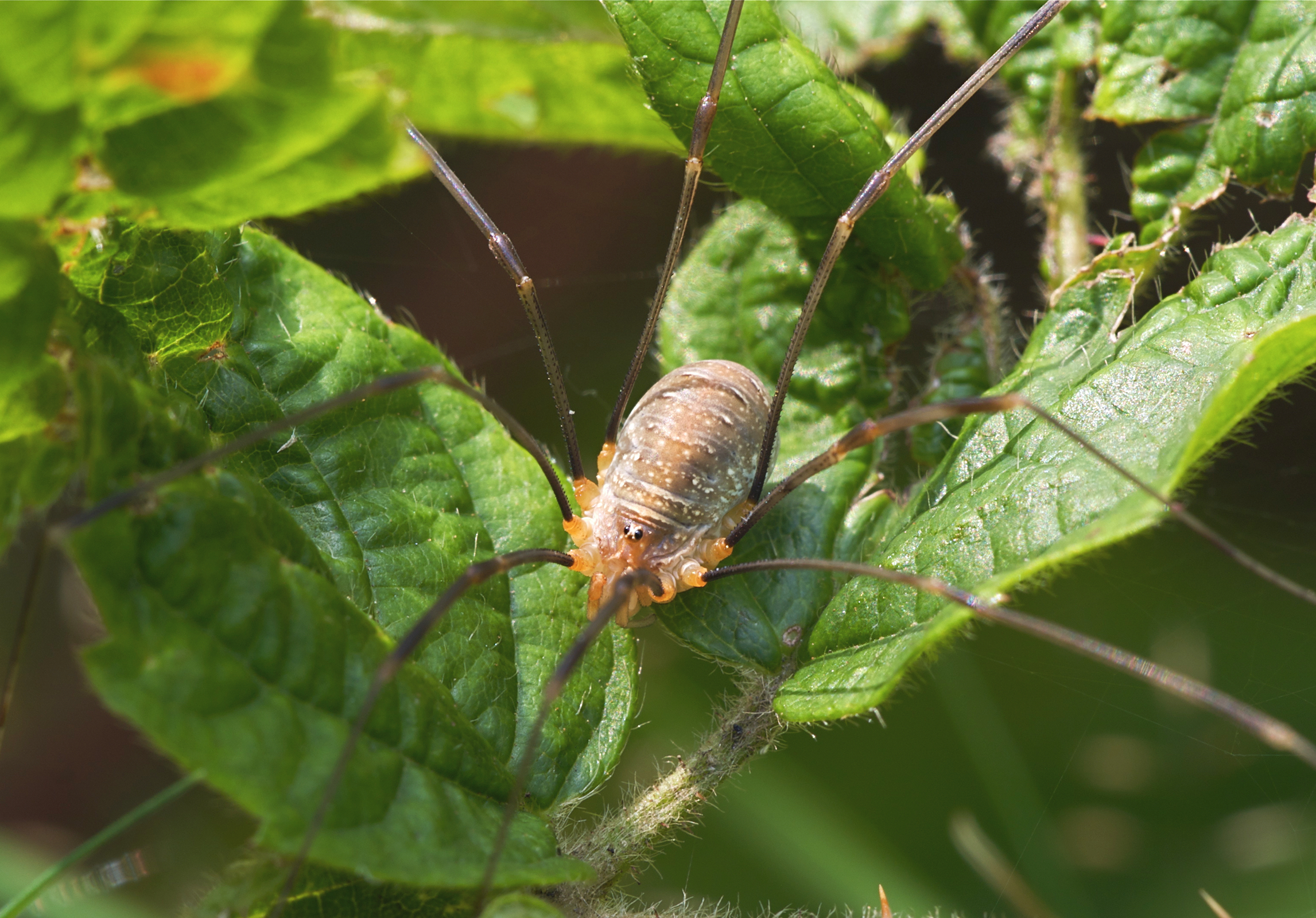

Scientific classification
- Kingdom: Animalia
- Phylum: Arthropoda
- Subphylum: Chelicerata
- Class: Arachnida
- Order: Opiliones
- Family: Phalangiidae
- Genus: Opilio
- Species: O. canestrinii

Binomial name
- Opilio canestrinii (Thorell, 1876)

Synonyms
- Phalangium canestrinii Opilio zangherii Opilio aspromontanus

= Opilio canestrinii =

Species of harvestman/daddy longlegs

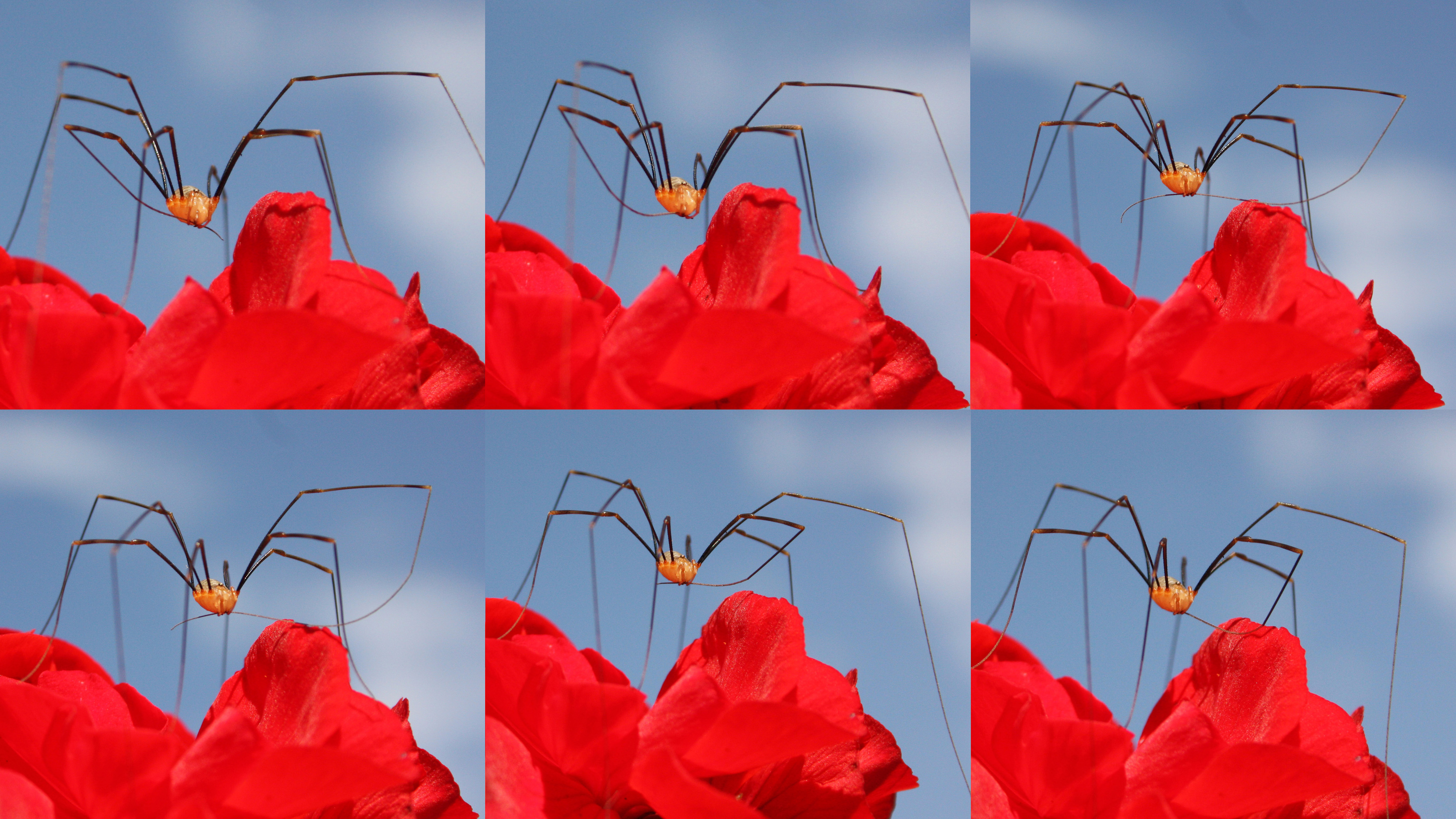
male cleaning legs

Opilio canestrinii, commonly called Canestrini's harvestman is a species of harvestman arachnid.

Males reach a body length up to 6 mm, females up to 8 mm. While males are yellowish brown to reddish, females are lighter. Males have dark legs, but yellow coxae and "knees"; the legs of females show alternating light and dark rings. The backs of females sport a dark, saddle-like pattern with a light longitudinal stripe in the middle. Adults can be found from June to December.

Opilio canestrinii probably originates from Italy, but has invaded Central Europe since the late 1970s, and has since almost everywhere replaced the similar O. parietinus. It is most often found on house walls.
