= Pett =

Village in East Sussex, England

Coordinates: 50.89°N 0.66°E

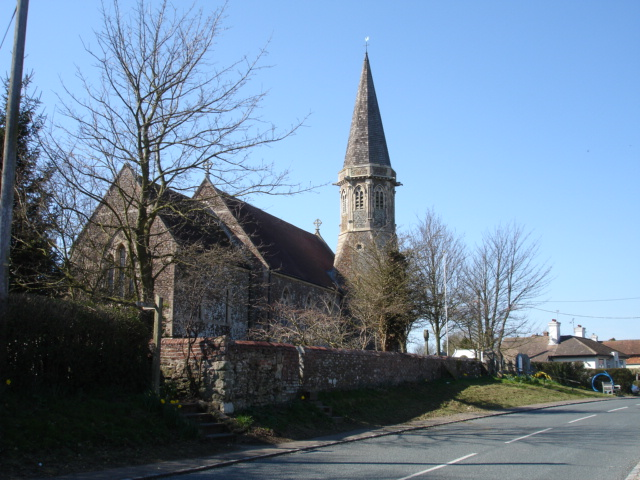
- St Mary and St Peter's Church, Pett

- Location within East Sussex
- Area: 6.5 km^{2} (2.5 sq mi)
- Population: 846 (Parish-2011)
  - Density: 311/sq mi (120/km^{2})
- OS grid reference: TQ873139
  - London: 54 miles (87 km) NW
- District: Rother
- Shire county: East Sussex
- Region: South East
- Country: England
- Sovereign state: United Kingdom
- Post town: HASTINGS
- Postcode district: TN35
- Dialling code: 01424
- Police: Sussex
- Fire: East Sussex
- Ambulance: South East Coast
- UK Parliament: Hastings and Rye

Pett is a village and civil parish in the Rother district of East Sussex, England. The village is located 5 miles (8.0 km) north-east of Hastings on the edge of Pett Level, the one-time marshes stretching along the coast of Rye Bay.

The road through the village leads down to the second village in the parish: Pett Level, the coastal part of which is known as Cliff End. Here there is a beach and, as the name suggests, the Weald sandstone cliffs reach their easternmost point. Pett Level marks the end of both the Royal Military Canal and the western end of the 1940s sea defence wall. The Saxon Shore Way passes through Pett Level. Pett parish church is dedicated to St Mary and St Peter. Pett also has a Methodist chapel, and a small Church of England church at Cliff End.

== History ==
The manor of Pett belonged to a succession of families, including the Halle family, the Levett family, the Fletchers and the Medleys, before eventually passing to the Earls of Liverpool.

Between early 1913 until 1916, a secluded bungalow in Pett Level was the home of sculptor Jacob Epstein and his wife Peggy. Using the garden shed there as a studio, during these three years Epstein produced a number of notable works.

Pett Level has had an independent lifeboat service since 1970, serving the coastal and inland waters between Hastings and Camber.

== Landmarks ==
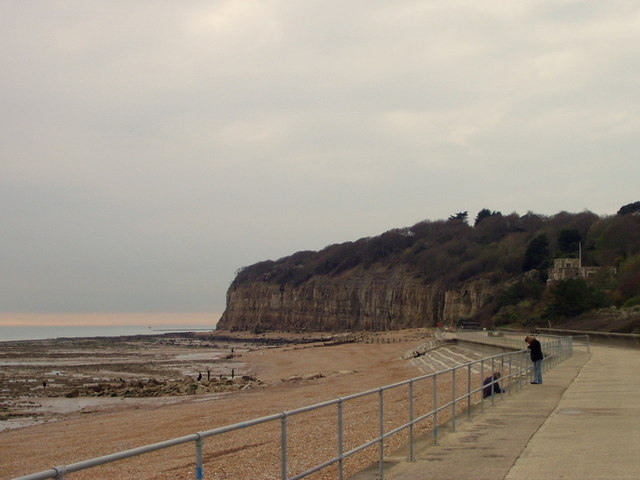
Cliff End at Pett Level showing the beach in the foreground, The ancient forest and the end of the sandstone cliffs in the distance.

There is a Site of Special Scientific Interest partly within the parish. Hastings Cliffs to Pett Beach runs along the coast and is of both biological and geological interest. The cliffs hold many fossils and have many habitats, including ancient woodland and shingle beaches. These include a sunken forest, a warship which is thought to have sunk in 1690, and a lost series of Martello towers. At Cliff End the beach has fossils and dinosaur footprints made by iguanodons and ankylosaurus up to 100m years ago in the Lower Cretaceous.

=== Sunken forest ===
A sunken forest can be seen in the sand at low tide in the shore opposite the levels. The forest stood around 6500 years ago, before the melting of the glaciers after the last ice age raised sea levels. The forest can be seen as spongy wooden roots, fallen trunks and tree stumps across large areas in the sand. Sea conditions may bury the remains in sand from time to time until uncovered again by storms. The trees have been identified as oak, birch, and hazel.

=== Wreck of HMS Anne ===
HMS Anne was a 70-gun third rate ship of the line of the English Royal Navy, launched in 1678. She was badly damaged at the Battle of Beachy Head on 30 June 1690. Her captain beached her and she was set on fire to prevent capture by the French. Her remains were discovered when the vessel was partly dug up by a mechanical excavator in 1974. The wreck is usually exposed by low tides which are below 0.6m above the chart datum (Dover). She lies in sand on a firm clay substrate on top of the prehistoric submerged forest. An explanatory panel is placed opposite her location on the sea wall.

== In popular culture ==
Pett Level beach was the filming location for parts of the video of David Bowie's 1980 number one hit single "Ashes to Ashes." Jonathan Miller filmed the beach scenes for his 1966 TV film of Alice in Wonderland at Pett Level. Sir John Gielgud played the Mock Turtle and Malcolm Muggeridge was the Gryphon.

Pett Level is the name of a song by the band Keston Cobblers Club.
