= Opilio lepidus =

Scientific classification
- Kingdom: Animalia
- Phylum: Arthropoda
- Subphylum: Chelicerata
- Class: Arachnida
- Order: Opiliones
- Family: Phalangiidae
- Genus: Opilio
- Species: O. lepidus

Binomial name
- Opilio lepidus (L. Koch, 1878)

Species of harvestman/daddy longlegs

Opilio lepidus is a species of harvestman in the Phalangiidae family. In 1937, members of the species were found in Lankaran, Azerbaijan.
