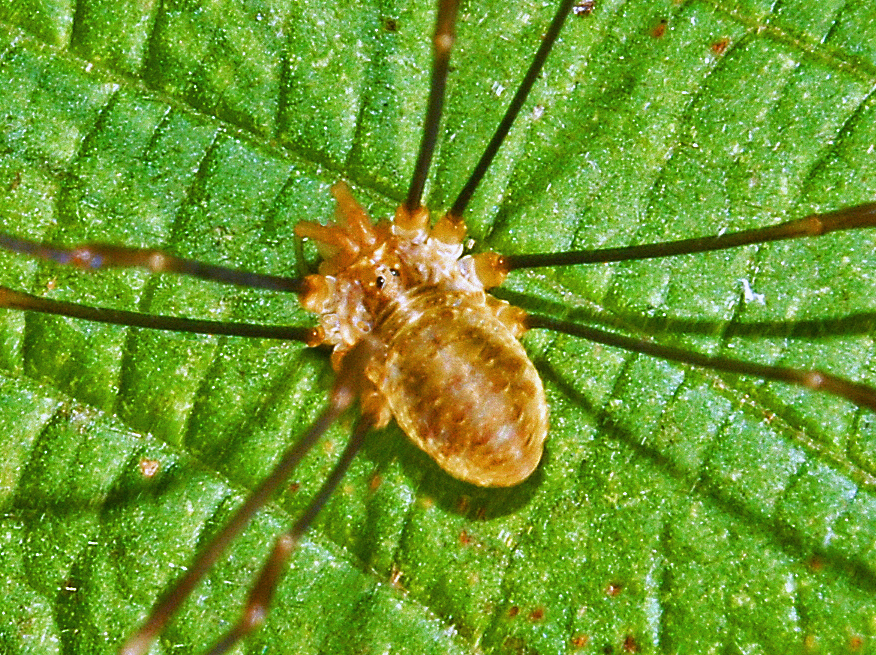
- Opilio canestrinii

Scientific classification
- Domain: Eukaryota
- Kingdom: Animalia
- Phylum: Arthropoda
- Subphylum: Chelicerata
- Class: Arachnida
- Order: Opiliones
- Family: Phalangiidae
- Subfamily: Opilioninae
- Genus: Opilio; Herbst, 1798

Type species
- Opilio parietinus (De Geer, 1778)

Species
- 35, see text

= Opilio =

Genus of harvestmen/daddy longlegs

Opilio is a genus of harvestmen with 35 known species.

== Name ==
The genus name is derived from Latin opilio "sheep-master" (a kind of slave), used by Plautus, also used by Virgil with the meaning "shepherd".

== Species ==
Opilio contains the following thirty-five species:

- Opilio afghanus Roewer, 1960
- Opilio apsheronicus Snegovaya, 2005
- Opilio arborphilus Snegovaya, 2010
- Opilio canestrinii (Thorell, 1876)
- Opilio caucasicus Snegovaya, 2010
- Opilio coxipunctus (Sørensen, 1911)
- Opilio decoratus Koch, 1878
- Opilio dinaricus Šilhavý, 1938
- Opilio ejuncidus (Thorell, 1876)
- Opilio grasshoffi Staręga, 1986
- Opilio hemseni Roewer, 1952
- Opilio himalincola Martens, 1973
- Opilio insulae Roewer, 1956
- Opilio kakunini Snegovaya, Cokendolpher & Mozaffarian, 2018
- Opilio lederi Roewer, 1911
- Opilio lepidus Koch, 1879
- Opilio magnus Hadži, 1973
- Opilio minutus Meade, 1855
- Opilio morini Snegovaya, 2016
- Opilio nabozhenkoi Snegovaya, 2010
- †Opilio ovalis Berendt & Koch, 1854
- Opilio parietinus (De Geer, 1778)
- Opilio putnik Karaman, 1999
- Opilio ravennae Spoek, 1962
- Opilio rossicus Snegovaya, 2016
- Opilio rutilus Morin, 1934
- Opilio ruzickai Šilhavý, 1938
- Opilio saxatilis Koch, 1839
- Opilio setipenis Snegovaya, 2008
- Opilio shirvanicus Snegovaya, 2005
- Opilio silhavyi Kratochvíl, 1936
- Opilio silvestris Snegovaya, 2010
- Opilio transversalis Roewer, 1956
- Opilio trispinifrons Roewer, 1911
- Opilio validus Roewer, 1959
