= Will Wood (footballer) =

English footballer

Personal information
- Full name: William Nicholas Wood
- Date of birth: 29 November 1996 (age 29)
- Place of birth: Burgess Hill, England
- Height: 1.74 m (5 ft 9 in)
- Position: Left back

Team information
- Current team: Welling United

Youth career
- 2008–2018: Southampton

Senior career*
Years	Team	Apps	(Gls)
2018–2019	Accrington Stanley	4	(0)
2018–2019	→ Havant & Waterlooville (loan)	8	(0)
2019–2020	Dagenham & Redbridge	4	(0)
2020–2022	Ebbsfleet United	30	(3)
2022–2023	Dulwich Hamlet	28	(3)
2023–	Welling United	7	(0)
- * Club domestic league appearances and goals as of 14:19, 28 January 2024 (UTC)

William Nicholas Wood (born 29 November 1996) is an English footballer who plays as a left back for Welling United.

== Early and personal life ==
Wood grew up in Burgess Hill and attended Oakmeeds Community College.

== Career ==
Wood joined Southampton at the age of 11, signing a three-year professional contract in April 2015. He trialled with Portsmouth in December 2017, and signed a one-year contract with Accrington Stanley in May 2018. He made his professional debut on 14 August 2018, in the EFL Cup. In October 2018 he moved on loan to Havant & Waterlooville.

He was released by Accrington at the end of the 2018–19 season.

He signed for Dagenham & Redbridge in June 2019, and stated that he was looking forward to playing for the club. Wood only made four appearances for the Daggers as the season was curtailed due to COVID-19 and he was subsequently released at the end of the campaign.

On 19 August 2020 he signed for recently relegated National League South side Ebbsfleet United on a free transfer.

On 8 July 2022, Wood signed for Dulwich Hamlet.

In May 2023, Wood signed for Welling United.

== Career statistics ==
As of match played 29 April 2023

Appearances and goals by club, season and competition
Club	Season	League			FA Cup		League Cup		Other		Total	
Club	Season	Division	Apps	Goals	Apps	Goals	Apps	Goals	Apps	Goals	Apps	Goals
Southampton U23	2017–18	—			—		—		3 (Note: Appearance(s) in EFL Trophy)	0	3	0
Accrington Stanley	2018–19	League One	4	0	—		1	0	1	0	6	0
Havant & Waterlooville (loan)	2018–19	National League	8	0	1	0	—		—		9	0
Dagenham & Redbridge	2019–20	National League	4	0	0	0	—		0	0	4	0
Ebbsfleet United	2020–21	National League South	14	1	2	0	—		2 (Note: Appearance(s) in FA Trophy)	0	18	1
Ebbsfleet United	2021–22	National League South	16	2	2	0	—		1	0	19	2
Ebbsfleet United	Total		30	3	4	0	0	0	3	0	37	3
Dulwich Hamlet	2022–23	National League South	28	3	2	0	—		3 (Note: One appearance in the FA Trophy, two appearances in the London Senior Cup.)	0	33	3
Career total			74	6	7	0	1	0	10	0	92	6
