= The St Leonards Academy =

Location
- St Leonards-on-Sea; Hastings, East Sussex; England
- Coordinates: 50.8559°N 0.5351°E

Information
- Type: Academy
- Department for Education URN: 136400 Tables
- Principal: Jon Francies
- Gender: Coeducational
- Age: 11 to 12

The St Leonards Academy is a coeducational secondary school with academy status, located in the St Leonards-on-Sea area of Hastings in East Sussex.

The St Leonards Academy was established in September 2011 from a merger of Filsham Valley School and The Grove School. The school operates on the Filsham Valley site on Edinburgh Road, and continues to coordinate with East Sussex County Council for admissions. The school is federated with Hastings Academy in the form of The Hastings Academies Trust as part of the University of Brighton Academies Trust

The school is sponsored by the University of Brighton, British Telecom, and East Sussex County Council, and has specialisms in mathematics and ICT (Information and Communications Technology). It offers BTECs and GCSEs as programmes of study for pupils.

== Facilities ==
The St Leonards Academy boasts a range of facilities available for the students use, including grass pitches, hard courts, 3G All-Weather pitch, drama studio and climbing wall.

They further provide specialist support for students experiencing special educational needs and disabilities, in The Cove. A dedicated area of the academy, whilst remaining within mainstream education
