= Hastings Country Park =

Country park in East Sussex, England

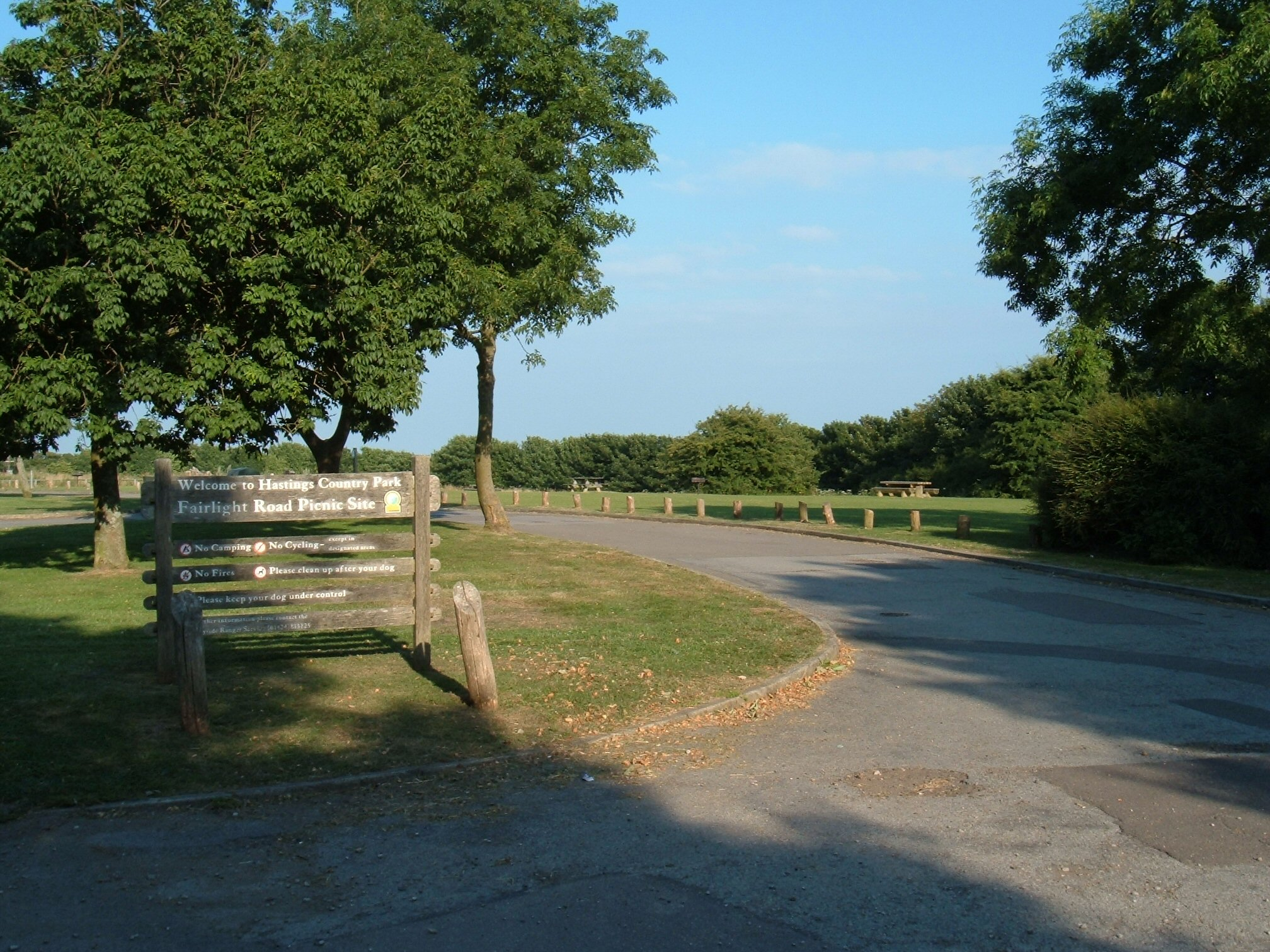

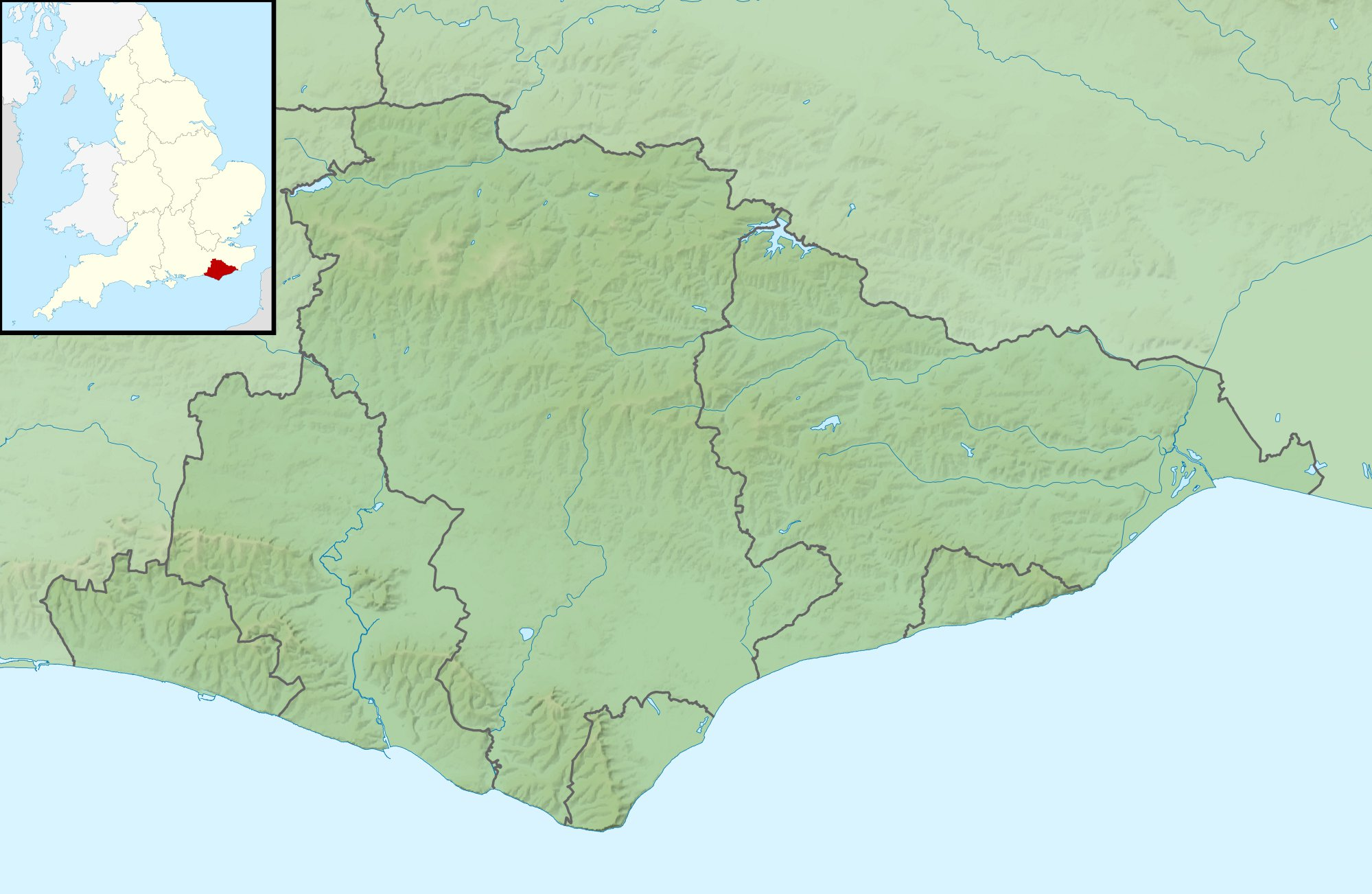
- Location within East Sussex
- Type: Woodland
- Location: Hastings, East Sussex, England
- OS grid: TQ 848 117
- Coordinates: 50°52′19″N 0°38′20″E
- Area: 660 acres (2.7 km^{2})
- Created: 1974 or earlier
- Operator: Hastings Borough Council
- Open: 7 days a week, dawn until dusk
- Status: Open all year

Hastings Country Park was formed in 1974 and covers 345 hectares (850 acres) east of Hastings in England. Sandstone cliffs, glens covered with gorse and trees, footpaths, nature trails, picnic areas and ample car parking are some of the features at the country park. Set in the High Weald Area of Outstanding Natural Beauty, it is also a Local Nature Reserve as Hastings Country Park & Fairlight Place Farm. An area of 184.5 hectares (456 acres) has been designated Hastings Cliffs Special Area of Conservation. Most of the park is in Hastings Cliffs to Pett Beach Site of Special Scientific Interest and it is also part of Hastings Cliffs Special Area of Conservation and Dungeness, Romney Marsh and Rye Bay Special Protection Area. Two areas in the park are Geological Conservation Review sites.

== History ==
The park supported considerable human activity in prehistoric times. Archaeological finds and landmarks date from Palaeolithic, Mesolithic, Neolithic, Bronze Age, Iron Age, Romano-British, Saxon, Medieval, post-Medieval, Victorian to World War II periods.

A large majority of the park has been identified as an Area of Archaeological Interest, within which, a large area of the East Hill is a designated Ancient Monument.

== Wildlife ==
Many rare and scarce liverworts, mosses and lichens occur within the ghylls or ravines. Peregrines, black redstarts and fulmars breed on the cliffs. Dartford warblers, stonechats and yellowhammers breed on the gorse-covered hillsides. Many migrants pass through the site in spring and autumn and usually include a few rarities such as Sardinian warbler, red-rumped swallow, and Pallas's leaf warbler, which have all occurred in recent years.

== See also ==
- Fairlight
- Fairlight Glen
- Speckled Wood, Hastings
