= Ore, East Sussex =

Suburb of Hastings, England

Coordinates: 50.8721°N 0.6085°E

Ore
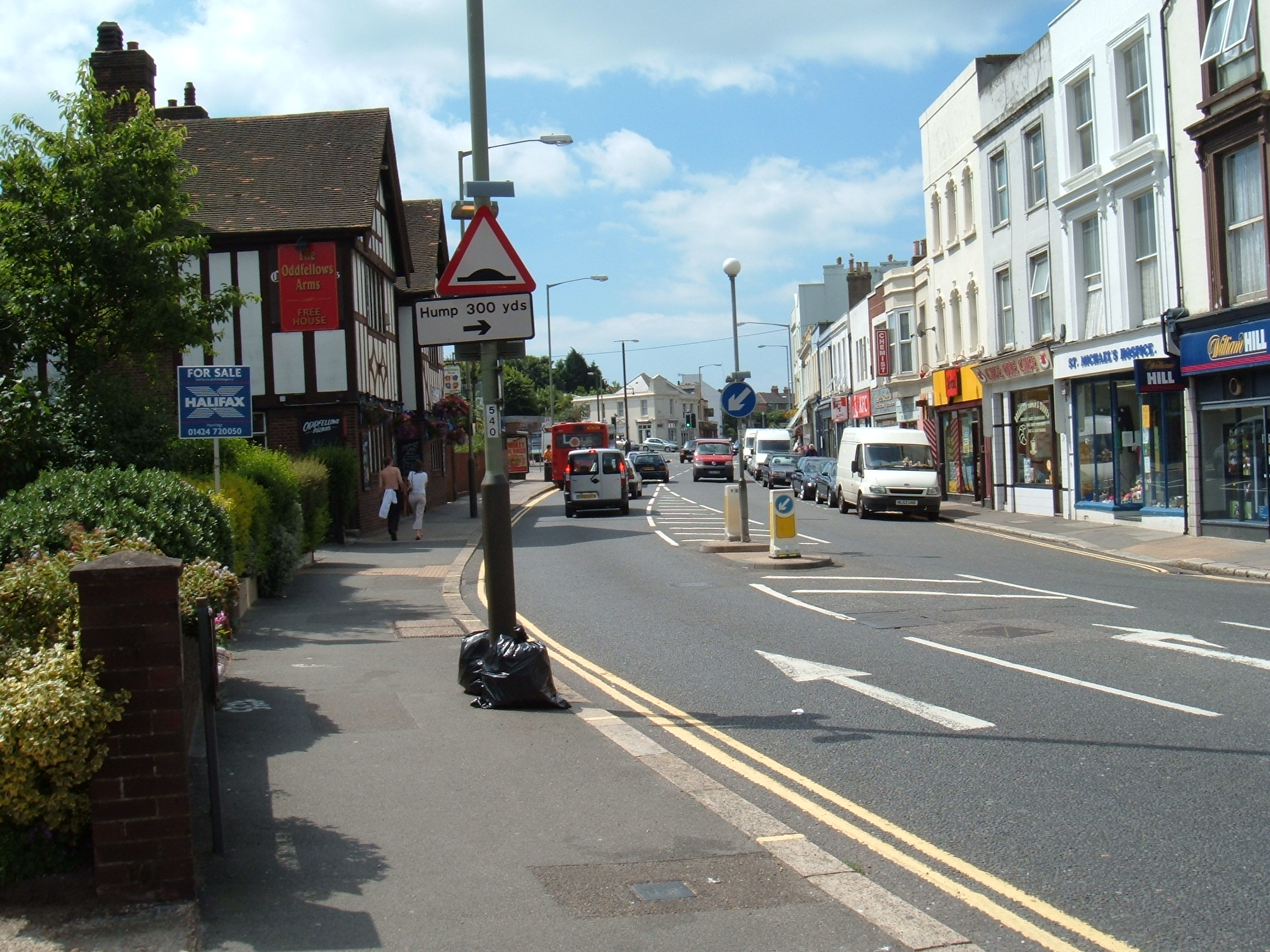
- High Street

- Location within East Sussex
- Population: 5,195 (2011.Ward)
- OS grid reference: TQ836113
- District: Hastings
- Shire county: East Sussex
- Region: South East
- Country: England
- Sovereign state: United Kingdom
- Post town: HASTINGS
- Postcode district: TN34; TN35
- Dialling code: 01424
- Police: Sussex
- Fire: East Sussex
- Ambulance: South East Coast
- UK Parliament: Hastings and Rye

Ore is a large suburb of the urban area of Hastings, East Sussex, England. Formerly a village, it is still known and advertised locally as "Ore Village". It is located 1.3 miles (2.1 km) to the north-east of Hastings town centre, on the main A259 road to Rye. Its name may have originated from the Old English word for "stream-bank". The Ore Stream still runs through a large central Woodland area known locally as Speckled Wood at the top of the Valley. It is the largest suburb of Hastings.

Ore Valley lies to the west of Ore Village, and is the site of Ore Railway Station and the former Broomgrove power station. It is also the site of the Hastings Millennium Community regeneration project.

== Rail transport ==
Ore Railway Station (one mile from Ore main street/Ore Village) lies on the Marshlink Line; with the former maintenance depot for the trains from London, and the coast (via the East Coastway Line and Hastings Line). Ore station lies northeast of Hastings station and south of Three Oaks (formerly Three Oaks and Guestling Halt).

The routes available from Ore Railway Station include: Ashford Intl - Eastbourne, Ore - London Victoria, Ore - Brighton

== Religious institutions ==
Ore is divided into two ecclesiastical parishes, and so has two Anglican Parish Churches; these are Christ Church, Ore, and St Helen's, Ore. The latter gives its name (St Helens) to a distinct district of the Ore community. The church was built in 1868, to replace an ancient church dating from the reign of Edward III, which now stands in ruins nearby.

Other religious buildings in Ore include a Seventh-day Adventist Church, Clifton Road Methodist church, and a Salvation Army unit. Hastings cemetery and crematorium, with its own chapel, is situated in the St Helens area of Ore.

== Education ==
Ore Valley has the Ore Valley Campus of Sussex Coast College Hastings on Parker Road. Hastings Academy is in the nearby Red Lake district of Ore.

Primary schools:

- All Saints CE Junior
- Blacklands CP
- The Baird Primary Academy (formerly known as Elphinstone Junior school)
- Ore Village Primary Academy (formerly known as Red Lake Community Primary School)
- Sacred Heart RC
- Sandown CP

Secondary schools:

- Ark Alexandra Academy
- Hastings Academy

== Civil parish ==
In 1951 the parish had a population of 355. On 1 April 1958 the parish was abolished and merged with Guestling and Westfield.

== See also ==
- List of places of worship in Hastings
