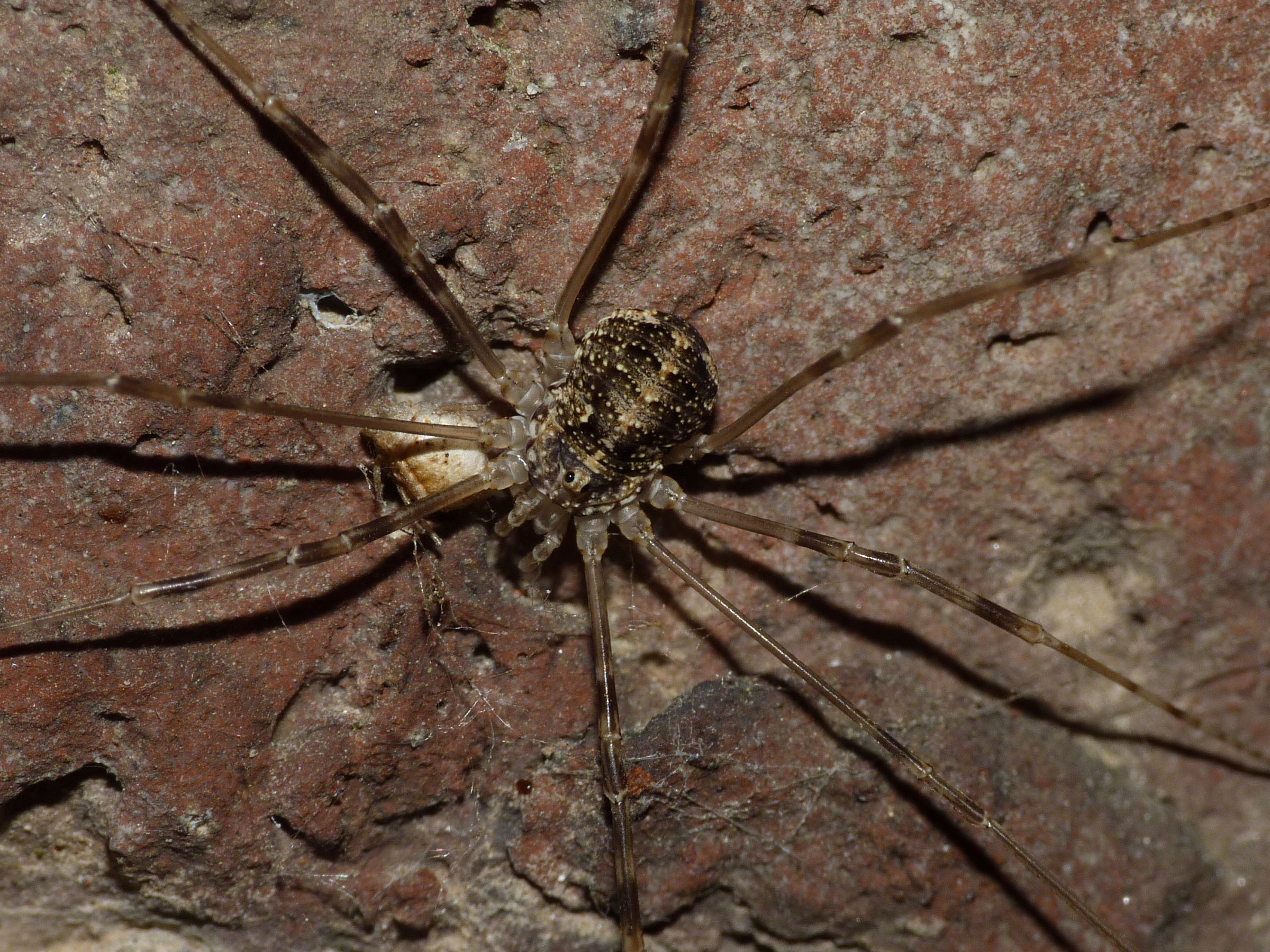

Scientific classification
- Kingdom: Animalia
- Phylum: Arthropoda
- Subphylum: Chelicerata
- Class: Arachnida
- Order: Opiliones
- Family: Phalangiidae
- Genus: Opilio
- Species: O. parietinus

Binomial name
- Opilio parietinus (De Geer, 1778)

Synonyms
- Phalangium parietinum Opilio longipes Opilio leucophaeus Phalangium cinereum Phalangium baumii Phalangium segmentatum

= Opilio parietinus =

Species of harvestman/daddy longlegs

Opilio parietinus is a species of harvestman found in Europe and North America. It is similar to O. canestrinii, but has dark spots on its coxae, and is generally more of a grayish green color. Like O. canestrini, it was often found on house walls in Central Europe, but has by now almost everywhere been replaced by this invasive species.

== Images ==
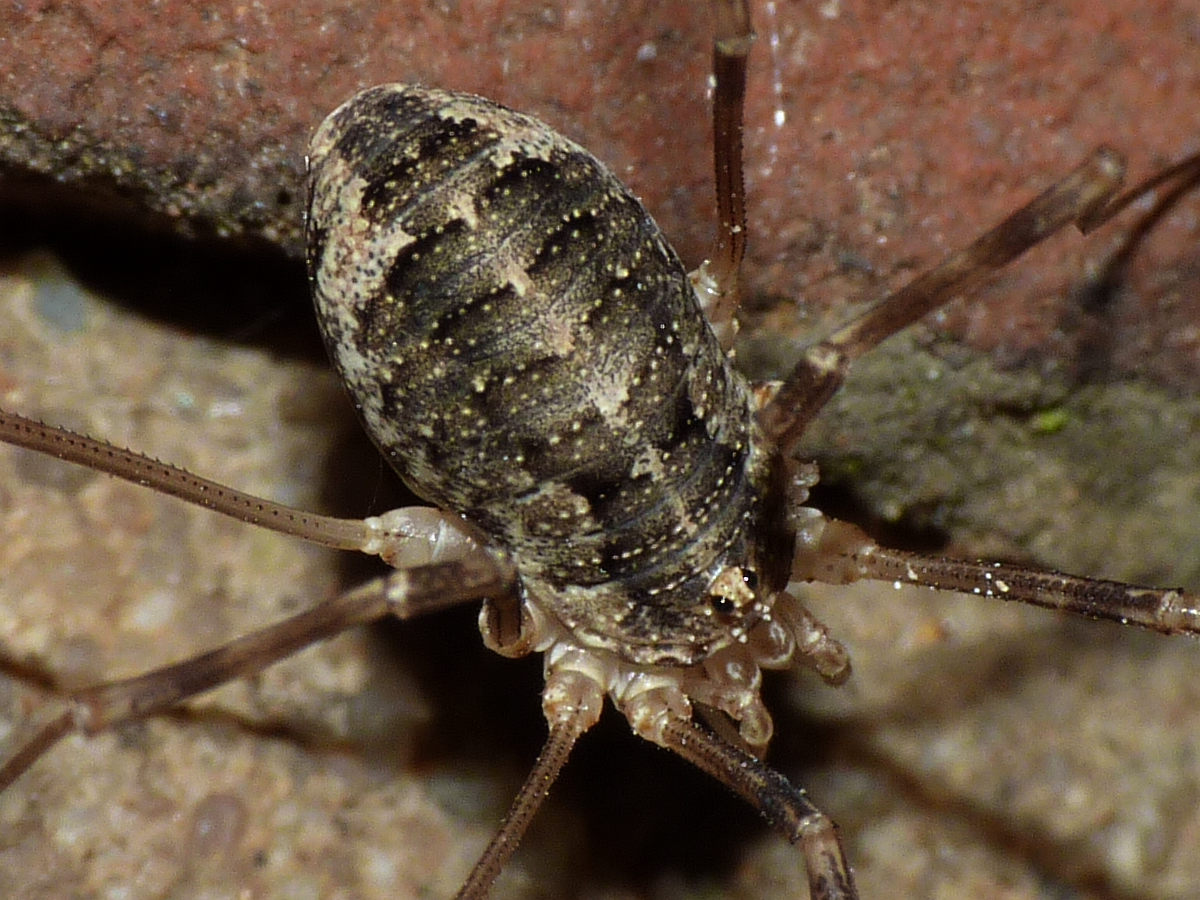
Female

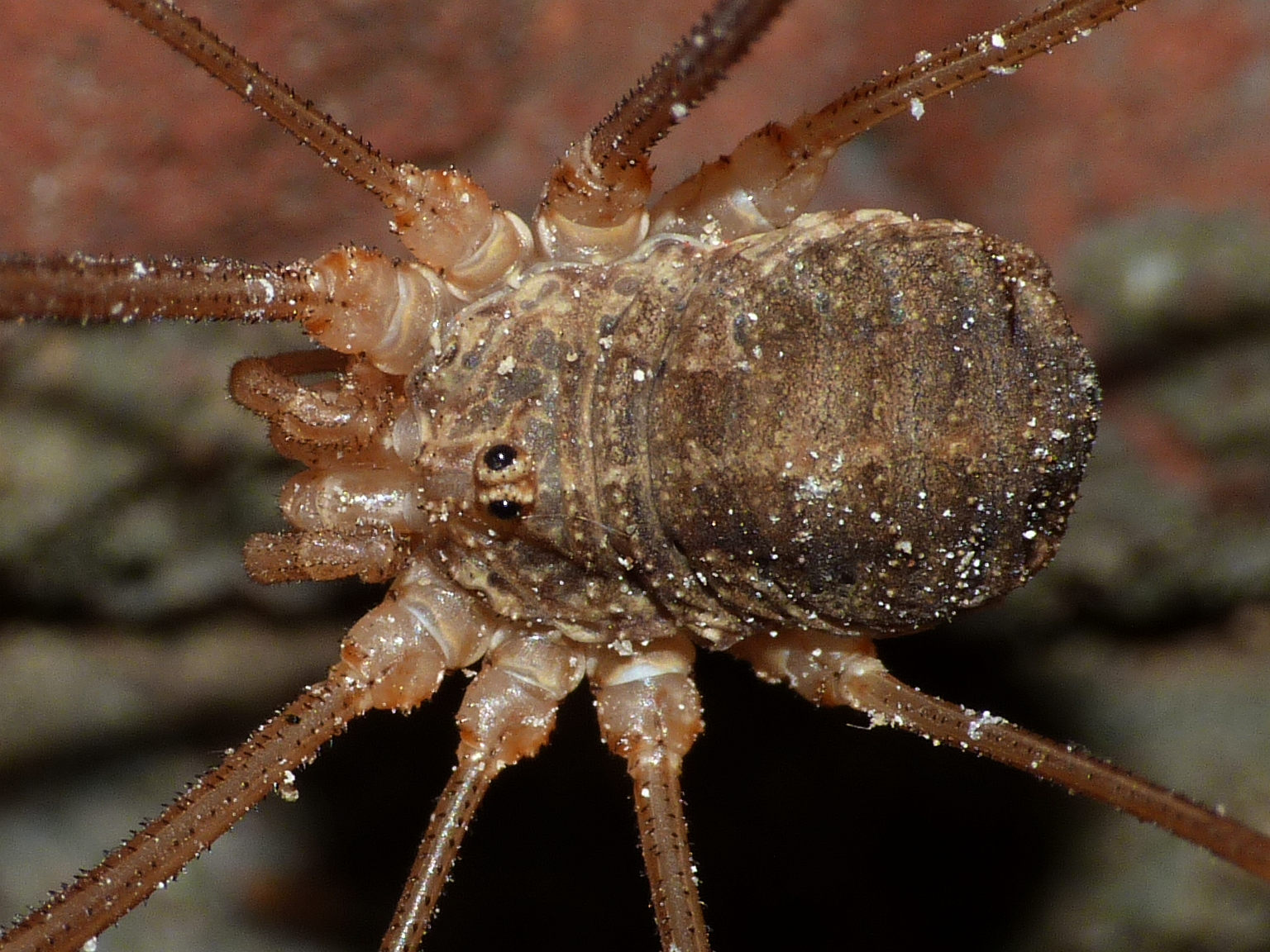
Male

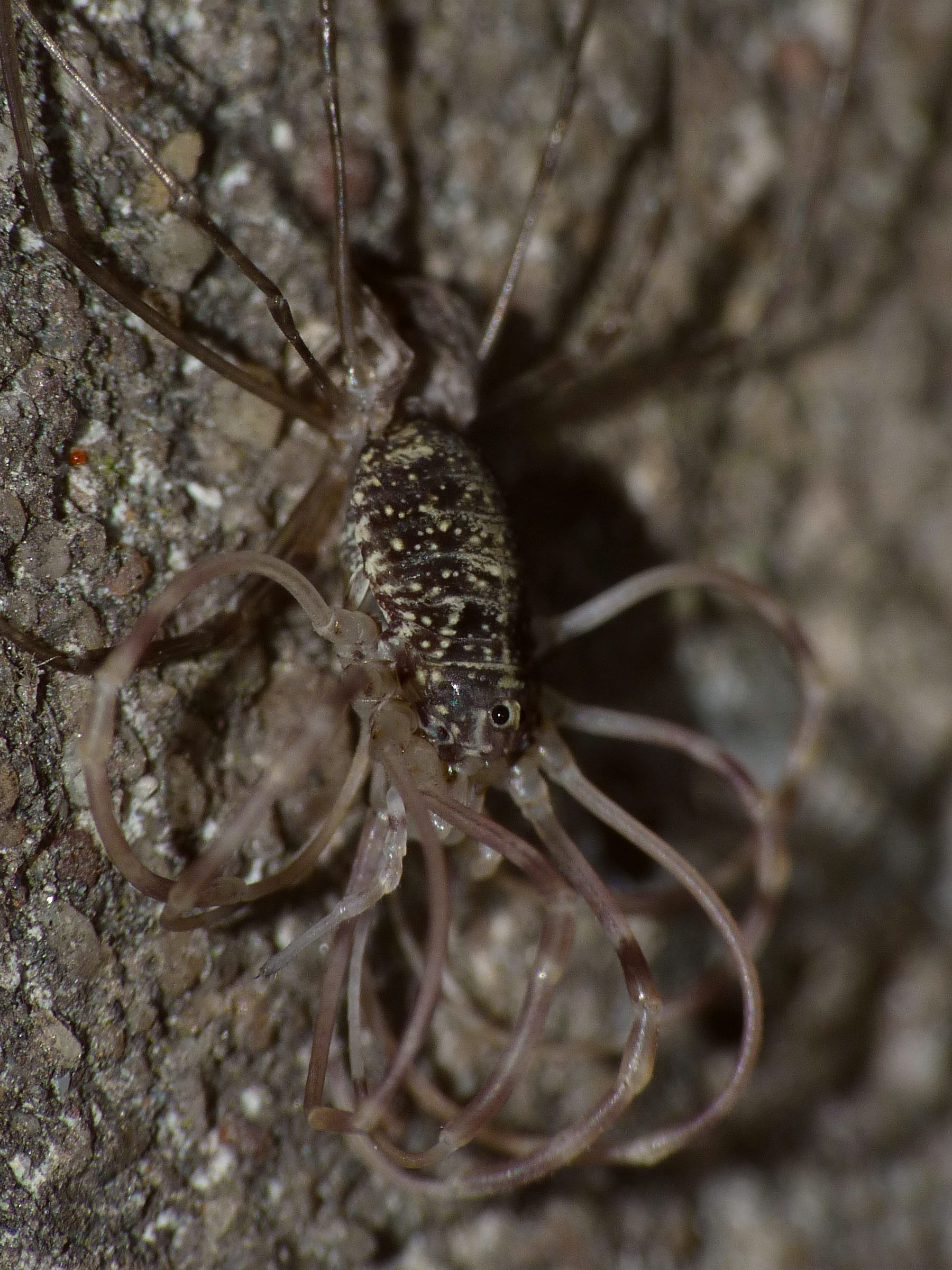
Moulting

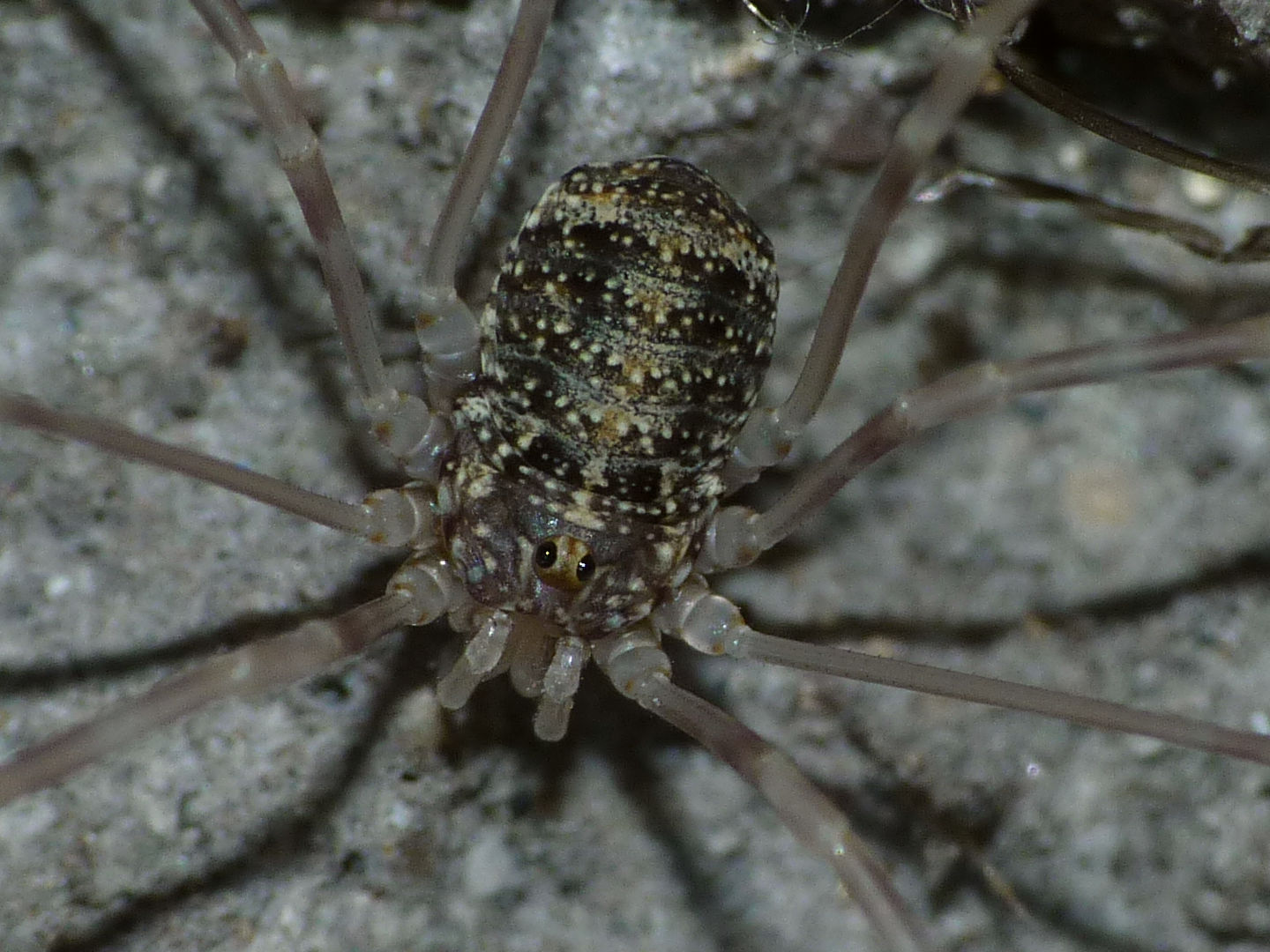
Moulted - subadult

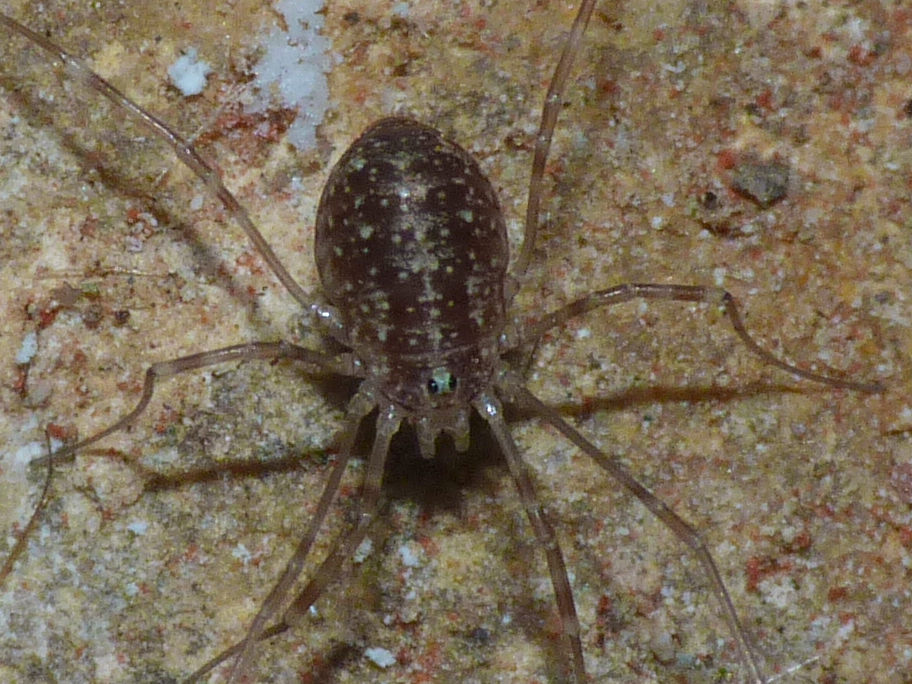
Juvenile
