= Emily Peasgood =

English composer

- Born: Emily Anne Peasgood; 8 April 1981 (age 45); Grimsby, Lincolnshire, England
- Occupations: Composer, sound artist, artist, author
- Years active: 2010s–present
- Awards: Ivors Composer Award for Sonic Art (2018)
- Website: emilypeasgood.com

Emily Anne Peasgood (born 1981 in Grimsby, Lincolnshire) is an Ivors Composer Awards winning English composer and sound artist.

Peasgood creates research-led and site specific interactive artworks for galleries and outdoor public spaces, ranging from large-scale community events to intimate sound installations. Peasgood is best known for her work in outdoor public locations with specific communities of people, often using innovative technology and design that visitors can interact with. Her work has been described as magical, evocative and memorable.

Peasgood was profiled by the i as the Hip Op Composer. In 2017 Peasgood delivered the TEDx Folkestone talk "Emily! Don't do that!".

Peasgood was awarded a PhD by Canterbury Christ Church University for her thesis Leading with Aesthetic: Creating Accessible, Inclusive and Engaging Musical Artworks Through Experimental Processes in the Community. Peasgood is a composition tutor at Canterbury Christ Church University. Peasgood is a co-author of The Work of the Military Wives Choirs and The perceived effects of singing on the health and well-being of wives and partners of members of the British Armed Forces: a cross-sectional survey.

== Sound Sculpture ==
In 2023 British Library commissioned Peasgood to create a listening desk as legacy for Unlocking Our Sound Heritage.

== Works ==
In 2014, Peasgood created Landscapes a choral work responding to the landscape artworks of J. M. W. Turner and Helen Frankenthaler. It premiered at the exhibition Making Painting: J.M.W. Turner and Helen Frankenthaler at Turner Contemporary.

In 2016 Peasgood premiered Lifted at Turner Contemporary. In the same year she premiered BIRDS, a sung and spoken word piece observing feminine ritual and behaviour through the lens of a documentary film narrator and Crossing Over, a piece commissioned by Turner Contemporary to premier as part of its event commemorating the Zong massacre as depicted on J. M. W. Turner's painting The Slave Ship (1840).

Peasgood's Halfway to Heaven won the prize for Sonic Art at the 2018 British Composer Awards (renamed the Ivors Composer Awards). In the same year, the "eerily evocative" Requiem for Cross Bones featured at MERGE Bankside and Peasgood created The Illusion of Conscious Thought for the East Hill Cliff Railway and West Hill Cliff Railway in Hastings as part of the Coastal Currents Arts Festival.

In 2019 Never Again was nominated for an Ivors Composer Award in the category of Community or Educational Project. In 2017 Peasgood was nominated in the same category for BIRDS and other Stories and Crossing Over.

== Solo exhibitions ==
- Sound at Sea, God's House Tower, Southampton, UK. Commissioned by a space arts, date TBC.
- Living Sound and Sidney Cooper's Living Room, Sidney Cooper Gallery, Canterbury, Kent, UK. A collection of recent works including a new commission Sidney Cooper's Living Room to celebrate the 150-year anniversary of the gallery. 12 January – 23 February 2019.

== Public art ==
- I would rather walk with you, West Wing Battery at Fort Burgoyne, Dover, UK. Commissioned for Pioneering Places by the Land Trust. Permanent, available from August 2021, date TBC.
- Katherine, St Clement's Church, Old Romney. A murder mystery in sound and music. Commissioned by Art in Romney Marsh. 21 September – 13 October 2019.
- Smack Boys, Sailor's Church, Military Road, Ramsgate, Kent, UK. Sound installation commissioned for Ramsgate Festival of Sound. 21–28 July 2019.
- The Illusion of Conscious Thought, East Hill Cliff Railway, West Hill Cliff Railway, Hastings, Sussex, UK. Two-part sound installation 'up' and 'down' movements that comment on social mobility and regeneration in contrasting parts of Hastings. Commissioned by Greig Burgoyne and Sweet and Dandy for Coastal Current Arts Festival. 1–30 September 2018.
- Requiem for Cross Bones, Crossbones Garden, Redcross Way, London Bridge, London, UK. Interactive sound installation on a post-medieval burial site. Commissioned by Illuminate Productions and Better Bankside for MERGE Bankside in partnership with Bankside Open Spaces Trust (BOST) and Tate Modern. June – July 2018.
- Halfway to Heaven, Bradstone Road Burial Ground, Folkestone, Kent, UK. Interactive synchronised sound installation and choral work. Commissioned by The Creative Foundation for Folkestone Triennial, 2017, curated by Lewis Biggs. 2 September – 5 November 2017.
- LIFTED, Turner Contemporary, Margate, Kent, UK. Choral work performed inside public lifts, with different movements for each floor. Funded by Arts Council England in partnership with Turner Contemporary. 17 January 2016.
- Landscapes, Turner Contemporary, Margate, Kent, UK. 4-part accessible song cycle and synthesis of art forms for community choir, visitors and deaf audiences. Inspired by the art of Helen Frankenthaler and J. M. W. Turner. Created in partnership with Turner Contemporary for the exhibition Making Painting: Helen Frankenhaler and J.M.W. Turner. 16 April 2014.

== Community artworks ==
- Cambridge North Folk Song Project, Cambridge. Commissioned by Brookgate and Network Rail. Community art project resulting in the creation of 36 folk songs and verses published in a copyright free songbook available at no cost, date TBC.
- Never Again, Strood Railway Station, Southeastern (train operating company) and Chatham Historic Dockyard, Kent, UK. 9-part song cycle for community choir, speaking voice and archival sound recordings. Commissioned by Ideas Test for Sea Folk Sing, a SparkedEcho production to commemorate the WW1 centenary of Armistice Day. Various performances on 10,11, 16 and 17 November 2018.
- VOICE100, Turner Contemporary, Margate, Kent, UK. Beat poem featuring the recorded voices of 100 women, men and children aged 5 – 98 in Thanet, Kent. Commissioned by POW! Festival for International Women's Day, 7 March 2018.
- BIRDS and other Stories, Turner Contemporary, Margate, Kent, UK. Collaborative community project resulting in an experimental choral work and graphic score, and an exhibition of stories from 30 members of the public. Commissioned by POW! Festival to celebrate International Women's Day. 11 March 2017.
- Crossing Over, Turner Contemporary, Margate, Kent, UK. Part of an event commemorating the Zong massacre as depicted in J. M. W. Turner's painting The Slave Ship (1840). 29 November 2016.
- BIRDS, Turner Contemporary and Resort Studios, Margate, Kent, UK. Commissioned by POW! Festival to celebrate International Women's Day. March 2016.

== Collaborative works ==
- 2021: Beacons, Sunny Sands Beach, Folkestone, Kent, UK. Collaborative and interactive experimental choral performance ritual to celebrate the end of a treasure-hunt that invited members of public to collect sea gooseberries to bring along. Collaboration between scenographer Alison Neighbour, interactive technologist Tarim and Peasgood as composer. March 2021, date TBC.
- Jeremy Deller's English Magic ft. Emily Peasgood, Melodians Steel Orchestra and the Big Sing. Arrangements of popular songs for community steel orchestra and community choir. Commissioned by Sounds Like Art and Turner Contemporary for the exhibition Jeremy Deller's English Magic. 11 October 2014.
- Collective Spirit – The Boat Project, Turner Contemporary, Margate, Kent, UK. Collective Spirit is a boat created for the 2012 London Cultural Olympiad, made from donated family heirlooms and parts of UK history. To celebrate its arrival at Margate Harbour, Peasgood was commissioned by Parrabbola to create an arrangement of Megan Henwood's song Collective Spirit for Regents Brass Band and The Big Sing community choir. 14 July 2012.
