= Marine Court =

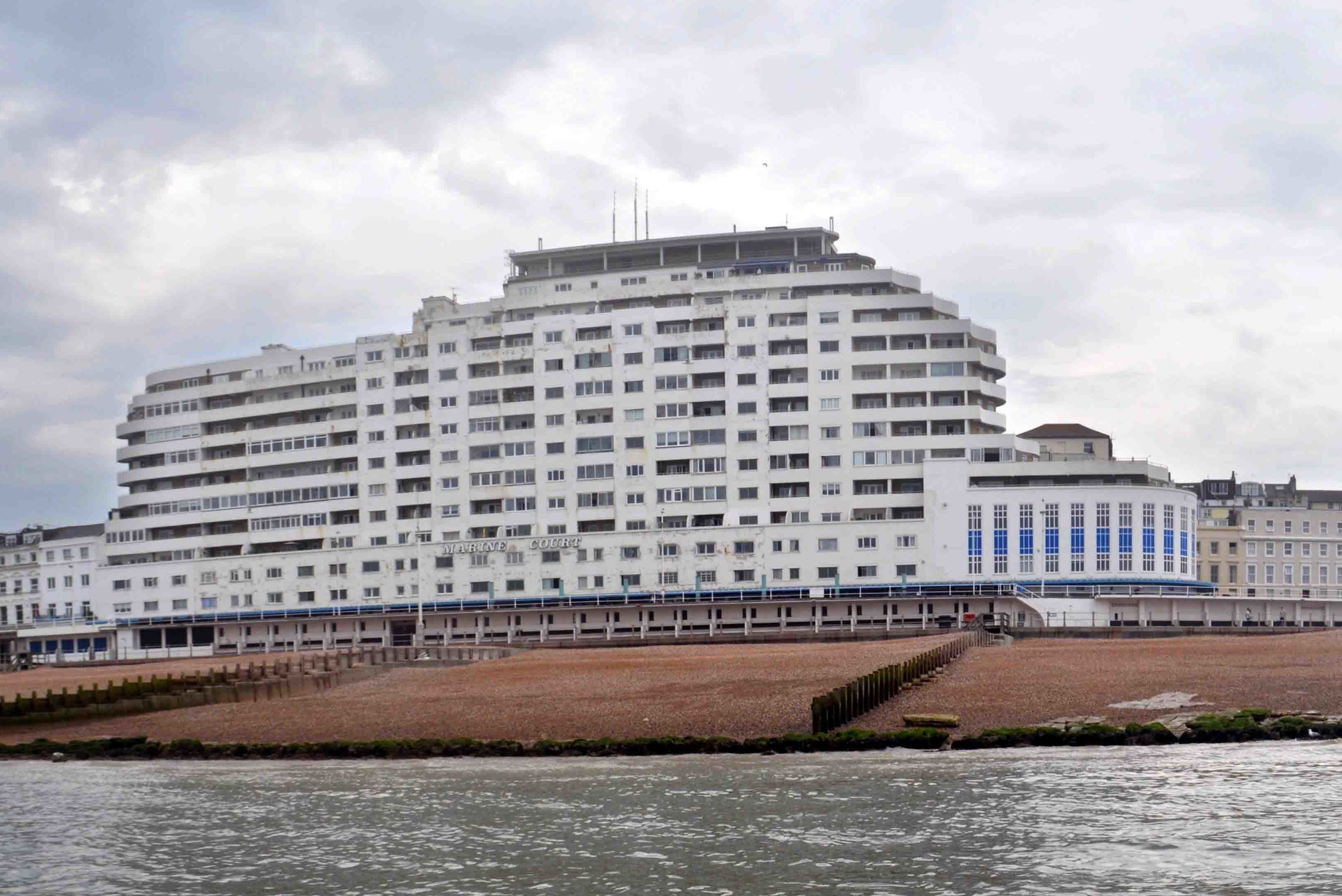
- Marine Court southern elevation

- Location within East Sussex
- 50.8510778°N 0.5549474°E
- Type: Apartment block
- Location: St Leonards-on-Sea

History
- Built: 1936–38

Site notes
- Height: 170 ft (52 m)
- Architect(s): Kenneth Dalgleish; Roger K Pullen
- Architectural styles: Streamline Moderne (Art Deco)

Listed Building – Grade II
- Official name: Marine Court
- Designated: 9 November 1999
- Reference no.: 1379435

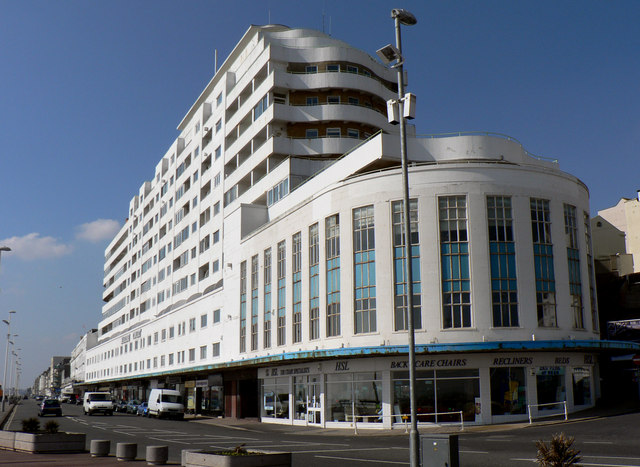
East elevation

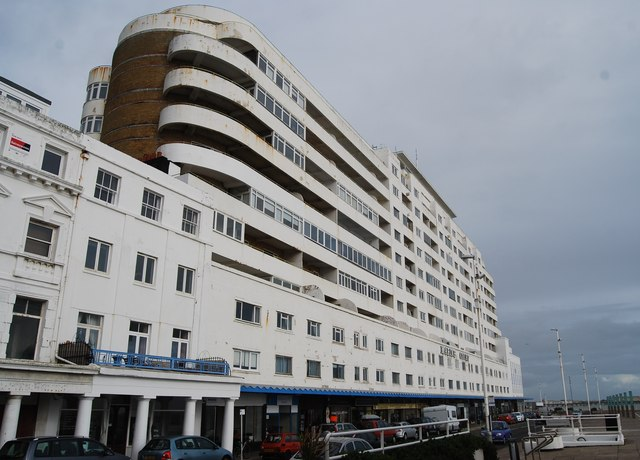
West elevation

Marine Court is a Grade II listed Streamline Moderne (Art Deco) apartment block on the seafront of St Leonards-on-Sea, part of the town and borough of Hastings in East Sussex, England. The block was built between 1936 and 1938 and was modelled on the recently launched Cunard ocean liner Queen Mary. The building is 14 stories high and the seafront elevation 416 ft (127 m) long. At the time of opening it was the tallest residential building in Britain.

== History ==
St Leonards had been built in the 1830s as a seaside resort but was in decline. Borough Engineer Sidney Little had instigated a new seafront for the borough, including a new promenade, an Olympic size Lido and underground car parks. Local estate agent Commander Bray purchased a row of 14 Victorian houses on the seafront for redevelopment. South Coast (Hastings and St. Leonards) Properties, Ltd. was set up to develop the project on the site of 22–32 Marina.

=== Design ===
The controversial design concept, which was opposed by local residents, was to emulate the lines of the RMS Queen Mary. The eastern end is curved and steps back as the building rises, the part housing the restaurant giving the impression of the ship's fo'c'sle. The western end of the building is also curved. All the apartments have balconies on the southern elevation resembling the promenade decks of the liner, and also step back as the building rises. The building originally had a rooftop bar.

It was envisaged that the development would function in a similar way to a residential hotel with liveried porters, waiters, valets and maids. Although making a strong statement, the building did not support the domestic lifestyle most people of the time aspired to.

A restaurant over two floors was included in the design, each floor capable of seating 500. The restaurants were capable of hosting dances and had their own separate entrance for non-residents. At the rear of the building were bedrooms and bathrooms for the use of residents' guests. There was also a large public lounge and other public rooms which were "furnished in exquisite taste and equipped in the most modern style".

The ground floor was given over to 20 shops with the pavement outside protected by a canopy. The shop fronts were originally painted black, with the rest of the building painted white. There are four separate entrances, each with a lift and stairs.

The interior was 'ultra-modern' and 'all-electric', including central heating, a gas cooker and a refrigerator. Hot water was supplied by a central boiler and 'air-conditioning' was installed using ducts and fans.

The original design concept drawing by perspectivist Raymond Myerscough-Walker, who had been commissioned by Roger Pullen, was hung in the Royal Academy in 1935 and later in the Hayward Gallery's 'Thirties' exhibition in 1979–80.

=== Construction ===
The building uses a steel frame with vertical lattice bracing to resist wind pressure with 11 in (280 mm) brick cavity external walls. Flat roofs and balcony fronts are reinforced concrete. Floors are made out of hollow blocks.

The original windows, now mostly replaced, were metal casements from Crittall Windows. Crittall used this in their advertising.

On 30 November 1936 the foundation stone of Marine Court was laid by Robert Holland-Martin, chairman of Southern Railway, who had plans to electrify the line to Hastings for the use of commuters.

800 workmen were directly employed during the construction, which used 2,000 tons of cement, 2,100 tons of steel and 1,400,000 bricks.

The projected budget of £400,000 was exceeded, and the final cost was nearly £500,000. Uptake of flats in the new scheme was slow, the South Coast (Hastings and St. Leonards) Properties company folded with debts of £330,000.

=== WW2 ===
Marine Court was requisitioned by the military in 1939 after the outbreak of WW2. It became the headquarters of the RAF's No1 ITW (Initial Training Wing) under the command of Acting Air Commodore Alfred Critchley and many of the trainees were accommodated in the building.

On 24 September 1942 seven Focke-Wulf Fw 190s of the Luftwaffe attacked Hastings seafront, bombing and strafing. A bomb hit the eastern end of Marine Court in the dining room killing 3 cadets and injuring about 12 others. Soon after the bombing the ITW moved to a safer location in Harrogate, Yorkshire.

=== Post war ===
Initially there was regular repainting and maintenance and the bomb damage to the block was repaired in 1949-50.

In the 1960s the restaurant was converted for use as a nightclub called the Witch Doctor. (Note: Also known as the Cobweb) Amongst the live acts appearing there were David Bowie and The Who.

Grade-II listed status was granted in 1999.

Maintenance became less regular and by 2000 the building was in need of major repairs. As well as deterioration, piecemeal replacement of windows and enclosure of balconies has given the building a disharmonious appearance. Hastings Borough Council put together a 5 year Conservation Management Plan in 2006 to renovate the building.

The management agents became bankrupt and, after a series of legal battles, the residents set up their own management company in 2010.
