= East Hill Cliff Railway =

Funicular railway in Hastings

Coordinates: 50°51′24.55″N 0°35′43.1″E

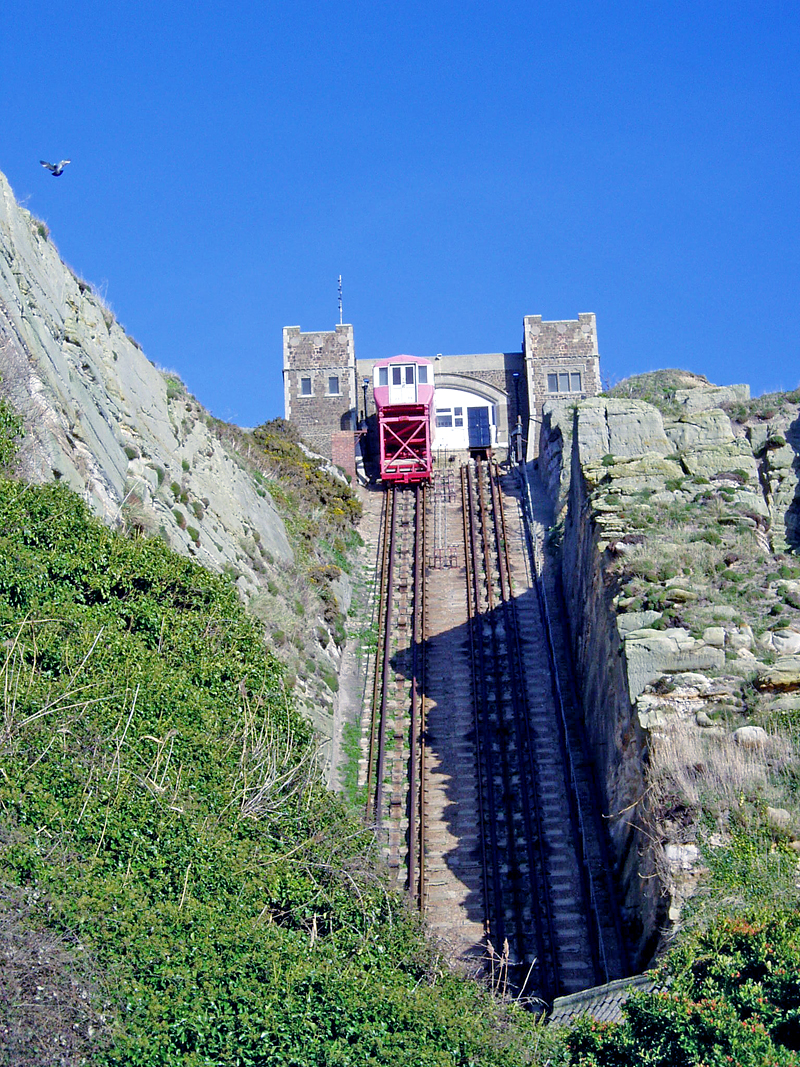
- The upper station and car in 2005, before closure and replacement

Overview
- Status: in use
- Locale: Hastings, United Kingdom

Service
- Type: Funicular
- Operator: Hastings Borough Council

History
- Opened: 1902

Technical
- Line length: 0.0505 mi (0.0813 km)
- Number of tracks: Double track
- Track gauge: 5 ft (1,524 mm)
- Maximum incline: 78%

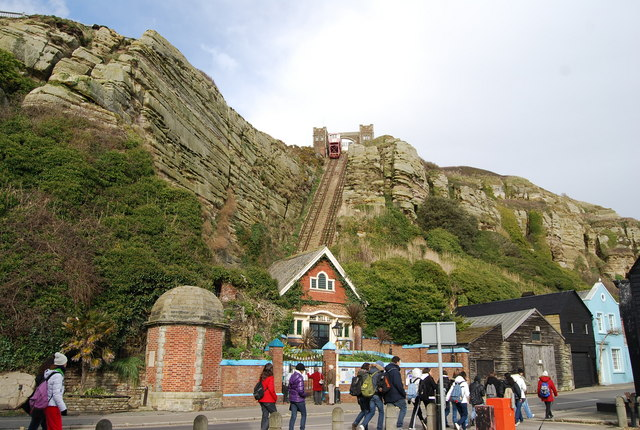
View of the line showing both stations

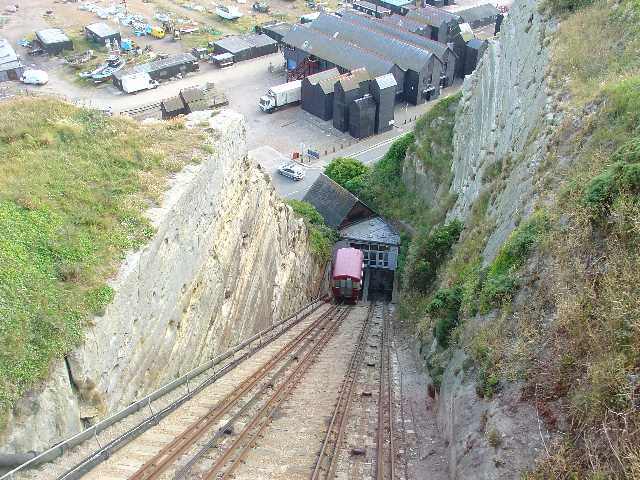
View down the line, also showing the distinctive net shops on the Stade

East Hill Cliff Railway, or East Hill Lift, is a funicular railway located in the English seaside town of Hastings. It provides access to Hastings Country Park via the East Hill, which overlooks the Old Town and Rock-a-Nore, an area to the east of Hastings. The line provides views over The Stade, home to the largest beach-launched fishing fleet in Europe.

The line is owned and operated by Hastings Borough Council and has the following technical parameters:

- Length: 267 feet (81 m)
- Gradient: 78%
- Cars: 2
- Capacity: 16 passengers per car
- Configuration: Double track
- Gauge: 5 ft (1,524 mm)
- Traction: Electricity

The line was opened in August 1902 by Hastings Borough Council. It was originally operated on the water balance principle, and the twin towers of the upper station contained water tanks for this purpose. The line was modernised between 1973 and 1976, during which time it was converted to electric operation and new cars were provided.

The line was shut in June 2007 because of an incident where a fault in a control panel caused the cars to fail to stop at the correct point, resulting in damage to both cars and stations. In 2008, Hastings Borough Council decided on a major refurbishment involving new cars and new control and safety systems, together with repairs to the damaged stations. The line reopened in March 2010.

Following the closure of lines in Broadstairs and Margate, the East Hill Cliff Railway is now the steepest funicular railway in the United Kingdom. It is complemented by the West Hill Cliff Railway, which provides access to Hastings Castle and the Smugglers Adventure in St. Clements Caves.

A model of the East Hill Cliff Railway is on public display at the Brighton Toy and Model Museum.

== See also ==
- List of funicular railways
