= West Hill Cliff Railway =

Funicular railway in Hastings, England

Coordinates: 50°51′20.43″N 0°35′16.08″E

A ride up the railway

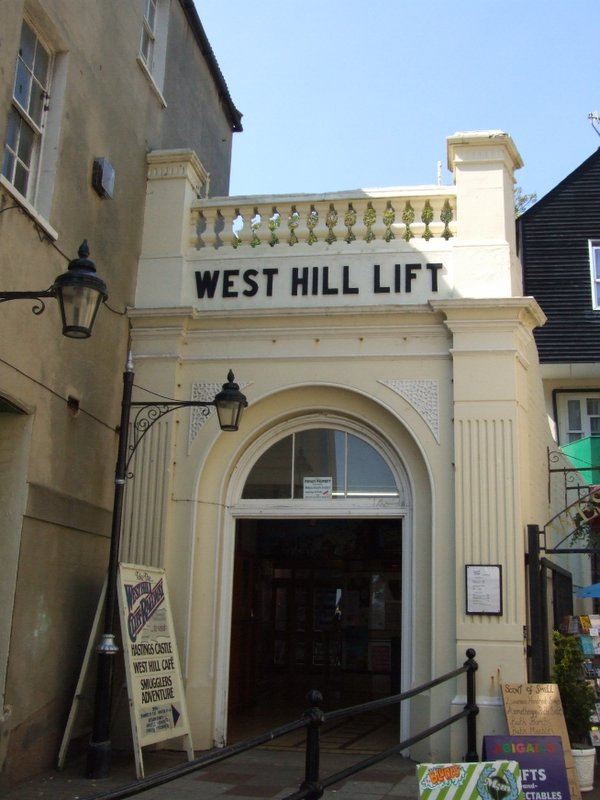
Bottom entrance to the railway

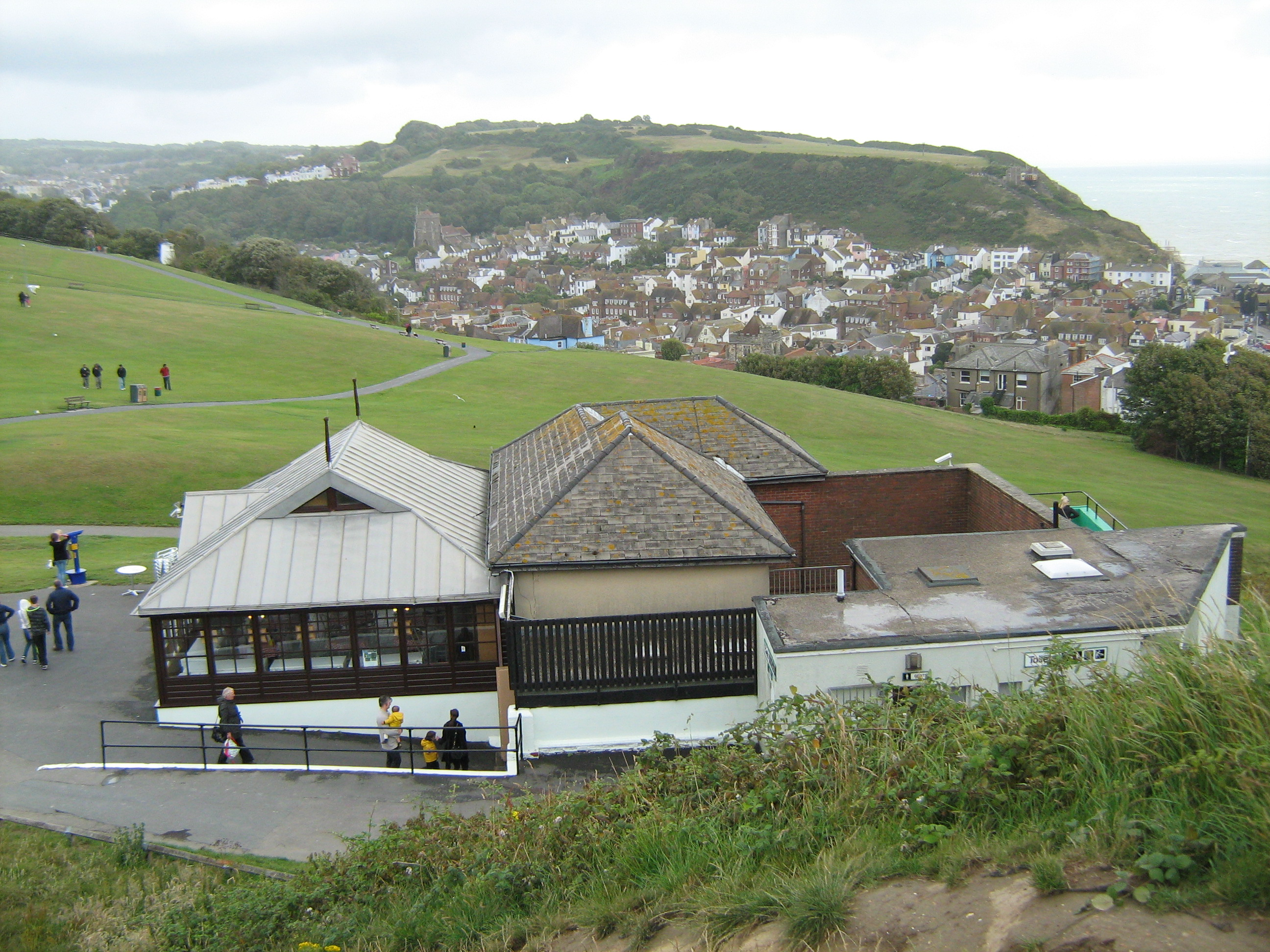
The Top Station

The West Hill Cliff Railway, or West Hill Lift, is a funicular railway located in the English seaside town of Hastings. It runs largely in tunnel, and provides access to Hastings Castle and St Clement's Caves from George Street, on the town's sea front. The West Hill overlooks the sea to the south, the Old Town to the east, and the current central business district of Hastings to the west.

The line is owned and operated by Hastings Borough Council and has the following technical parameters:

- Length: 500 feet (150 m)
- Height difference: 170 feet (52 m)
- Gradient: 33%
- Cars: 2
- Capacity: 16 passengers per car
- Configuration: Double track
- Gauge: 6 ft (1,829 mm)
- Traction: Electricity

Construction of the line was started in 1889 by a private operator, the Hastings Lift Company. The line met with local opposition, which meant that the work took longer to complete than originally envisaged, and construction costs were over 50% higher than envisaged. The line finally opened in 1891, and was originally powered by a gas engine.

The first operator went bankrupt in 1894, probably as a result of the construction delays and cost overrun. The Hastings Passenger Lift Company took over and operated the line until 1947, when Hastings Borough Council bought the line. It was converted from a water balanced system to electric operation in 1971. To mark the railway's centenary year, the line was fully refurbished in 1991.

The West Hill Lift is complemented by the East Hill Cliff Lift, giving visitors access to Hastings Country Park.

== See also ==
- List of funicular railways
