= Sidney Little =

British civil engineer (1885–1961)

Sidney Little, MICE (1885–1961) was a British civil engineer. He was born in Carlisle and after working in Ipswich as the Borough Engineer he was appointed in 1926 in Hastings, East Sussex as the Borough and Water Engineer, later including the role of Borough Planning Officer. He worked there for 24 years. During that time, he was responsible for implementing a number of major projects in the town.

== Career ==
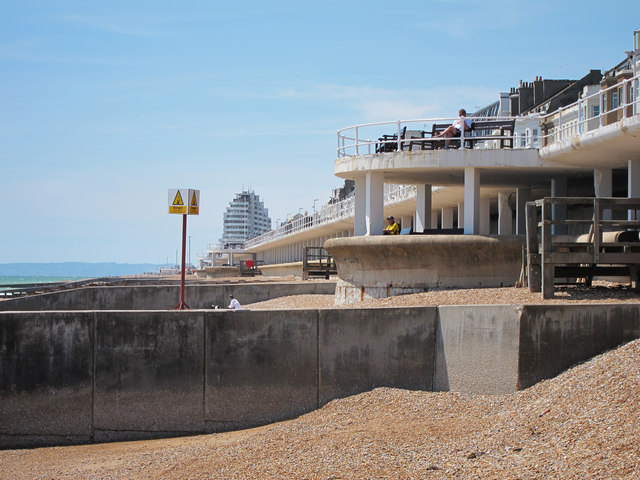
Bottle Alley in Hastings

Known on the South Coast of England as "The Concrete King", Little had great knowledge of reinforced concrete. Many of his projects used this material. Improvements to the "Front Line" sea defences allowed the creation of the UK's first underground car parks. A covered 1,500 feet (460 m) promenade between Hastings Pier and Warrior Square, completed in April 1934 as part of the town's sea defences, was built using concrete panels containing thousands of coloured glass fragments for decoration. This became known locally as "Bottle Alley".

Other concrete projects included the construction of a large open air bathing pool at West St Leonard's with a set of double decker seaside chalets in concrete. The White Rock Baths were reconstructed along with several other municipal projects such as the conversion of Johns Place into a museum and plans for an aerodrome at Pebsham near St Leonards-on-Sea.

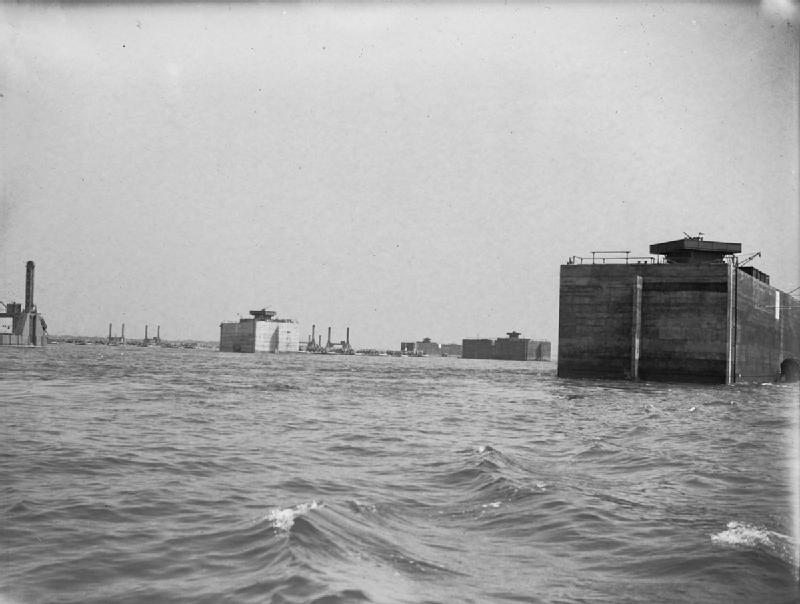
Components (Phoenix caissons) for a Mulberry Harbour floating off Selsey Bill in May 1944

Little was unpopular with some people because of his willingness to remove historic buildings for road creation schemes, but his most important work was with the water supply to the town of Hastings and St Leonard's with the construction of deep tunneled aqueducts up to 200 ft deep and the construction of Powdermill, Darwell and Baldslow reservoirs to supply water. Little also contributed to the improvement and provision of sewers throughout Hastings.

Between 1940 and 1944, Little's expertise was used by the Ministry of Defence when he worked with the Admiralty on the creation of huge concrete Mulberry Harbour sections that were used for the invasion of Normandy. He designed aboveground sea front shelters constructed from reinforced concrete. The structures were towed to France and linked to form harbour walls. They helped the Allies to take ashore large numbers of vehicles, personnel, communications equipment and other supplies – vital to sustaining the frontline forces as they pushed deeper into German territory.

Little was granted the freedom of the Borough of Hastings in 1960, and died in 1961 at age 76.
