= Iron industry of Ashdown Forest =

Ashdown Forest formed an important part of the Wealden iron industry that operated from pre-Roman times until the early 18th century. The industry reached its peak in the two periods when the Weald was the main iron-producing region of Britain, namely in the first 200 years of the Roman occupation (1st to 3rd centuries AD) and during Tudor and early Stuart times. Iron-smelting in the former period was based on bloomery technology, while the latter depended for its rapid growth on the blast furnace, when the Ashdown area became the first in England to use this technology.

The Forest was a particularly favourable location for iron production because of the presence of iron-ore in the local geology of sandstone Ashdown Beds and overlying Wadhurst Clay, the availability of large expanses of woodland for the production of charcoal, and deep, steep-sided valleys that had been incised into the relatively soft sandstone which together with locally high rainfall made it practical to dam streams to form lakes to provide water power for furnaces and forges.

== Iron Age and Roman Period ==
When the Romans invaded Britain in AD 43 the Weald already had a well-established tradition of iron-making, using very small, clay bloomery furnaces for iron-smelting. The pre-Roman settlement pattern was one of sparse occupation based on major defended enclosures along the northern edge of the High Weald with smaller enclosures deeper within it, such as the hill-fort at Garden Hill. The association of these smaller enclosures with iron-making and other evidence suggest that Iron Age colonizers saw the Weald primarily as a source of iron.

The Romans also saw the Weald's economic potential for iron-making and with growing markets in south-east England generated by the building of towns, villas and farms the industry grew, achieving high levels of output at its peak. There is evidence in Ashdown Forest of Roman bloomeries at Garden Hill, Pippingford Park and elsewhere. Like other sites in the western Weald, these are thought to have been private, commercial operations set up by entrepreneurs to produce iron goods for nearby civilian markets. This was in contrast to Roman iron production in the eastern Weald, which is thought to have been state-controlled and linked to the needs of the British Fleet, the Classis Britannica, and which may have been an imperial estate.

The transition from Late Iron Age to Roman Era iron production in the Forest, as elsewhere in the Weald, may have been quite smooth. Bloomery production was already well-established and this southern coastal region of Britain had already become Romanised prior to the invasion of AD 43. It has been suggested that the poorly built Roman-era bath building at Garden Hill may indicate continuity of indigenous community and activity, and a desire to indulge in a more Romanised way of life.

Oliver Rackham has highlighted the impact that the Romans' sophisticated woodmanship, including coppicing, which they practised in Italy, would have had on the Wealden forest in supplying the Roman military iron works there. Using Henry Cleere's estimates that the output of one Roman ironworks in the Weald would be 550 tonnes a year for 120 years, Rackham calculates that it could have been sustained permanently by the charcoal produced by 23,000 acres of coppice wood. He points out that there were many Roman ironworks in the Weald (at least 113 ironworking sites in the Weald have been dated to the Roman period, though of these 20 or less very big sites accounted for the majority of production); clearly, in this respect alone, the Wealden forest the Saxons found was not a virgin forest, but one already affected by human activity.

The trunk road between London and Lewes, partly metalled with iron slag from local bloomeries, would have served to carry the Forest's iron products to the Roman province's pre-eminent mercantile centre at London, and the densely populated agricultural areas of the South Downs and the coastal plain around Chichester. It is likely that the iron goods transported to London and elsewhere took the form of semi-finished products; these would then have been worked into finished products for onward distribution, including overseas.

Although the Roman iron industry flourished from the invasion to the mid 3rd century, it then declined until there was very little activity at all during the 4th century.

== Saxon Period ==
During the period between the departure of the Romans in the early 5th century AD and the Norman Conquest iron-making in the forest - as in the Weald as a whole - seems to have taken place on only a very small scale, judging from the lack of material evidence. A primitive Middle Saxon iron-smelting furnace at Millbrook, near Nutley, which operated in the 9th century, is the only furnace from the Saxon period to have been found in the entire Weald.

== Tudor and Stuart Period ==
The local iron industry underwent a massive resurgence in Tudor and early Stuart times as a result of the introduction of the blast furnace from northern France. Blast furnaces were much larger and more permanent structures than bloomeries, and produced much greater quantities of iron. They correspondingly made much greater demands on local resources, in particular wood, iron ore and water (to operate the bellows and forges in what was now a two-stage smelting and forging process). Because of the huge demand for water, they were generally located in deep valleys where streams could be dammed to provide a sufficient, consistent flow. Such resources were things that Ashdown Forest and the surrounding area possessed in abundance.

Ashdown Forest became the site of Britain's second blast furnace when the works at Newbridge, south of Coleman's Hatch at the foot of Kidd's Hill, began operation in 1496. (Britain's earliest known blast furnace, a few miles away at Queenstock, Buxted, began operation at the end of 1490). The Newbridge furnace, constructed at the commission of Henry VII for the production of heavy metalwork for gun carriages for his war against the Scots, was designed and initially run by French immigrants. The Crown's involvement with Newbridge continued until a replacement, larger furnace was built in 1539 on the western edge of Ashdown Forest at Stumbles. Other works set up around this time in or near the Forest include a steel forge at Pippingford Park, around 1505, and a furnace and forge at Parrock, Hartfield, in 1513. Unfortunately, there is little visible trace of any of these sites today but it is possible to visit the site of Newbridge furnace, off Kidd's Hill, where there is an information board, and to see a number of identifiable features.

The industry grew very rapidly in Ashdown Forest and elsewhere in the High Weald during the 16th century. The area became particularly noted for the casting of cannons for the British navy. The iron-master and gun founder Ralph Hogge, who in 1543 had cast the first iron cannon in England at Buxted, drew his raw materials from the southern part of the forest. The rapid expansion of the iron industry and its huge demand for raw materials, particularly the cutting of trees for making charcoal, is likely to have had a major early impact on Ashdown Forest by depleting its woodlands, although it is likely that in due course production of wood through coppice management, in common with the practice generally in the High Weald, will have been required to ensure a more sustainable supply.

The industry declined in the 17th century as a result of competition from lower-cost and higher productivity iron-producing areas in England and overseas, particularly Sweden.

== Bibliography ==
- Cleere, Henry (1978). Roman Sussex—The Weald. In Drewett (1978), pp. 59–63.
- Drewett, Peter, ed. (1978). Archaeology in Sussex to AD 1500. London: Council for British Archaeology, Research Report 29.
- Hodgkinson, Jeremy (2008). The Wealden Iron Industry. Stroud: The History Press. ISBN 978-0-7524-4573-1.
- Leslie, Kim; Short, Brian (1999). An Historical Atlas of Sussex. Chichester: Phillimore & Co Ltd. ISBN 1-86077-112-2.
- Rackham, Oliver (1997). The Illustrated History of the Countryside. London: Orion Publishing Group. ISBN 1-85799-953-3.
- Tebbutt, C.F. (1982). "A Middle-Saxon Iron Smelting Site at Millbrook, Ashdown Forest, Sussex". Sussex Archaeological Collections. 120: 19–35. doi:10.5284/1085544.
