= St. Clements Caves =

Partlally natural, partly man-made sandstone caves in Hastings, East Sussex

Coordinates: 50.858°N 0.590°E

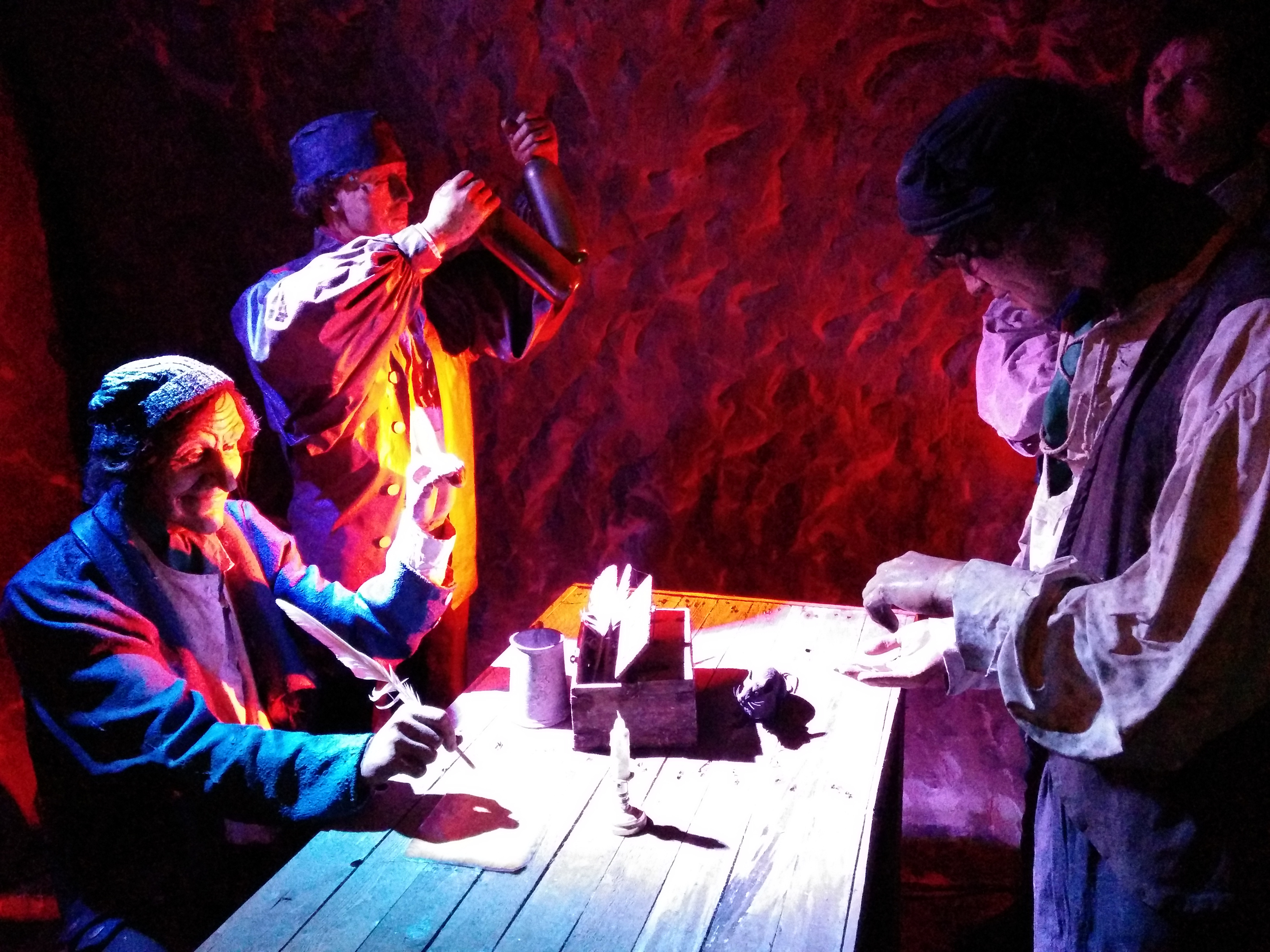
A tableau at the Smugglers Adventure

St Clements Caves are show caves located on the West Hill in Hastings, East Sussex. The caves were named after a nearby parish church and since 1989 are home to the "Smugglers Adventure" tourist attraction which tells the story of smuggling on the South Coast of England 200 years ago.

== History ==
The earliest written reference about the caves was about an old man and woman who were discharged from the town workhouse for misbehaviour and who lived in the mysterious caves from 1783. The couple lived at the bottom of the 'Monks Walk', a 140 feet (44 metres) long tunnel which is now the start of the caves tour.

In the 1820s, the caves were rediscovered by a local grocer named Joseph Golding. He was cutting a garden seat into the side of the cliff for his boss when he broke through to the vast cavern. They became a tourist attraction in 1864 and were visited by the Prince and Princess of Wales. In 1873 the caves received another royal visit from Prince Albert and Prince George Frederick.

During the Second World War the caves became an air raid shelter and a temporary home, originally for 200-400 people and then, for up to 900 people as the war drew on. Even once when the West Hill received a direct hit from a bomb, the caves remained undamaged.

== Modern tourist attraction ==
On 25 March 1989 St Clements Caves reopened as the Smugglers Adventure, a centre for the history of smuggling on the south coast of England. The Smugglers Adventure features attractions displaying life size statues of smugglers and pirates from the 18th century in the St Clements Caves. The Ballroom is now a converted gift shop and the main entrance to the attraction.

In June 1998 the attraction reopened after a major refit, which introduced fictional smuggler 'Hairy Jack' who guides visitors round the caves, along with new displays, hands-on features and interactive activities.

In February 2012 the Smugglers Adventure reopened after another set of major renovations, which included the installation of a brand new audio-visual infrastructure, and of new lighting systems to highlight the caves’ extraordinary architecture and natural geological formations.

There is also a time capsule buried in a wall of the caves which was placed there in 1966 (the 900th anniversary year of the Battle of Hastings) and is due to be opened in 2066.
