= Spaniard (disambiguation) =

Spaniards, or Spanish people, are the people of the country of Spain.

Spaniard(s) may also refer to:

== Arts and entertainment ==
- The Spaniard (film), a lost 1925 American silent film
- Spaniards (band), a 1980s Australian band
- "Spaniard", a song by the Boo Radleys from Everything's Alright Forever, 1992
- "Spaniard", a nickname given to Maximus Decimus Meridius in the 2000 film Gladiator
- "The Spaniard", a character from the 2011 film Pirates of the Caribbean: On Stranger Tides
- "The Spaniards", a song by Billy Corgan (recording as William Patrick Corgan) from Ogilala, 2017

== Places ==
- Spaniard's Bay, a town in Newfoundland and Labrador, Canada
- Spaniard's Bay (bay), a bay in Newfoundland and Labrador, Canada
- Spaniard Knob, two elevations in Towns County, Georgia, US

== Other uses ==
- Aciphylla colensoi or Spaniard, a plant of New Zealand
- The Spaniard (foaled 1962), a Thoroughbred gelding racehorse
- Spaniards Inn, a historic pub in London, England, UK

== See also ==
- Spaniards Mount, a house designed by Adrian Gilbert Scott, in Hampstead Garden Suburb, London, UK
