= Parabolic arch =

Type of arch shape

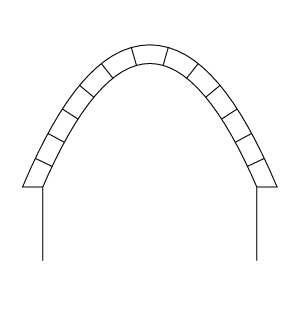

A parabolic arch is an arch in the shape of a parabola. In structures, their curve represents an efficient method of load, and so can be found in bridges and in architecture in a variety of forms.

== Description ==
=== The mathematics ===
While a parabolic arch may resemble a catenary arch, a parabola is a quadratic function while a catenary is the hyperbolic cosine, cosh(x), a sum of two exponential functions. One parabola is f(x) = x^{2} + 3x − 1, and hyperbolic cosine is cosh(x) = (e^{x} + e^{−x})/2. The curves are unrelated.

=== The line of thrust ===
Unlike a catenary arch, the parabolic arch employs the principle that when weight is uniformly applied above, the internal compression (see line of thrust) resulting from that weight will follow a parabolic curve. Of all arch types, the parabolic arch produces the most thrust at the base. Also, it can span the widest area. It is commonly used in bridge design, where long spans are needed.

=== Compared to catenary arches ===
When an arch carries a uniformly distributed vertical load, the correct shape is a parabola. When an arch carries only its own weight, the best shape is a catenary.

A catenary, in blue, graphed against a parabola, in red

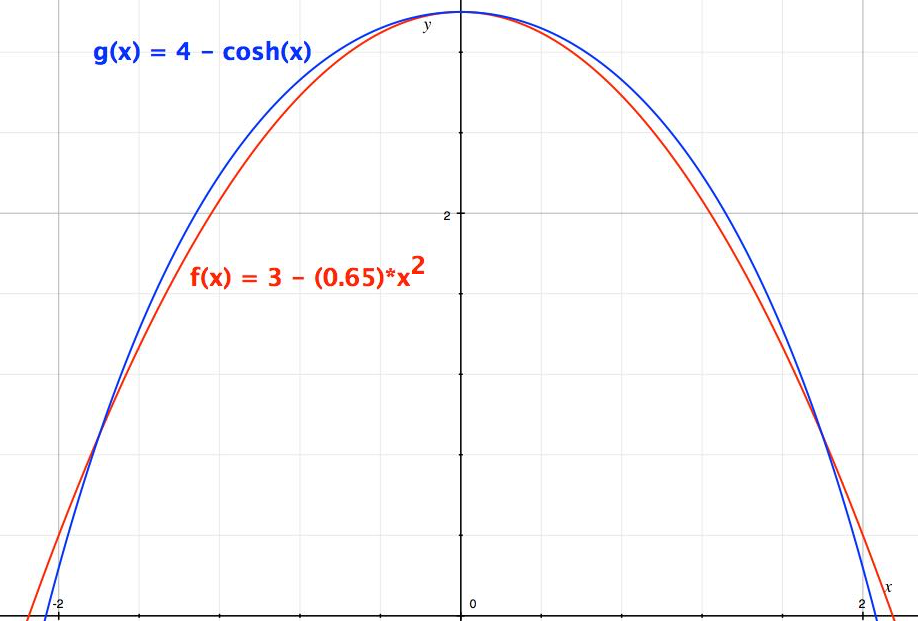
Parabola (red) graphed against a catenary (blue), view to simulate an arch.

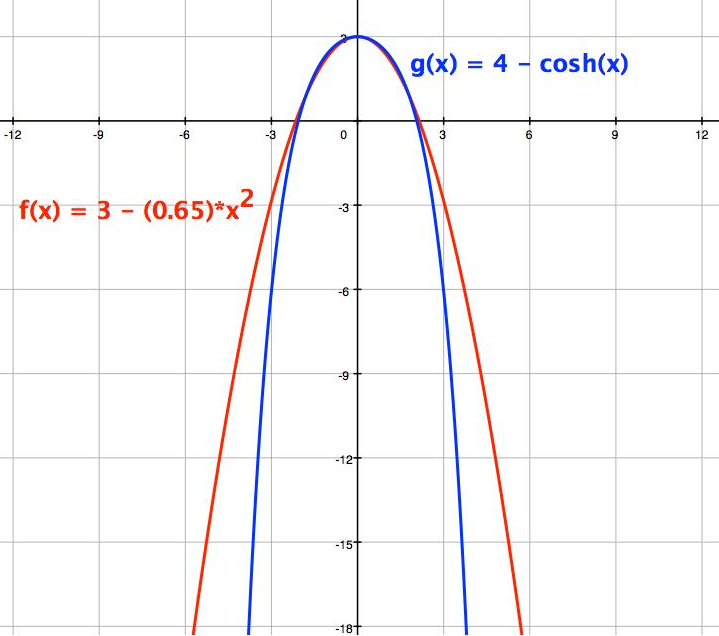
Parabola (red) graphed against a catenary (blue), view to simulate an arch. Zoomed out.

== Uses ==
=== In nature ===
A hen's egg can be fairly well described as two different paraboloids connected by part of an ellipsoid.

=== Architectural examples ===
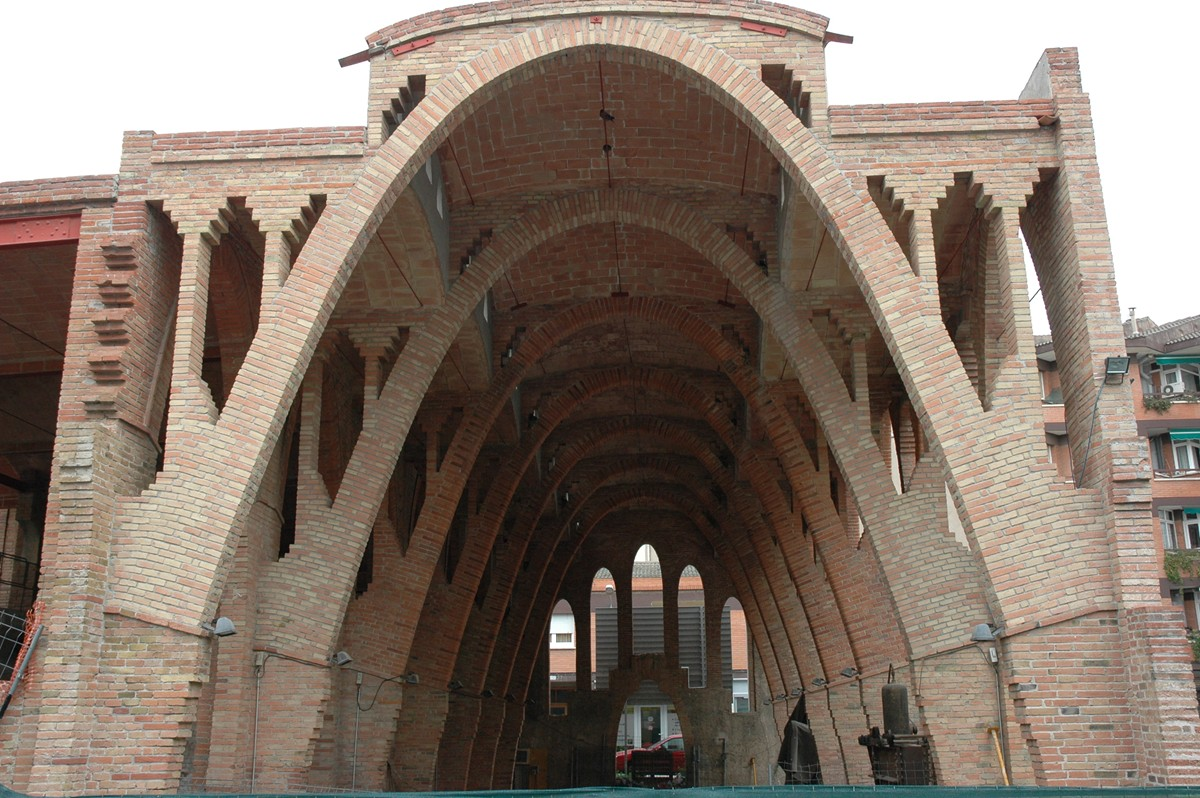
Celler Modernista, Sant Cugat Museum

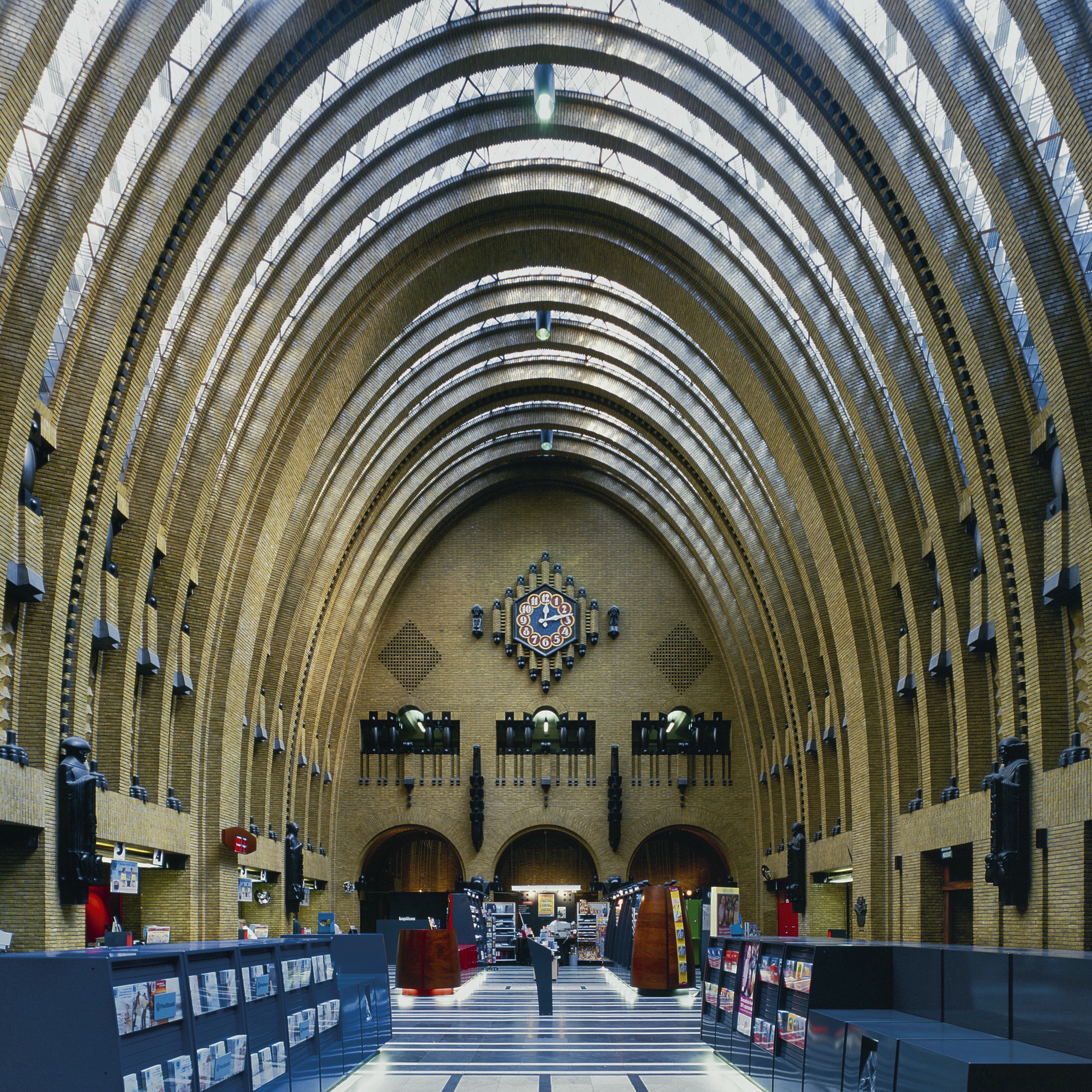
Former main post office, Utrecht

Self-supporting catenary arches appeared occasionally in ancient architecture, for examples in the main arch of the partially ruined Sassanian palace Taq Kasra (now in Iraq), the largest single-span vault of unreinforced brickwork in the world, and the beehive huts of southwestern Ireland. In the modern period, parabolic arches were first used extensively from the 1880s by the Catalan architect Antoni Gaudí, deriving them from catenary arched shapes, constructed of brick or stone, and culminating in the catenary based design of the famous Sagrada Familia. Other Catalan architects then used them into the 1920s, and they appeared occasionally in German expressionist architecture of the 1920s-30s. From the 1940s they gained a new popularity in reinforced concrete, including in shell concrete forms often as hyperbolic parabloids, especially by Felix Candela in Mexico and Oscar Niemeyer in Brazil, but they could be found around the world, especially for churches, in the 1950s and 60s. Since the 1990s Spanish designer Santiago Calatrava has frequently used parabolas for his signature roof structures and bridges. Structures that are self-supporting arches like the Sheffield Winter Garden are often closer to true catenaries.

- Palau Güell, 1886–88, Barcelona, where Antoni Gaudí used parabolic arches in stone for the carriageway entrances, and in brick for the structure of the main hall.
- Casa Milà, 1906, where Gaudi used brick parabolic arches support the attic roof, used as a laundry space.
- Wrocław Market Hall, 1906-8, Richard Plüddemann and Heinrich Küster, internal structure
- Celler modernista, 1921, part of Sant Cugat Museum, Catalonia, Spain, Cèsar Martinell i Brunet
- Pinell de Brai Cooperative Winery, 1922, Pinell de Brai, Catalonia, Spain, Cèsar Martinell i Brunet
- Former main post office, 1919–24, Utrecht, main hall, designed by J. Crouwel Jr.
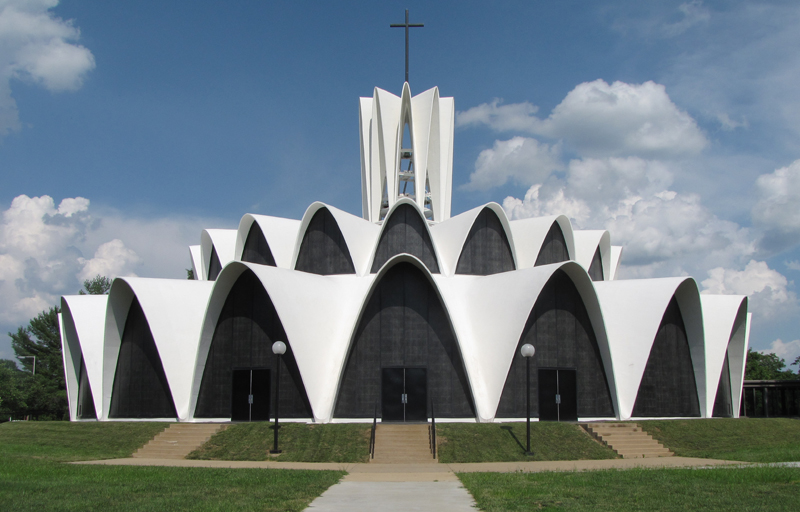
- Priory Chapel, Saint Louis Abbey
  St. Engelbert, Cologne, 1928−1932, by Dominikus Böhm
- Church of Saint Francis of Assisi, 1943, Pampulha, Belo Horizonte, Brazil, Oscar Neimeyer.
- Church of La Purísima, 1943, Monterrey, Mexico, Enrique de la Mora
- Cosmic Rays Pavilion, 1951, Felix Candela with Jorge González Reyna, UNAM, Mexico City
- Memorial Cenotaph, 1952, Hiroshima Peace Memorial Park, Kenzō Tange.
- Church of St Mary and St Joseph, Poplar, 1954, London, United Kingdom, Adrian Gilbert Scott
- St Leonard's Church, 1955, St Leonards on Sea, United Kingdom, Adrian Gilbert Scott
- Dorton Arena 1957, Raleigh
- St Mary's Star of the Sea Cathedral, 1958–62, Darwin, Australia, architect Ian Ferrier
- Toast Rack (building) (originally Domestic Trades College, Manchester Polytechnic) 1960, Fallowfield, Manchester, United Kingdom, city architect, Leonard Cecil Howitt
- Theme Building, 1961, Los Angeles International Airport, Pereira & Luckman Architects, Paul Williams and Welton Becket
- Priory Chapel, Saint Louis Abbey, 1962, Creve Coeur, St. Louis, Missouri, United States, Hellmuth, Obata and Kassabaum (HOK), with Pier Luigi Nervi
- Allen Lambert Galleria, 1992, Toronto, Canada, Santiago Calatrava
- L'Umbracle (catenary shade house) 2001, Ciutat de les Arts i les Ciències (City of Arts and Sciences), Valencia, Spain, Santiago Calatrava
- L'Oceanogràfic aquarium, 2003, Valencia, Spain, Felix Candela.
- Sheffield Winter Garden (catenary), 2003, Sheffield, UK, Pringle Richards Sharratt Architects and Buro Happold
- Fjordenhus, 2018, Vejle Fjord, Denmark, Olafur Eliasson and Sebastian Behmann

=== Bridges ===
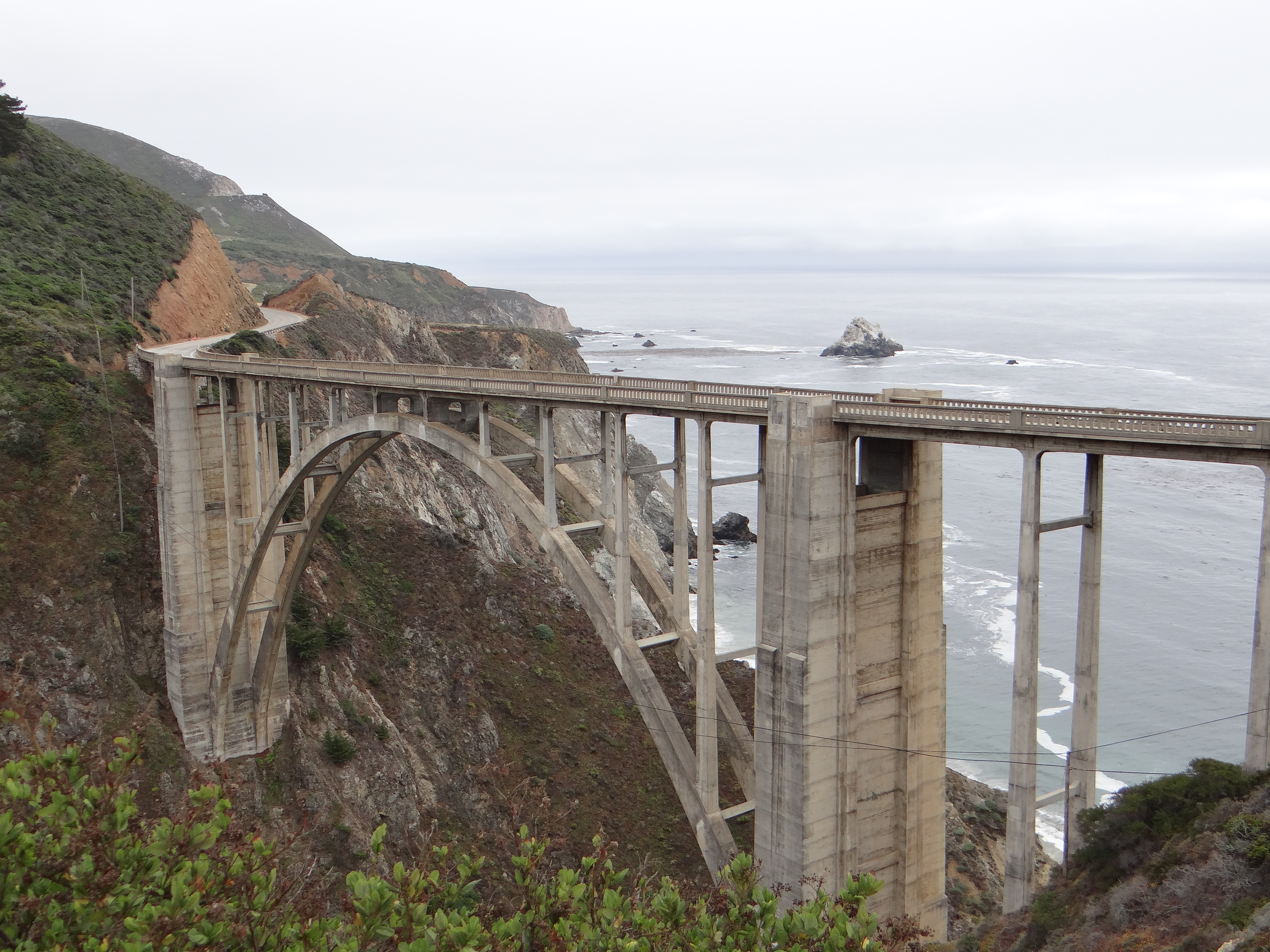
The Bixby Creek Bridge's parabolic arch

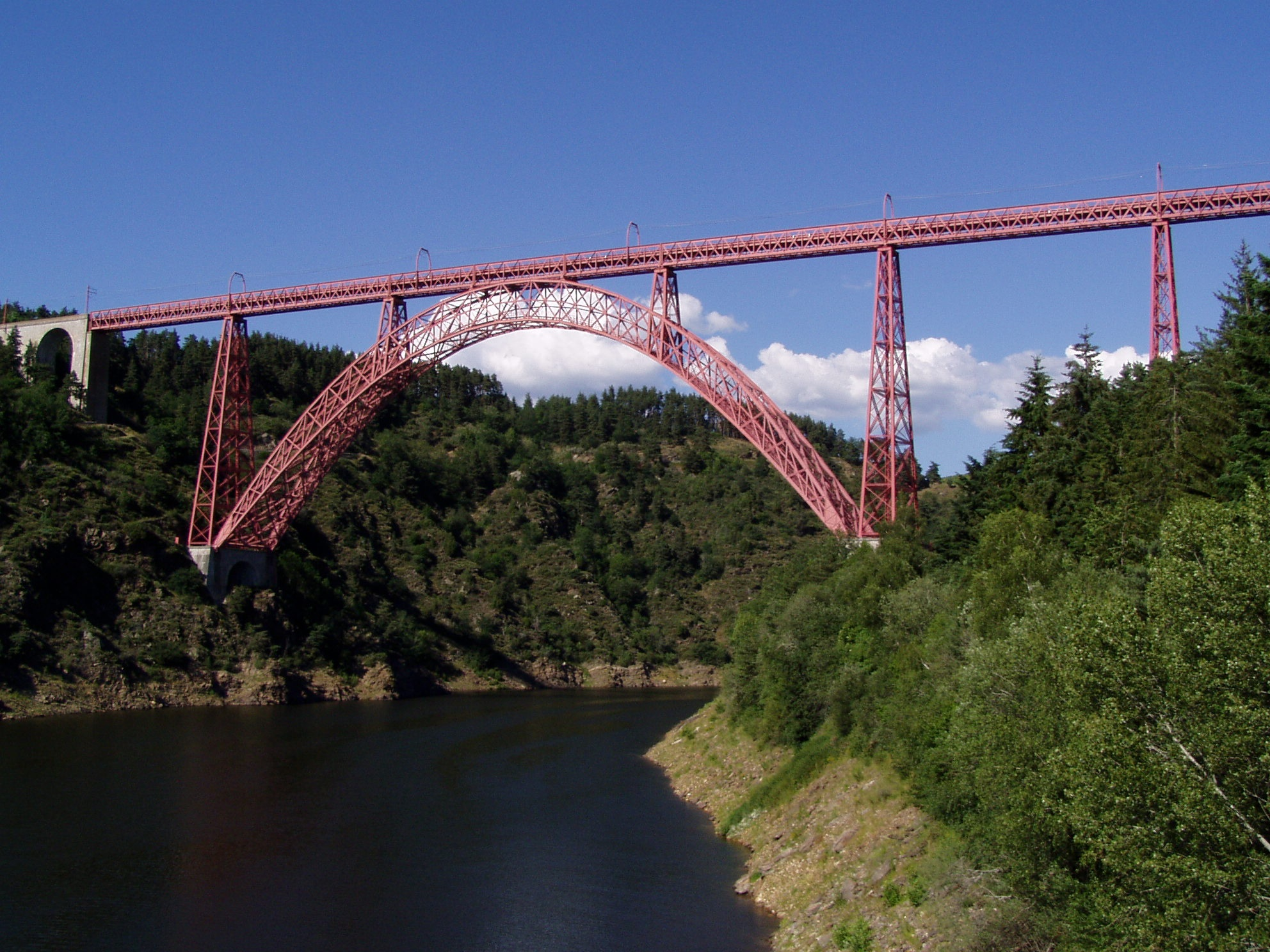
Garabit viaduct, France

Bridges have used a variety of arches since ancient times, sometimes in very flat segmental arched forms but rarely in the form of a parabola. A simple hanging rope bridge describes a catenary, but if they were in the form of a suspension bridges they usually describe a parabola in shape, with the roadway hanging from the inverted arch. Modern suspension bridges were built from the early 19th century, beginning with chains and progressing to more and more elegant steel rope examples, and are still in use today. Parabolic arches that support the roadway from below (or in the form of a through arch) first appeared in the 1870s, and have been used occasionally ever since; examples include:

- Maria Pia Bridge, Gustave Eiffel and Théophile Seyrig, Porto, Portugal, a railway bridge built in 1877.
- Garabit viaduct, near Ruynes-en-Margeride, Cantal, France, designed by Gustave Eiffel, and built between 1882 and 1884.
- Dell Bridge (footbridge), 1894, Port Sunlight, Wirral, England.
- Puente Nuevo, 1903, Murcia, Spain, civil engineer José María Ortiz
- Viaduc d'Austerlitz, 1903-4, Paris, engineers Louis Biette and Fulgence Bienvenüe, architect Jean-Camille Formigé
- 16th Street Bridge, 1905-10, Washington DC, the first parabolic arched bridge in the US.
- Victoria Falls Bridge, 1904-5, Victoria Falls, Zimbabwe
- Memorial Bridge, 1920, Springfield, Massachusetts
- Tyne Bridge, 1928, Newcastle upon Tyne, UK.
- Cape Creek Bridge, 1931, Lane County, Oregon, United States, engineer Conde McCullough
- Bayonne Bridge, 1931, Bayonne, New Jersey, Othmar Ammann and architect Cass Gilbert
- Bixby Creek Bridge, 1931-2, Big Sur, California, highway engineer C. H. Purcell and engineer F. W. Panhorst
- Balclutha Road Bridge, 1933-35, Balclutha, South Otago, New Zealand
- Juscelino Kubitschek Bridge, 2002, Brasilia, Brazil, Alexandre Chan and structural engineer Mário Vila Verde

== See also ==
- Arch bridge
- Catenary arch
- Catenoid
- Dome
- Gothic arch
- Gothic architecture
- Lancet arch
- Lancet window
- Mathematics and architecture
- Musgum mud huts
- Nubian vault
- Overhead line
- Simple suspension bridge
- Steel catenary riser
- Stressed ribbon bridge
- Suspension bridge
- Truss arch bridge
- Vault (architecture)
- Voussoir

== Bibliography ==
- Gimeno Díaz de Atauri, Jorge; Gutiérrez Andrés, Juan (2001), El Puente de la Pólvora y otros puentes, Murcia: Colegio de Ingenieros de Caminos, Canales y Puentes. Demarcación Murcia, ISBN 978-84-607-3209-9
