= St Leonard's Church, St Leonards-on-Sea =

St Leonard's Church
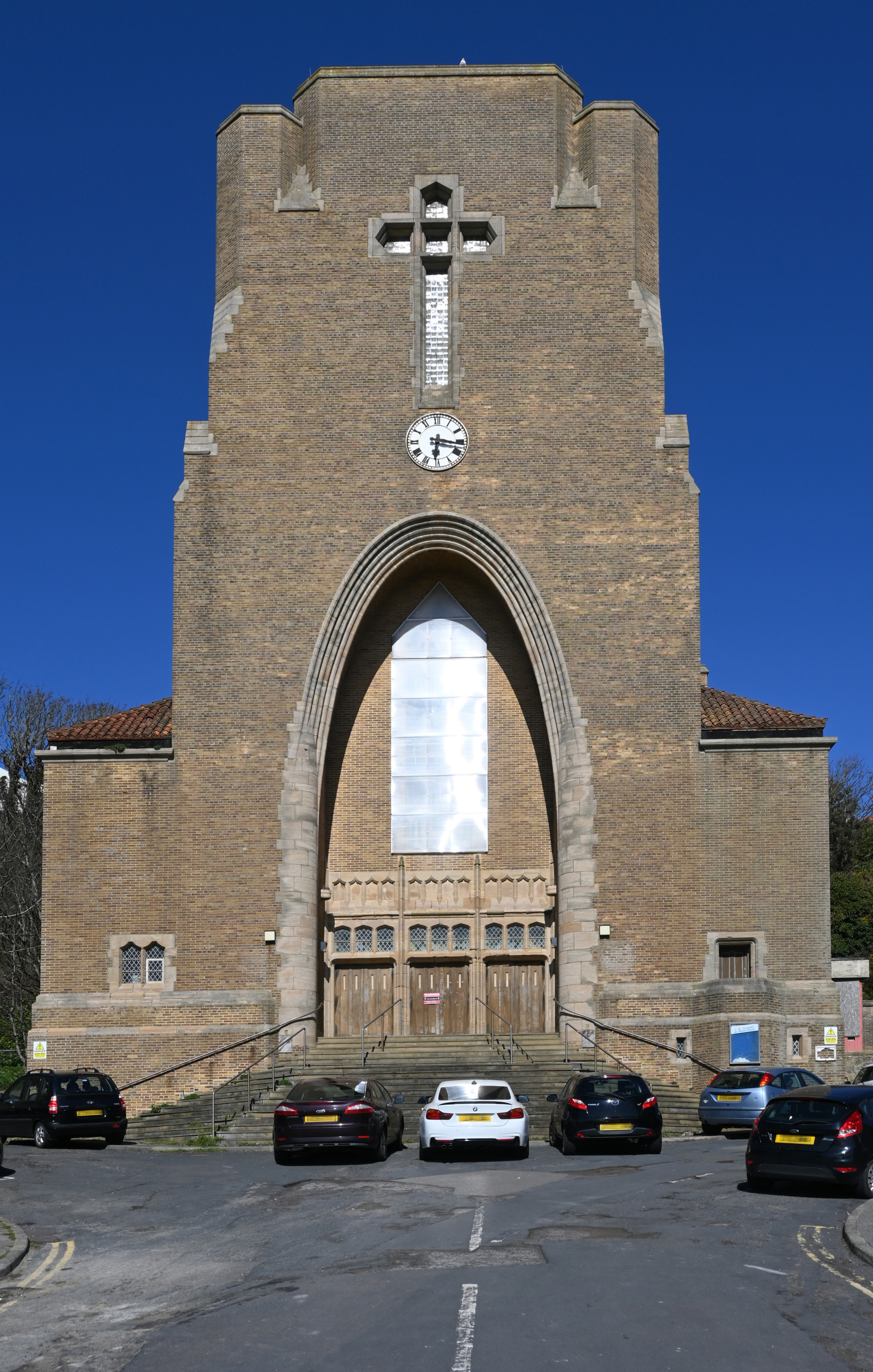
- St Leonard's Church (viewed from Marina) was rebuilt between 1953 and 1961, and functioned as a parish church until 2018.
- St Leonard's Church
- 50.8513°N 0.5514°E
- OS grid reference: TQ 79695 08848
- Location: Undercliff, St Leonards-on-Sea, Hastings, East Sussex TN38 0YW
- Country: England
- Denomination: Church of England

History
- Founded: 8 September 1831
- Founder: James Burton
- Dedication: Leonard of Noblac
- Dedicated: 22 May 1834
- Consecrated: 22 May 1834

Architecture
- Functional status: Closed
- Heritage designation: Grade II
- Designated: 25 September 1998
- Architect(s): James Burton (first church); Giles and Adrian Gilbert Scott (present building)
- Style: Modern Gothic
- Groundbreaking: 1831
- Completed: 1832 (first church); 1961 (present building)

Administration
- Province: Canterbury
- Diocese: Chichester
- Archdeaconry: Lewes and Hastings
- Deanery: Rural Deanery of Hastings
- Parish: St Leonard, St Leonards-on-Sea

St Leonard's Church is an Anglican church in the St Leonards-on-Sea area of Hastings, a town and borough in the English county of East Sussex. The main church serving James Burton's high-class mid 19th-century new town of St Leonards-on-Sea was designed by Burton himself just before his death, and it survived for more than a century despite being damaged by the cliff into which it was built; but one night during World War II, the sea-facing building was obliterated by a direct hit from a damaged V-1 "doodlebug" which had crossed the English Channel. The Gilbert Scott brothers' bold replacement church was ready in 1961, and along with a sister church at nearby Bulverhythe served the parish of St Leonards-on-Sea, covered by the Hastings Archdeaconry. Historic England has listed the building at Grade II for its architectural and historical importance.

== History and architecture ==
=== Founding of St Leonards-on-Sea ===
By the 12th century, Hastings on the English Channel coast was one of Sussex's largest and most important towns. The famous Battle of 1066 took place nearby; a castle was founded; the town operated its own mint; it was the leader of the Cinque Ports; and seven churches existed within its boundaries. The surrounding manors included Gensing, a large and attractive expanse of land running down from a forested valley on to flat agricultural land and a beach immediately west of the town. As Hastings recovered from an 18th-century slump and started to become fashionable and well patronised again in the early 19th century, speculative development was encouraged.

James Burton, a builder and entrepreneur who later fathered the prominent architect Decimus Burton, saw the potential of the Gensing estate land, which was owned by the Eversfield baronets of Denne Park near Horsham, West Sussex. He bought a large section of this manor, including 1,151 yards (1,052 m) of seafront land, for £7,800 in February 1828, and developed a carefully planned new town, St Leonards-on-Sea, on it. Residential, commercial and hotel development was rapid, especially after it was incorporated as a town by an Act of Parliament in 1832 (previously it had been run as a private enterprise by Burton), and the resort soon rivalled neighbouring Hastings in popularity.

The resort took its name from the long vanished St Leonard's Church and its accompanying parish, which still existed in name. The church, on the site of the present Norman Road Methodist Church, was demolished "between 1404 and 1428"—one of several churches lost in the Hastings area in the medieval period. At various times it had belonged to an abbey in Rouen in France and to Harmondsworth Priory in Middlesex. One of Burton's first acts in planning the town was to find a site for a new parish church. Services were originally held in a house, number 36 Marina, and arranged by Burton's wife. In January 1830, Burton announced to the General Quarter Sessions that Anglican worship would take place at the town's Assembly Rooms on a temporary basis. This was followed by a statement that he sought to build a "chapel" and burial ground serving St Leonard's parish and the neighbouring parish of St Mary Magdalene. (This largely undeveloped area of land, east of St Leonard's parish, was named after some almshouses rather than an ancient church.)

=== The first church ===
Burton's chosen site for his church was in the west of the town, on top of the steep West Hill overlooking the town and the English Channel. Friends pointed out that it would be too far to climb, so he found a new site set back from Marina (the seafront road) between some rows of houses. To fit the church in, a large section of cliff had to be dug out. Originally the church was a proprietary chapel, built in accordance with an Act of Parliament; it was not consecrated for public use immediately, and the Bishop of Chichester had to grant temporary permission for public worship to take place. Burton asked Princess Sophia of Gloucester, who happened to be staying in St Leonards-on-Sea, to lay the foundation stone on 8 September 1831. Construction continued until late 1832, and the Bishop of Durham dedicated the church to St Leonard and consecrated it on 22 May 1834. Burton himself was the architect; it was the only church he ever designed.

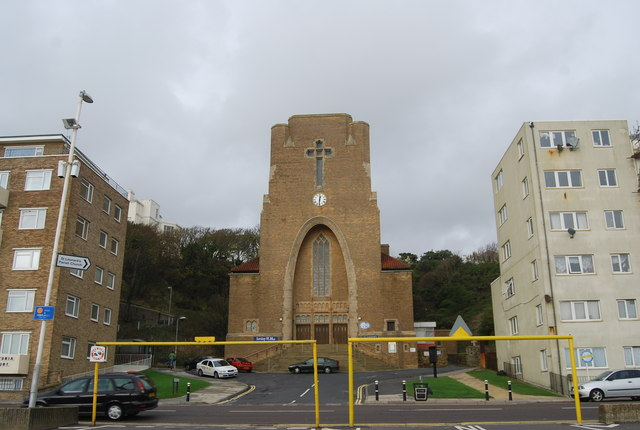
The church was set back from the seafront and built into the cliff behind. The present church (pictured) stands in the same position.

The building, described as "a simple Gothic chapel", faced south towards the English Channel rather than adopting the standard eastward orientation. A stair-turreted bell tower topped with battlements and containing an entrance porch stood at the south end. The porch led to the nave, which lacked aisles but had a chancel arch leading to the chancel. A round window with tracery lit the north end of the church, and the side walls had lancet windows. A photograph dated c. 1910 shows diagonal buttresses to the tower, paired arched openings with louvres at the top of the tower, and pinnacles at the corners of the nave. Built of stone, it was closest in style to 15th-century Perpendicular ("Late") Gothic.

From the beginning, St Leonard's Church was popular and fashionable. Two years before she became Queen, Princess Victoria attended services regularly in 1834–35, and a drawing by John Foulon at that time shows a large flag flying from the tower. A guidebook of 1831 noted that "its situation [under the cliff] will produce a most extraordinary and picturesque effect". The building displeased some people, though, including Sussex writer John Parry: he stated "it is to be regretted that the style and proportions are not on a grander scale – it cannot fairly said to be worthy of [the town]".

The church suffered structural problems almost immediately. In 1837, it was partly crushed when the cliff behind it collapsed: the chancel was destroyed and had to be rebuilt to smaller dimensions. (It originally measured 50 by 108 feet (15 m × 33 m) and had a capacity of 800, of which 320 sittings were free and not subject to pew rents.) The whole church was in danger of destruction, but the reconstruction work saved it. Later that year, the church received its first organ, partly paid for by Queen Adelaide. One source indicates that John Billing "extensively renovated" the church in 1861–62, although he is known to have been undertaking similar work during those years at St Leonard's Church in Seaford, East Sussex. A new parish, consisting of parts of the ancient parishes St Leonard's and St Mary Magdalene's, was created for the church in 1868. Thereafter the church was officially a parish church and had its own rector.

=== Destruction in 1944 ===
When World War II broke out, Hastings and St Leonards-on-Sea were considered vulnerable to attacks and invasion from abroad. They became a "restricted area" in 1940, and substantial defences were built on the seafront and elsewhere. Bombing raids and V-1 flying bombs ("doodlebugs") were experienced frequently. On the night of 29 July 1944, a Saturday, a doodlebug was hit over the English Channel. Damaged, it nevertheless continued to fly towards the coastline of St Leonards-on-Sea. It was approaching Marine Court—a recently built Art Deco block of flats which was hosting a servicemen's party—but it veered and crashed in front of the doors of St Leonard's Church, making a deep crater. The tower fell into this, and the rest of the church was brought down as well. Although there were no casualties, the church was completely destroyed. Although the problem of rock falls and subsidence associated with the cliffs had continued throughout the life of the church, the War Damage Commission would only pay for it to be rebuilt on the same site. The architectural partnership of brothers Giles and Adrian Gilbert Scott were commissioned to design the new building.

=== Reconstruction ===
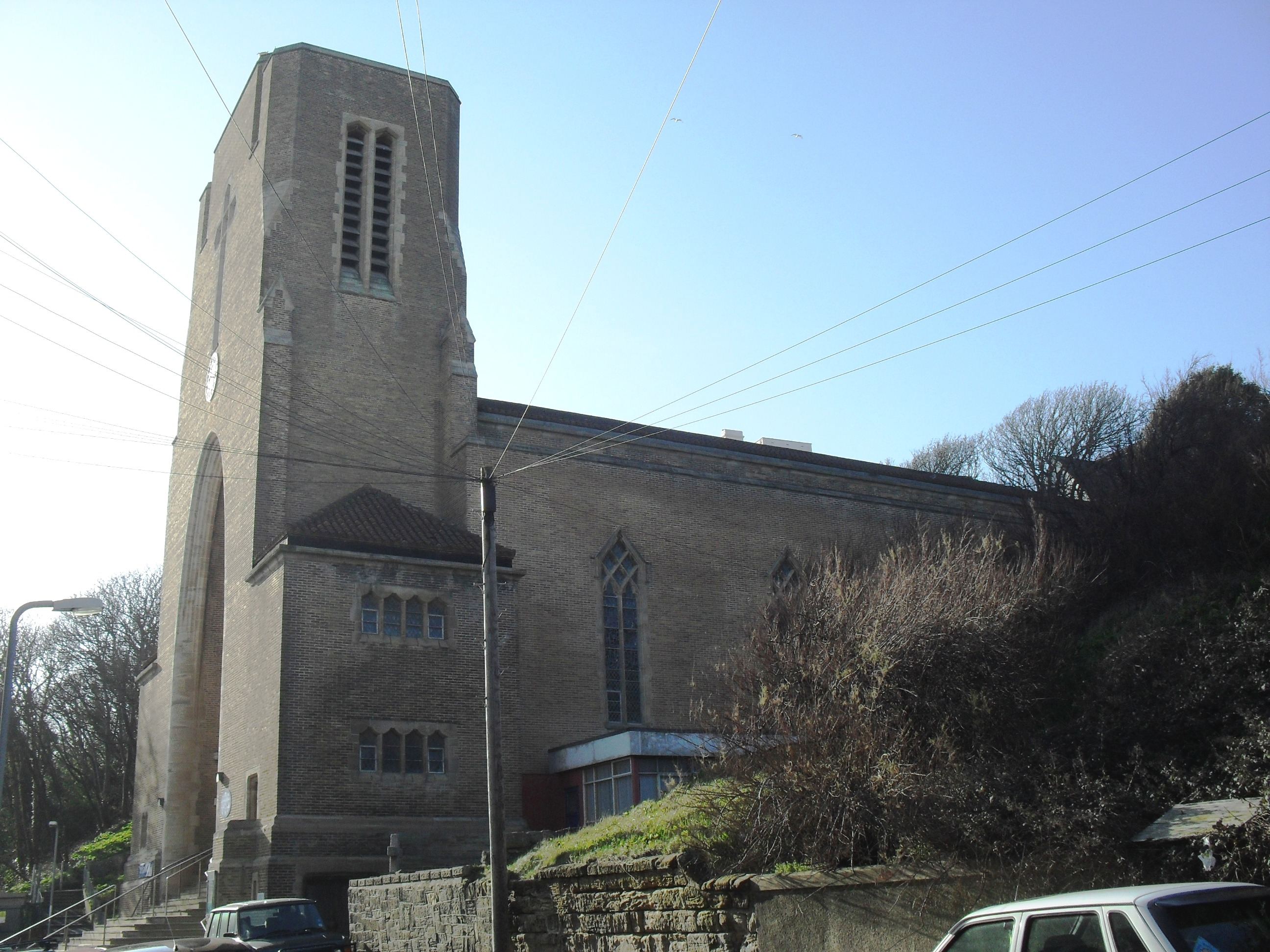
The church is built into the cliff behind.

The Gilbert Scotts already had several postwar churches and unexecuted schemes to their name, individually or jointly. They generally worked in a "simplified modernistic Gothic Revival" style, which was their chosen motif for St Leonard's Church. Giles Gilbert Scott's proposal for the rebuilding of war-damaged Coventry Cathedral (1946–47) and his brother's work on St Mary and St Joseph's Church on the Lansbury Estate in east London (1950–54), both based on a series of parabolic arches, informed their work at St Leonards-on-Sea: the design theme was used both inside and out. Adrian was principally responsible for the design, and construction began in October 1953. The building was ready to be opened for worship in April 1955, although it lacked the intended south tower: this was added in 1960–61 and the church was reopened. Adrian Gilbert Scott was apparently inspired by the unusual sea-facing site (the church is the only one on England's south coast to have a direct, uninterrupted sea view from its entrance): he stated "no architect could wish for a more romantic or inspiring site on which to build a church".

More landslips from the cliff occurred in the 1980s and 1990s, and defences had to be built around the church; in 2000, the building's future was said to be uncertain, and closure was considered. More damage was caused by an electrical fire on Christmas Day 2003.

The church is built of pale buff-coloured brick and cream-coloured stone. The roof over the nave and chancel is shallow with deep eaves and is laid with pantiles. A "fine blocky Gothic tower", elevated above the road and with a staircase in front, dominates the façade; it has a series of parabolic arches forming recesses. These have Perpendicular Gothic mouldings. The church has a simple north–south plan like its predecessor (the Gilbert Scotts changed to this layout after an earlier, more complex plan was considered too expensive). Recessed into the tower are three straight-headed wooden double doors with triple windows above them and a tall, pointed-arched three-light lancet window above. Higher still is a clock and a giant window in the form of a cross, illuminated at night and used as a landmark by vessels in the English Channel.

Inside, the nave has narrow aisles with vaults and internal buttresses, but the dominant feature is another set of parabolic arches which form "a giant arcade" as they lead the eye to the chancel and sanctuary and to the side walls. The walls have greenish-blue stonework set in a wave-like pattern; this motif was also found at the contemporary Lansbury Estate church. Other maritime themes include images of "locally caught skate and herring" as part of the loaves and fishes imagery on the marble floor of the sanctuary—described as a "forceful" allegory. The rector of the church at the time of the bombing, Canon Cuthbert Griffiths, was responsible for the internal decoration: soon after the old church was destroyed he dreamed that Jesus was preaching to the church's congregation from a boat on the Sea of Galilee (Matthew 13). Soon afterwards, he travelled there, and in the village of Ein Gev he bought a boat whose prow had been converted into a pulpit. He arranged for it to be brought back on board a ship to be used in the new church. The Prince Line Shipping Company transported it on a vessel which was making its last voyage; the company presented the boat's binnacle to Canon Griffiths to use as a lectern.

== The church today ==
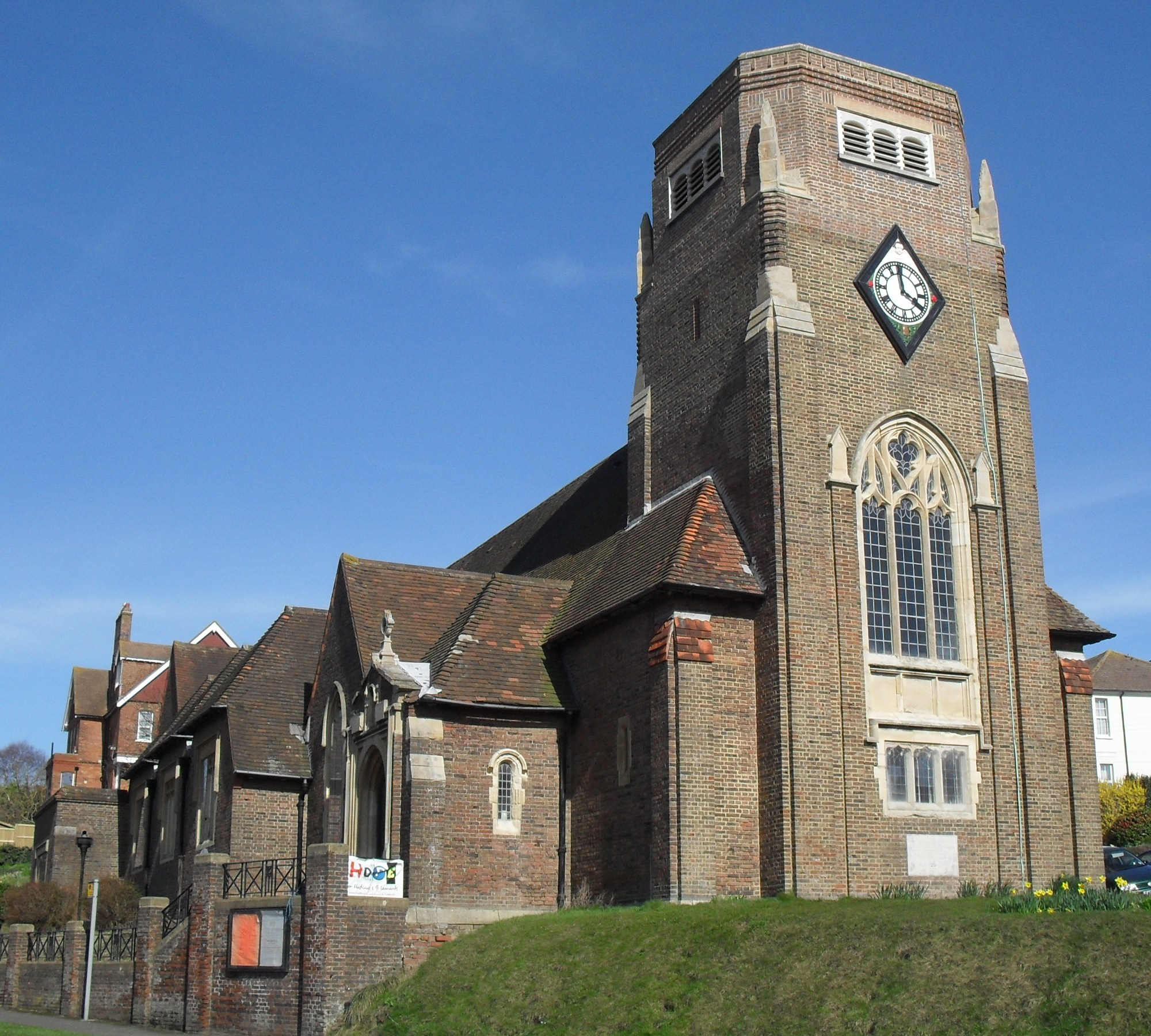
St Ethelburga's Church, now part of the St Leonard's parish, was built in 1929.

St Leonard's Church was listed at Grade II by Historic England on 25 September 1998; this defines it as a "nationally important" building of "special interest". As of February 2001, it was one of 521 Grade II listed buildings, and 535 listed buildings of all grades, in the borough of Hastings. Few postwar buildings have this status: Historic England states that "post-1945 buildings have to be exceptionally important to be listed", as the criteria become stricter the newer a building is.

The church is part of a joint parish and benefice with St Ethelburga's Church in nearby Bulverhythe. This brown-brick building was designed in a simple Gothic Revival style in 1929 by John B. Mendham. A pinnacled Art Deco-style clock tower dominates the exterior. The parish boundaries are the English Channel coast to the south; to the west, Glyne Gap and the western boundary of the borough, almost to the Crowhurst Road; to the northeast, the railway line between Crowhurst and West St Leonards railway stations; then behind West Hill Road, Archery Road, Quarry Hill, Kenilworth Road and Gensing Road. The parish was reunited in 2009, 80 years after it was originally split to allow St Ethelburga's to become a separate parish church. The parish boundary had been Grosvenor Gardens. The advowson (patronage) is held by the Hyndman's Trustees, based in Sheffield.

Owing to structural issues, the church was officially closed for worship in 2018.

== See also ==
- List of places of worship in Hastings
