= Bexhill West railway station =

Disused railway station in Rother, East Sussex

Coordinates: 50.840871°N 0.463369°E

Bexhill West
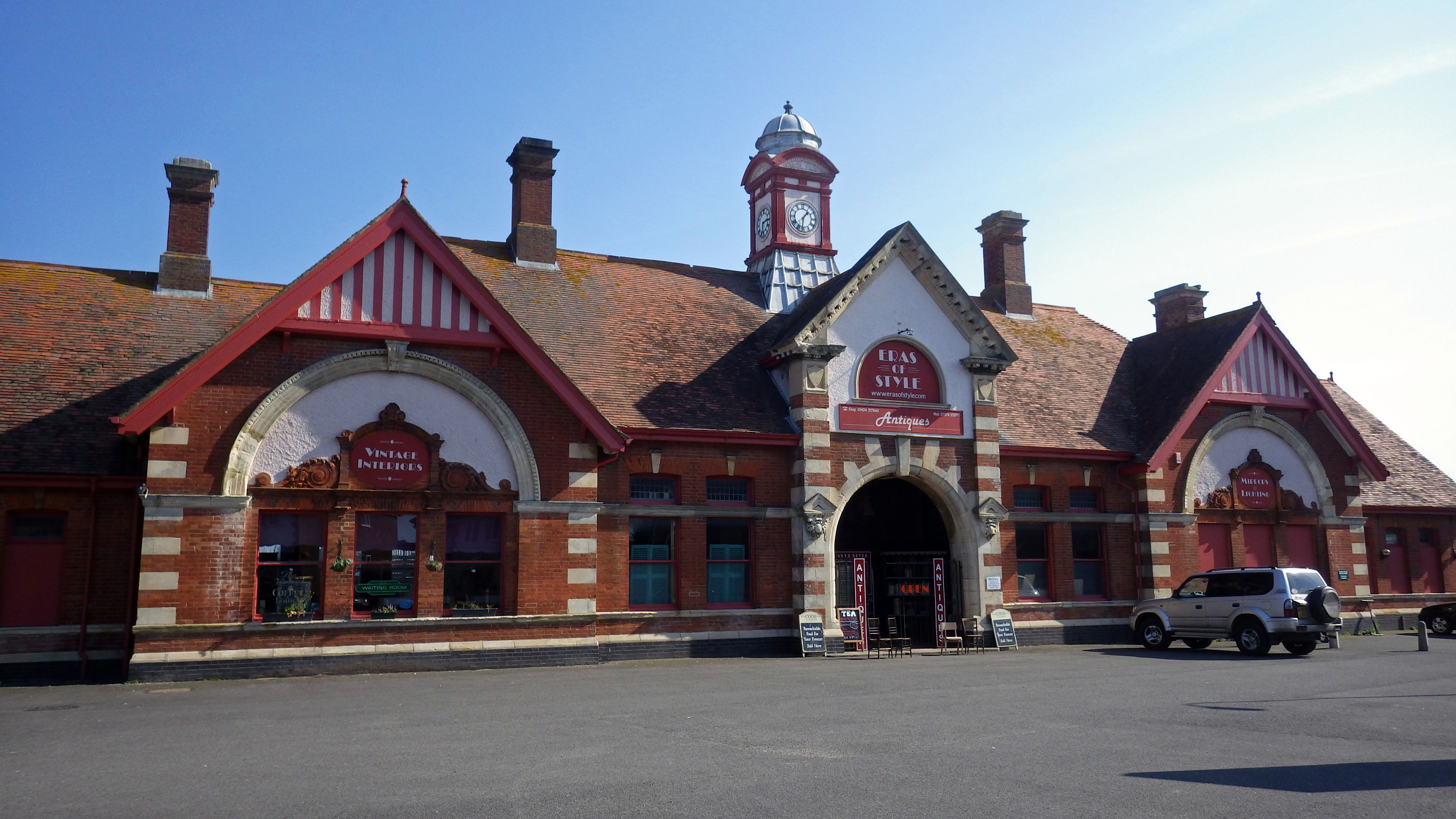

General information
- Location: Bexhill-on-Sea, Rother, East Sussex; England
- Grid reference: TQ736076
- Platforms: 3

Other information
- Status: Disused

History
- Original company: Crowhurst, Sidley and Bexhill Railway
- Pre-grouping: South Eastern and Chatham Railway
- Post-grouping: Southern Railway; Southern Region of British Railways

Key dates
- 1 June 1902: Opened as Bexhill
- 1 January 1917: Closed
- 1 March 1919: Reopened
- 1920: Renamed Bexhill-on-Sea
- 9 July 1923: Renamed Bexhill (Eastern)
- November 1929: Renamed Bexhill West
- 9 September 1963: Goods facilities withdrawn
- 15 June 1964: Closed to passengers
Location

Bexhill West is a closed station in Bexhill-on-Sea in East Sussex. It was the terminus of the Bexhill West branch of the Hastings Line. It was opened by the South Eastern and Chatham Railway and was operated by the Southern Region of British Railways on closing. The station building still survives as an antiques house. The trackbed and site of the demolished platforms are now occupied by commercial industrial buildings.

== History ==
A 4 1/2-mile (7.2 km) branch line was ceremonially opened between Crowhurst and Bexhill on 31 May 1902 by the nominally independent Crowhurst, Sidley & Bexhill Railway Company which had been promoted by the Earl De La Warr together with other local businessmen and landowners. The line had the backing of the South Eastern Railway which ran services to the nearby Hastings and St Leonards stations. The branch would offer a quicker route to Bexhill than that already provided by the London, Brighton and South Coast Railway whose own Bexhill station on the Hastings to Brighton line had opened more than fifty years earlier. The new Bexhill terminus would be 62 miles (100 km) from Charing Cross, while the LB&SCR's station was 71 3/4 miles (115.5 km) from Victoria. The branch was absorbed by the South Eastern and Chatham Railway in 1905.

The new Bexhill station was situated in a valley on the west side of Bexhill which had not yet been developed. It was approached by a new road named "Terminus Road" to distinguish it from the "Station Road" which served the LB&SCR's station. A lavish station building was constructed which reflected the SER's ambitions for the line. Designed by C.S. Barry and C.E. Mercer, it was built of yellow and red brick and Bath Stone dressing. Welsh slate was used on the roof which is crowned by a clocktower, and the main entrance features a block-moulded pediment which was carved in situ. The symmetrical building comprised a large and airy booking hall, ticket and parcels offices, a waiting room and ladies toilet, as well as the stationmaster's and inspector's offices. At a right angle to the building stands a smaller block which contained a refreshment room, gents' toilet, porters' and lamp rooms. Two 700-foot-long (210 m) and 30-foot-wide (9.1 m) island platforms were provided, those to the east (nos. 1 and 2) covered by a glass canopy extending to a distance of 400 feet (120 m) and also covering the concourse between the tracks and building. The uncovered platforms 3 and 4 were rarely used; platform 4 never in fact received any track and platform 3 was soon covered by grass. The station buildings were lit by electricity, whereas the platforms by gas. A goods depot was opened on London Road opposite the York Hotel, where a brick shed measuring 133 feet 6 inches (40.69 m) by 30 feet (9.1 m) was erected.

Despite the shorter route to London and the impressive station buildings, passengers continued to prefer the LB&SCR's more centrally located station. In 1917, the Railway Executive Committee ordered the closure of the branch from January 1917. Although goods services began again from November 1917, full passenger services were not restored until March 1919. The 1923 grouping led to the SE&CR becoming part of the Southern Railway which renamed the LB&SCR station "Bexhill Central" whilst the SER's station became simply "Bexhill" and finally "Bexhill West" in November 1929. A Southern Railway platform sign (“Bexhill West”) is on display at the Bexhill Museum. The Southern arranged for most main line services through Crowhurst to include three corridor coaches for Bexhill West to avoid the need to change trains, but this still failed to tempt passengers on to the branch. In 1930, consultants engaged by Bexhill Town Council recommended the construction of a link line between the two lines, but nothing came of this nor of the proposal in 1937 to electrify the line at the same time as the Hastings Line. Although now very much referred to as a branch, the line temporarily took on main line status when services on the Hastings Line were temporarily diverted to Bexhill West between 27 November 1949 and 5 June 1950 while Bo-peep tunnel was closed for partial reconstruction. Emergency bus services ran from Crowhurst to St Leonards, Hastings and Bexhill West. Services on the East Coastway Line terminated at St Leonards West Marina. The line's push-pull trains were replaced in June 1958 by two-car diesel-electric units which connected with the London to Hastings diesel-electric units at Crowhurst. Sunday services were withdrawn from January 1960. The line's demise was confirmed by its inclusion in the Beeching Report, and it finally closed to all traffic from 15 June 1964.

Preceding station	Disused railways	Following station
Terminus	British Rail; Southern Region; Bexhill West Branch Line	Sidley

== Present day ==
The track was lifted in 1965 and the bridge over Down Road and Little Common Road demolished in 1967. Bexhill West station building has survived and is now occupied by Sivyers Antique Emporium and Auction, along with Brief Encounters Cafe. The adjoining former refreshment rooms are now a pub and restaurant, and the engine shed forms part of the light industrial estate now occupying the former trackbed to the rear of the station along Beeching Road. The platforms have been demolished.

The building was listed at Grade II by English Heritage on 27 February 2013. This status is given to "nationally important buildings of special interest".

== Photographs ==
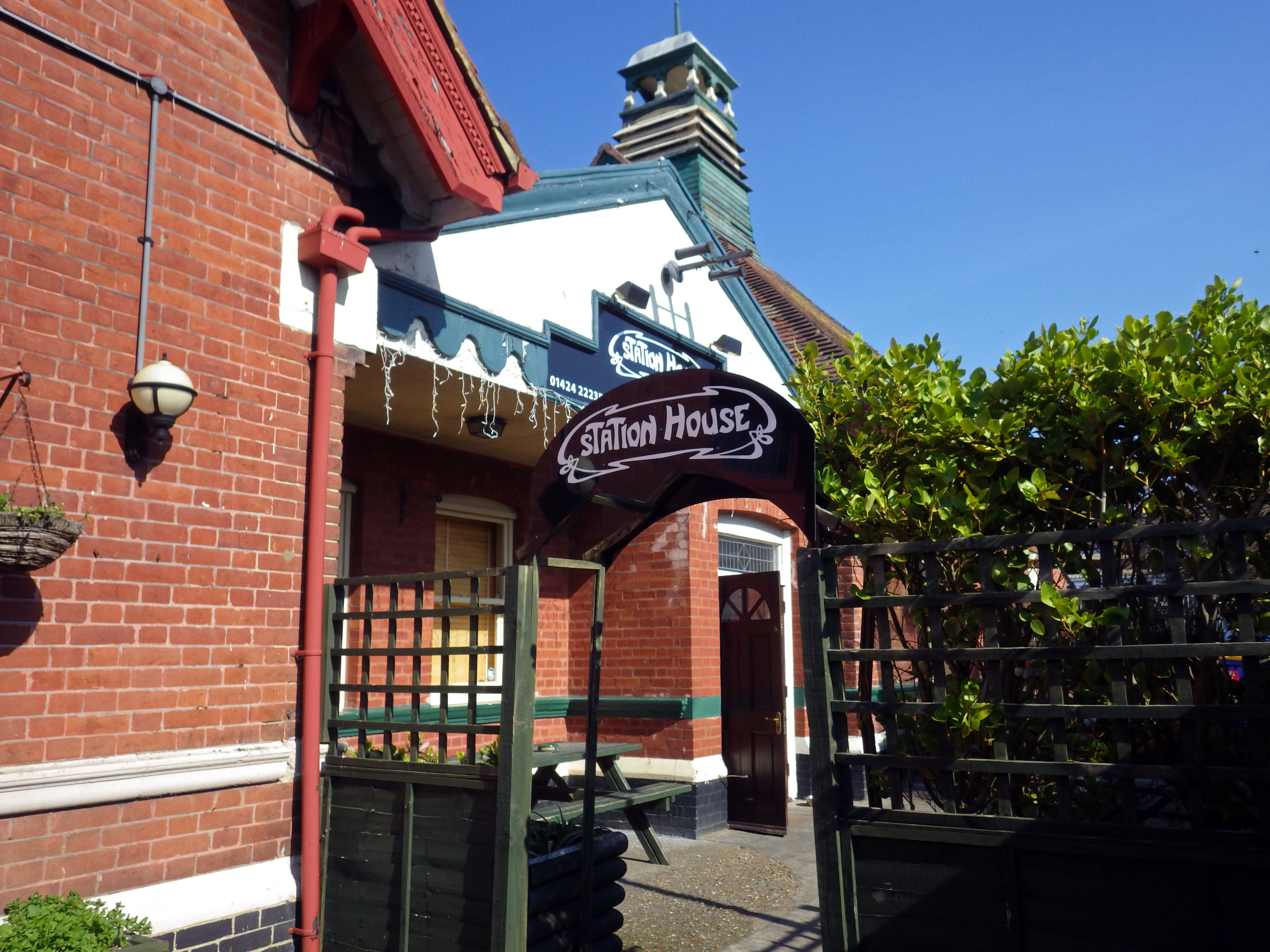
Former refreshment rooms, now a pub/restaurant.

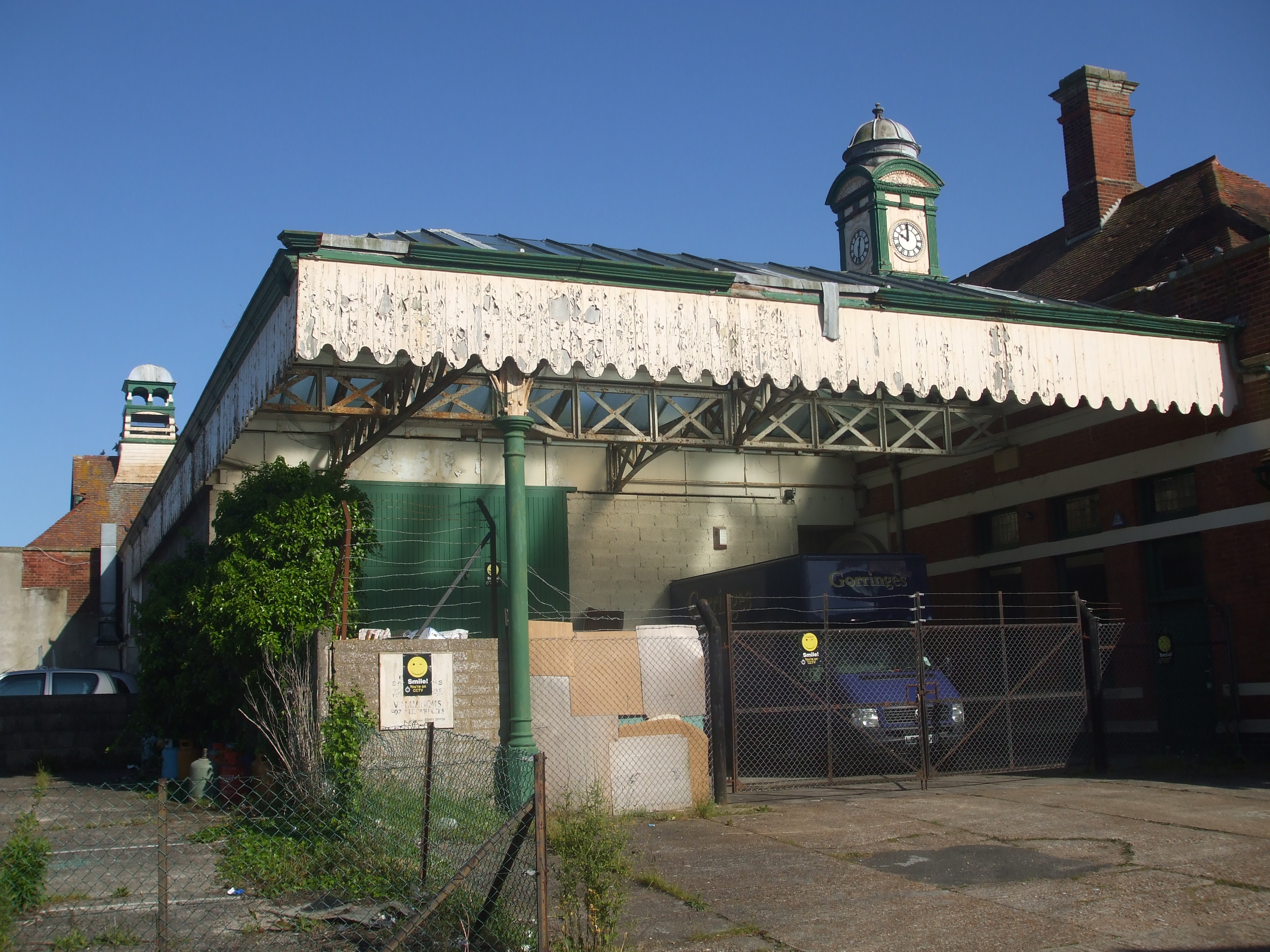
Surviving section of canopy to the rear of the station.

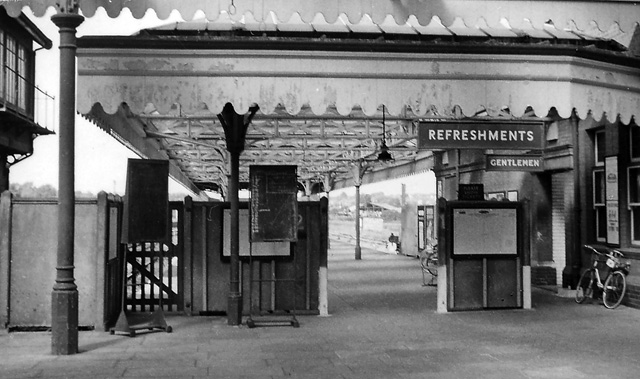
Bexhill West station concourse in 1962.

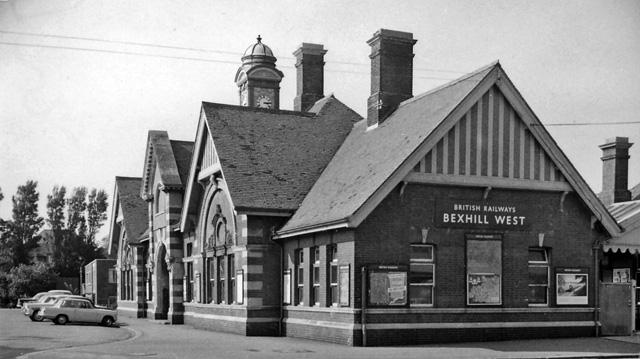
View westward on Terminus Road in 1962.

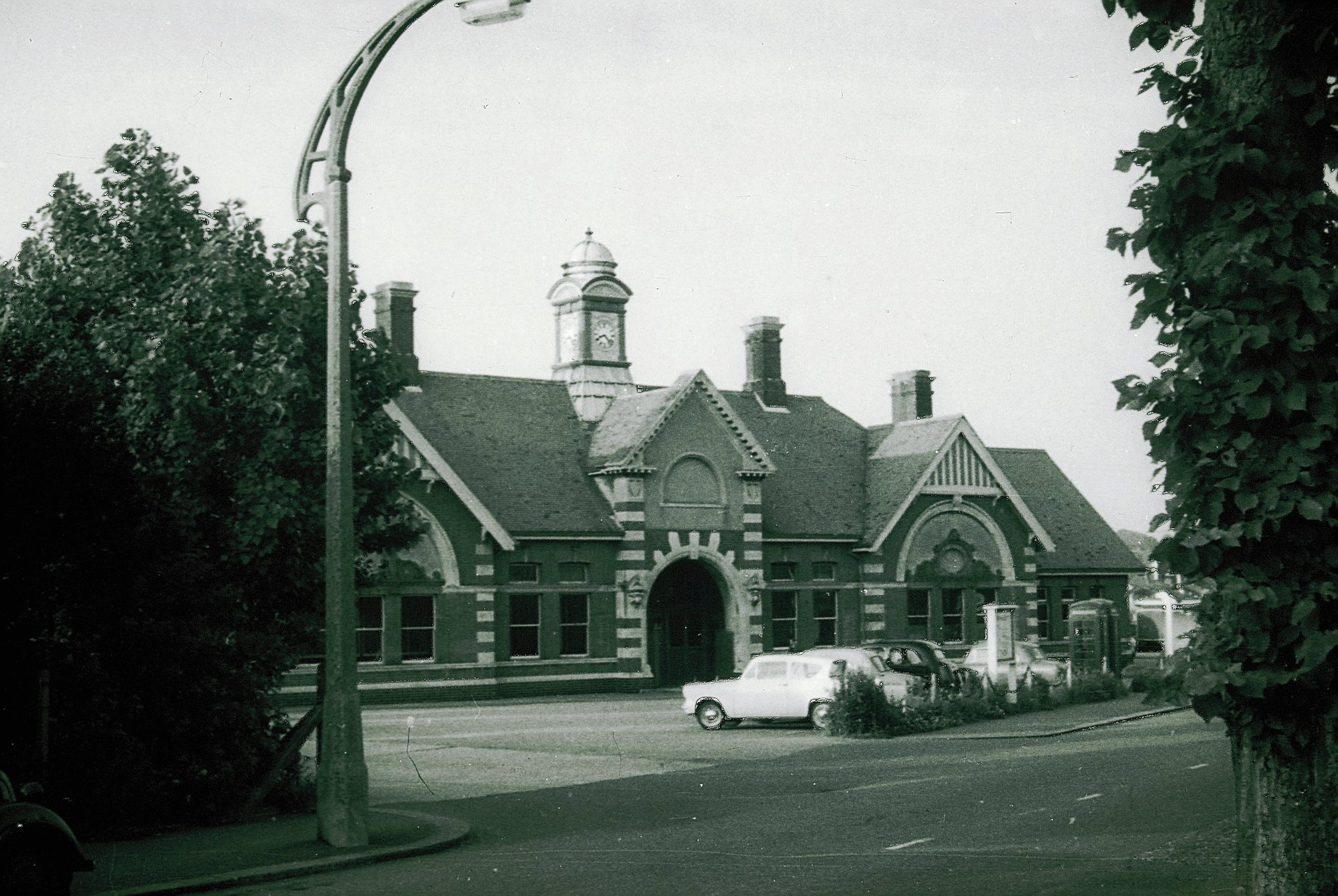
Main building 1964.

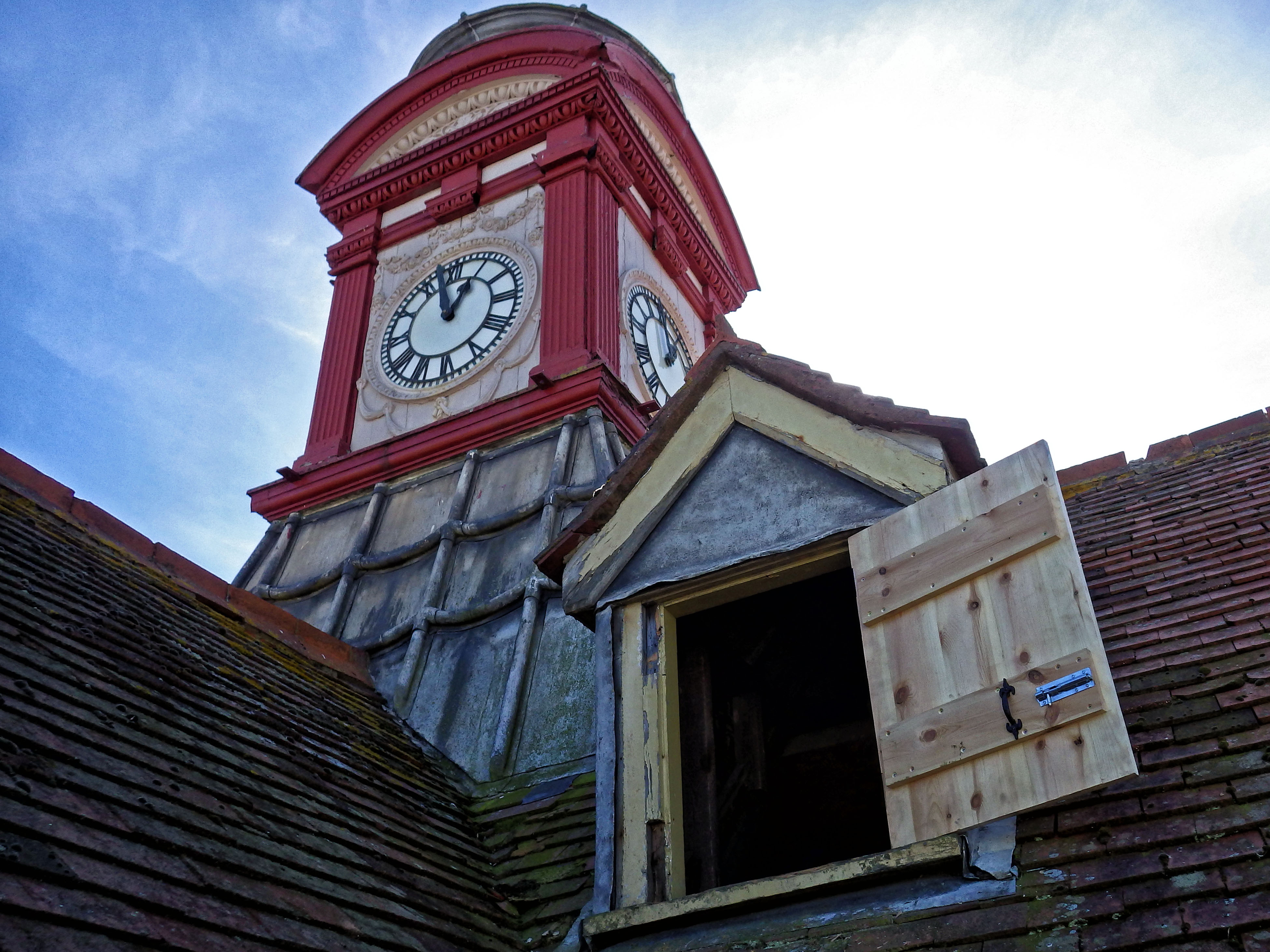
The clock tower.

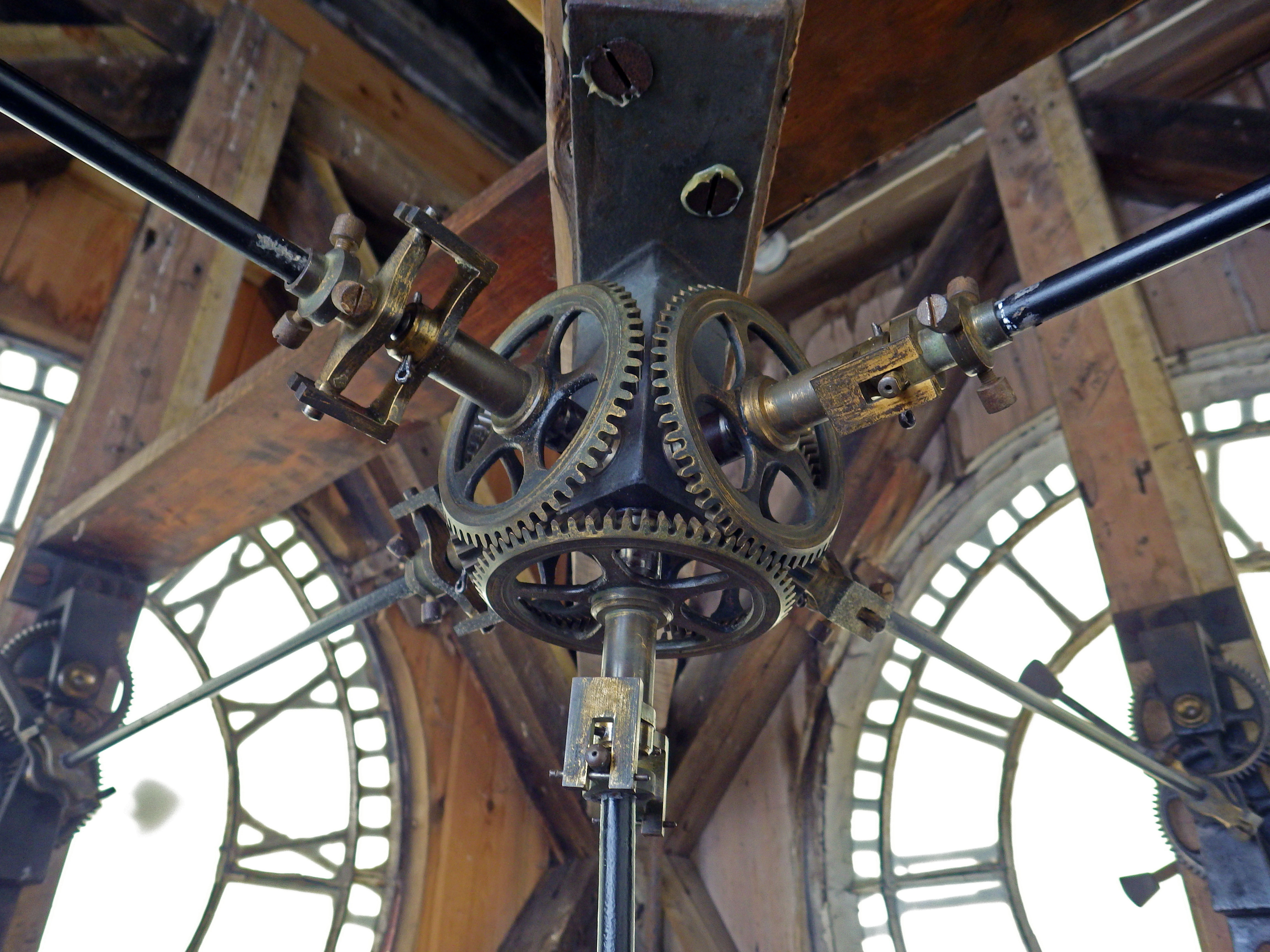
Recently restored clock mechanism.
