= Bexhill West branch line =

Railway branch line in East Sussex, England

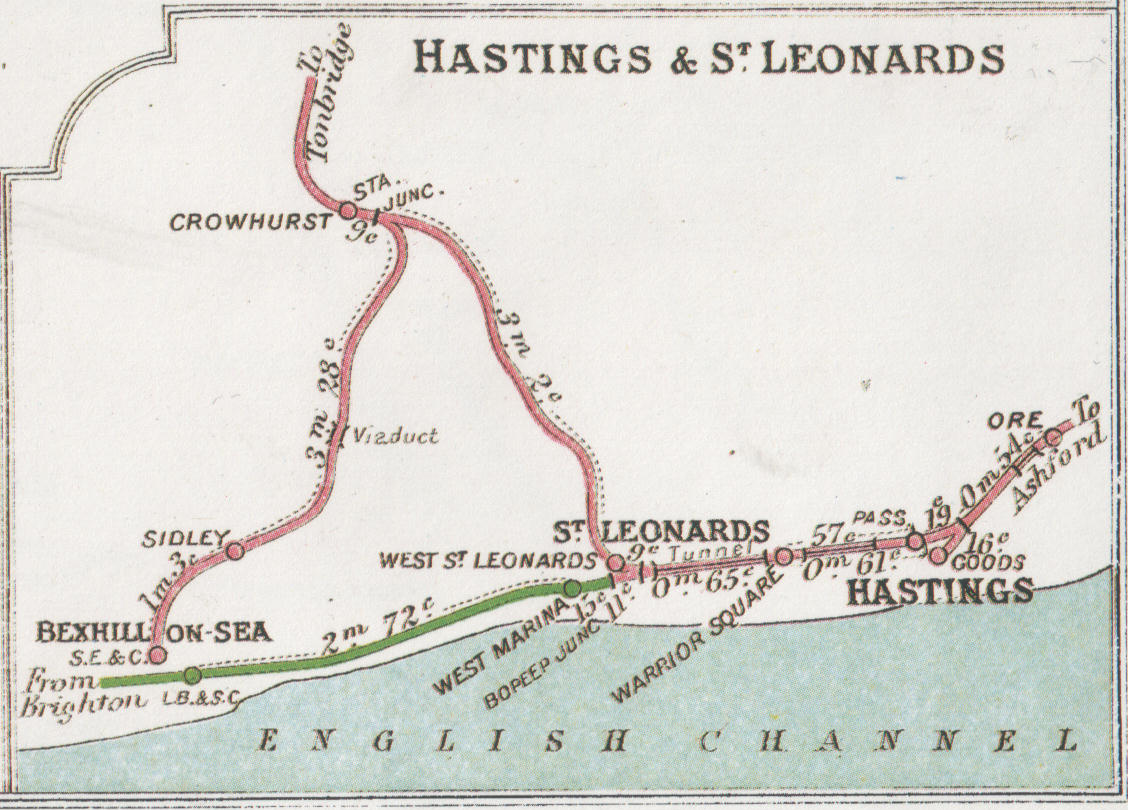
- The Bexhill West branch

Overview
- Status: Closed
- Owner: Crowhurst, Sidley & Bexhill Railway (1902–05); South Eastern Railway (1905–22); Southern Railway (1923-47); British Railways (1948–64)
- Locale: East Sussex, United Kingdom
- Termini: Crowhurst 50.8887°N 0.5014°E; Bexhill West 50.8407°N 0.4635°E
- Stations: 3

Service
- Type: Heavy rail
- System: Hastings Line
- Operator(s): South Eastern & Chatham Railway (1902–22); Southern Railway (1923–47); British Railways (1948–64)

History
- Opened: 1 June 1902
- Closed: 15 June 1964

Technical
- Line length: 4 miles 40 chains (7.24 km)
- Track gauge: 4 ft 8 1/2 in (1,435 mm) standard gauge

The Bexhill West branch line was a short double-track branch line which was opened on 1 June 1902. It was built by the Crowhurst, Sidley & Bexhill Railway under the patronage of the South Eastern Railway. The Chief Engineer to the project was Lt Col Arthur John Barry. Diverging from the Hastings Line at Crowhurst, an intermediate station at Sidley was served before the terminus was reached at Bexhill West. The line was closed under the Beeching Axe on 15 June 1964.

== History ==
=== Background ===
Crowhurst, Sidley and Bexhill Railway Act 1897
- Act of Parliament
- Parliament of the United Kingdom
- Long title: An Act for making a Railway from the Tunbridge Wells and Hastings Branch of the South Eastern Railway at Crowhurst to Bexhill and for other purposes.
- Citation: 60 & 61 Vict. c. cvii

Dates
- Royal assent: 15 July 1897

Text of statute as originally enacted

In the late 19th century, Bexhill had expanded rapidly. The town had been served by the London, Brighton and South Coast Railway since the opening of Bexhill Central on 27 June 1846. In 1896, a line was promoted by the Crowhurst, Sidley and Bexhill Railway, which was nominally independent. The scheme was supported by the South Eastern Railway, which entered into an operating arrangement with the London, Chatham and Dover Railway which came into effect on 1 January 1899, forming the South Eastern and Chatham Railway. The Crowhurst, Sidley and Bexhill Railway Company was incorporated in 1897, and permission was granted in the Crowhurst, Sidley and Bexhill Railway Act 1897 (60 & 61 Vict. c. cvii) for the line's construction. Lt Col Arthur John Barry was appointed as Chief Engineer to the project.

The construction of the branch included a new station at Crowhurst (grid reference TQ 760 129), on the Hastings Line, where a private siding had existed since about 1877; an intermediate station at Sidley (TQ 743 090) and the terminus at Bexhill-on-Sea (TQ 735 074). Between Crowhurst and Sidley, a major viaduct was built to carry the line across a valley. The line was supported by the South Eastern Railway because it was hoped that passengers would use that line instead of the London, Brighton and South Coast Railway's routes to London, which were 10 miles (16 km) or 16 miles (26 km) longer, depending on whether one travelled via Plumpton or Brighton. Seven contractors' locomotives were used in the construction of the line, one of which was an 0-6-0ST named St Leonards. Over 300,000 cubic yards (230,000 m^{3}) of earth was moved during the construction of the line. Initially, the line had some success, but following the electrification of the railway between Hastings and Brighton in 1935, traffic on the branch declined.

=== Description ===
The line diverged from the Hastings Line at a point 9 chains (180 m) south of Crowhurst and headed in a generally southerly direction. After crossing the Combe Haven Viaduct, the line swung to the south west. Sidley station was reached at 3 miles 37 chains (5.57 km). The line then continued in a south westerly direction, which became southerly on the approach to Bexhill West, 4 miles 40 chains (7.24 km) from Crowhurst. The line was double track throughout.

The largest structure on the line was the Combe Haven Viaduct (grid reference TQ 763 104), which was also known as the Filsham, Sidley or Crowhurst Viaduct. It was 416 yards (380 m) long, and 67 feet (20 m) high, with seventeen arches. The viaduct took two years to build, due to the nature of the ground it was built on. Built at a cost of £244,000, over 9,000,000 bricks were used in the construction of the viaduct. Concrete blocks were used for the foundations, each one measuring 52 by 30 feet (15.8 by 9.1 m) and 32 feet (9.8 m) deep. Following the closure of the line, it was proposed in late 1968 to demolish the viaduct. Local residents were opposed to the plan, and a question was asked in Parliament by Neill Cooper-Key regarding the preservation of the viaduct, which was not listed. Kenneth Robinson answered that British Railways were prepared to transfer ownership of the viaduct to any group willing to take it, but that maintenance costs were considerable.

There were three stations built for the line:

- Crowhurst was built to serve the branch. The station was provided with two through tracks and two tracks to serve the platforms. Each platform had a bay serving the branch. Crowhurst Junction was 9 chains (180 m) south of the station.
- Sidley station was opened with the branch on 1 June 1902. It was closed during the First World War on 1 January 1917 before reopening on 14 June 1920. The entrance at Sidley Station for services to Bexhill West was down some steps, while the Crowhurst and London platform had direct access from the road. The station also had a small goods yard and coal merchants. The original entrance building was demolished in 1971. A petrol station now stands on the site.
- Bexhill West was the terminus of the line. It had two island platform, two signal boxes, an extensive goods yard, and an engine shed. Only platforms 1 and 2 would be used; platform 3 was abandoned and platform 4 never had tracks. The station was temporarily closed on 1 January 1917 before reopening on 1 March 1919. It opened as Bexhill in 1902, then renamed Bexhill-on-Sea in 1920; Bexhill (Eastern) on 9 July 1923; before finally becoming Bexhill West in November 1929.

=== Operation ===
The line was operated from the outset by the South Eastern and Chatham Railway. The South Eastern Railway absorbed the Crowhurst, Sidley and Bexhill Railway Company in 1905. Under the SE&CR, services were worked by the older classes of SER locomotives, which were stationed at Bexhill. These continued until 1936, when push-pull trains were introduced. Under British Railways, push-pull services were operated by H Class 0-4-4T locomotives. Through services between Bexhill and Charing Cross were worked by Schools Class 4-4-0 locomotives.; these were withdrawn at the beginning of the Second World War and never reinstated. Between 27 November 1949 and 5 June 1950, Bo Peep tunnel was closed to traffic and all services on the Hastings line were diverted to Bexhill West. A push-pull service operated between Crowhurst Junction and West St Leonards during the closure of the tunnel.

When steam was eliminated from the Hastings Line, Diesel-Electric Multiple Units took over the services. This took place in June 1958; a new timetable was introduced at the same time, providing the line with an hourly service. During the latter years of steam on the Hastings Line, a service between Etchingham and Bexhill West was operated for schoolchildren. It was continued during the early years of the Hastings Diesel units; these were six-car trains, but the service was not shown in public timetables.

A daily freight train ran from Tonbridge to Bexhill West. In 1958 it was usually hauled by a Q class engine.

== Closure ==
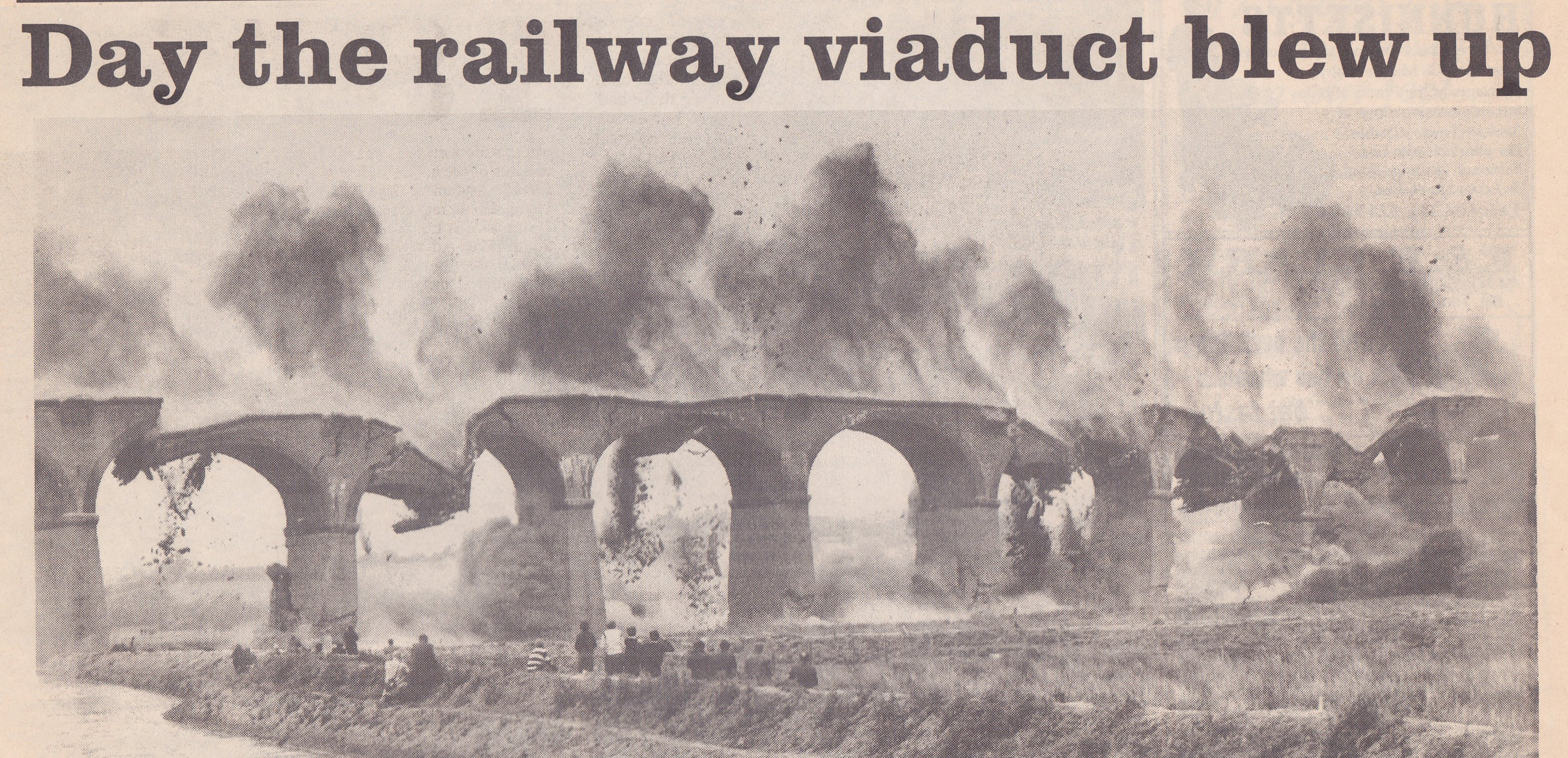
Crowhurst Viaduct demolition, 1969

It is claimed that the timetables were altered to the detriment of those commuters who wished to use the line. Fares were also raised, adding a further disincentive. The line was closed as part of the Beeching Axe. The last day of public services was 14 June 1964. Some of the services on that day were operated by 6S DEMU № 1007, and 2H DEMU № 1120. The 6S was running reduced to four carriages at the time. The Coombe Valley viaduct was demolished in two stages, on 23 May and 12 June 1969.

== Sources ==
- Beecroft, Geoffrey (1986). The Hastings Diesels Story. Chessington: Southern Electric Group. ISBN 0-906988-20-9.
- Butt, R.V.J. (1995). The Directory of Railway Stations. Yeovil: Patrick Stephens Ltd. ISBN 1-85260-508-1. R508.
- Gough, Terry (1999). Branch Lines Recalled. Great Addington: Silver Link Publishing. ISBN 1-85794-126-8.
- Griffiths, Roger (1989). Southern Sheds in Camera. Oxford: Oxford Publishing Company / Haynes. ISBN 0-86093-415-2. T415.
- Hamilton Ellis, C. (1971). The London Brighton and South Coast Railway. London: Ian Allan. ISBN 0-7110-0269-X.
- Jewell, Brian (1984). Down the line to Hastings. Southborough: The Baton Press. ISBN 0-85936-223-X.
- Kidner, R. W. (1963). The South Eastern & Chatham Railway. Tarrant Hinton: The Oakwood Press.
- Mitchell, Vic; Smith, Keith (1987). Southern Main Lines, Tonbridge to Hastings including the Bexhill West Branch. Midhurst: Middleton Press. ISBN 978-0-906520-44-4.
- Oppitz, Leslie (1987). Sussex Railways Remembered. Newbury: Countryside Books. ISBN 0-905392-99-X.
- Railway Clearing House (1982). Pre-Grouping Railway Junction Diagrams, 1914. London: Ian Allan. ISBN 0-7110-1256-3.
- Whitehouse, Patrick; St John Thomas, David (1992). The Great Days of the Southern Railway. London, New York, Sydney, Toronto: Book Club Associates. CN9378.
- Welch, Michael (2004). Southern DEMUs. Capital Transport. ISBN 1-85414-287-9.
