= Church of St Mary and St Joseph, Poplar =

Coordinates: 51°30′43.3″N 0°1′14.26″W

St Mary and St Joseph
- Church of St Mary and St Joseph
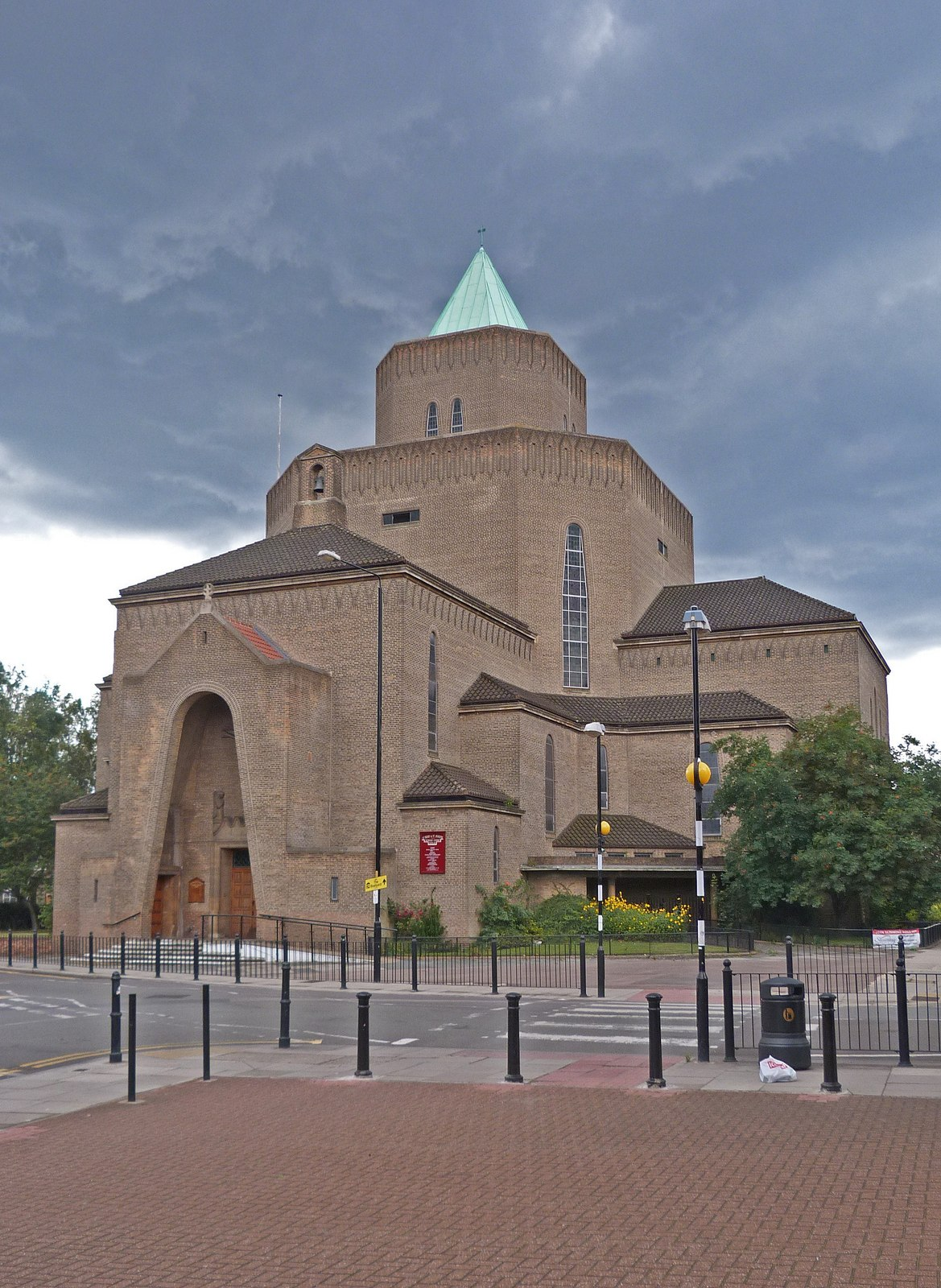
- Church of St Mary and St Joseph

- Location of church within Tower Hamlets, London
- OS grid reference: TQ 37452 81090
- Location: Tower Hamlets, London
- Country: England
- Denomination: Roman Catholic
- Website: parish.rcdow.org.uk/poplar/

History
- Status: Active
- Consecrated: October 1960

Architecture
- Functional status: Parish church
- Heritage designation: Grade II
- Designated: 5 March 1998
- Architect: Adrian Gilbert Scott
- Style: Art Deco / Jazz modern Byzantine Revival
- Completed: July 1954

Administration
- Province: Westminster
- Archdiocese: Westminster

Clergy
- Archbishop: Vincent Nichols
- Priest: Fr Andrew Bowden

The Church of St Mary and St Joseph is a 20th-century Roman Catholic parish church in Poplar located in Tower Hamlets, London, England.

== History ==
The modern church was built in 1951-1954, as part of the Festival of Britain's Lansbury Estate Live Architecture Exhibition, and was consecrated by Cardinal Godfrey in October 1960. It replaced an earlier church of the 1850s by William Wardell that was destroyed in the Second World War.

== Architecture ==
The building is listed Grade II. Its architect was Adrian Gilbert Scott, who specialised in ecclesiastical buildings.

On a Greek Cross plan, it is built of steel girders and brick, with a reinforced concrete spire. On the outside, the plan becomes a series of rectangular blocks.

It is notable for its elongated and tapered round parabolic arches (described as 'camel vaulted' at the time of its listing). Its mixed or transitional style combines Art Deco or Jazz Modern with elements suggesting Hispanic Moorish, ancient Persian or Egyptian. Gavin Stamp's descriptive phrase 'Jazz Modern Byzantine' was used in the church's listing.

The design has similarities to work by Giles Gilbert Scott and to Adrian Gilbert Scott's own earlier St. James Anglican Church (Vancouver), and its parabolic arches informed his later work on St Leonard's Church, St Leonards-on-Sea.

The interior contains stone reliefs of the Stations of the Cross by Peter Watts. The stained glass is by William Wilson of Edinburgh.
