= Shepherd's Well, Frognal Way =

Coordinates: 51°33′17″N 0°10′55″W

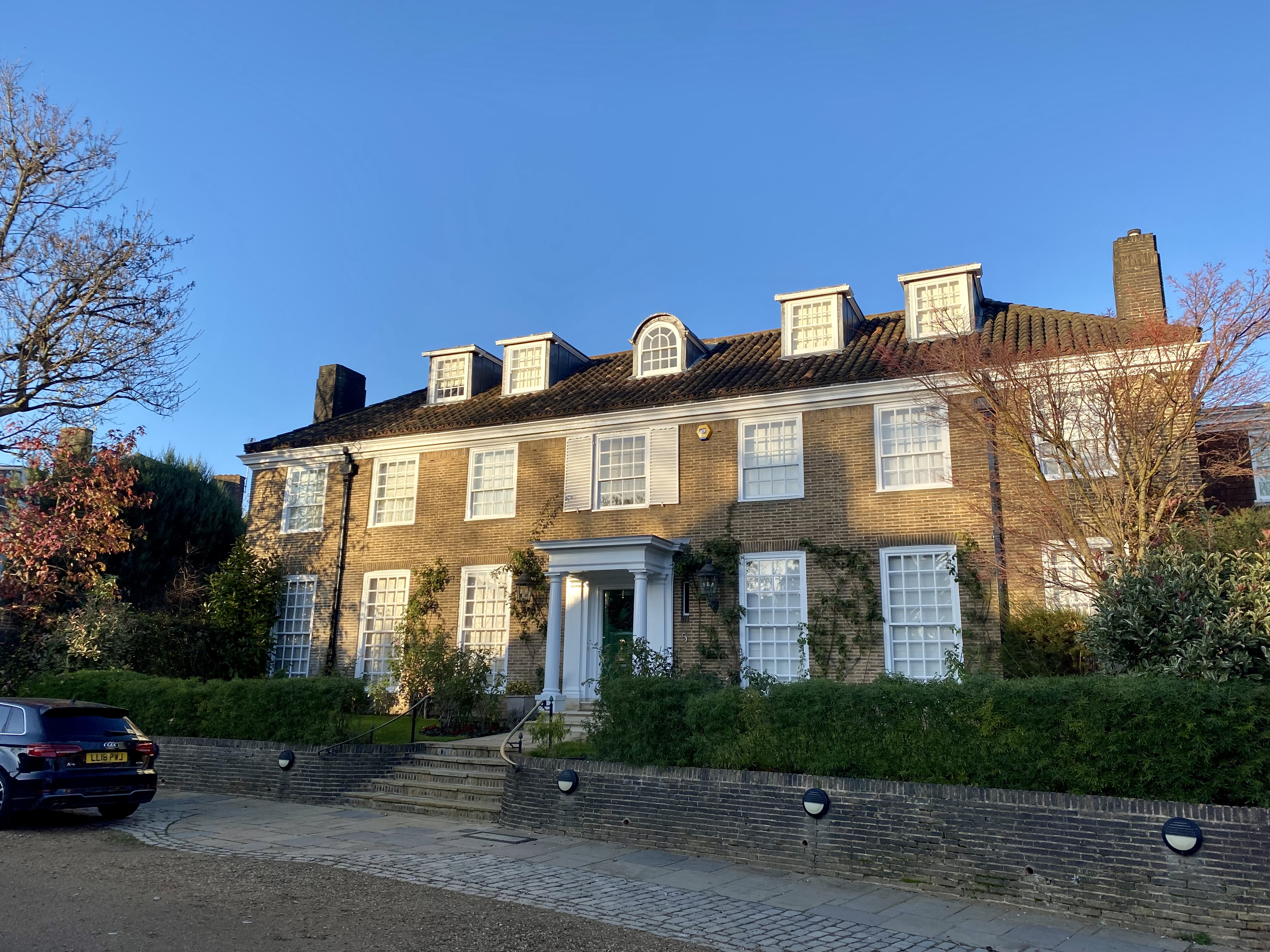
Shepherd's Well in 2022

Shepherd's Well at 5 Frognal Way in Frognal, London is a detached house that was designed by the architect Adrian Gilbert Scott as his personal residence. It was built between 1929 and 1930 and has been Grade II listed on the National Heritage List for England since January 1999.

The Historic England heritage listing for Shepherd's Well highlights its "grey-brown handmade bricks, red pantiled roof" and "white-painted wooden sash windows" and detects influence of Edwin Lutyens in its design.

Bridget Cherry, writing in the 1998 London: North edition of the Pevsner Architectural Guides described Shepherd's Well as "mannered Neo-Georgian" and noted that the "front door case has been removed".
