= St. James Anglican Church (Vancouver) =

St. James' Anglican Church (St. James Parish of Vancouver BC) (third and present building)
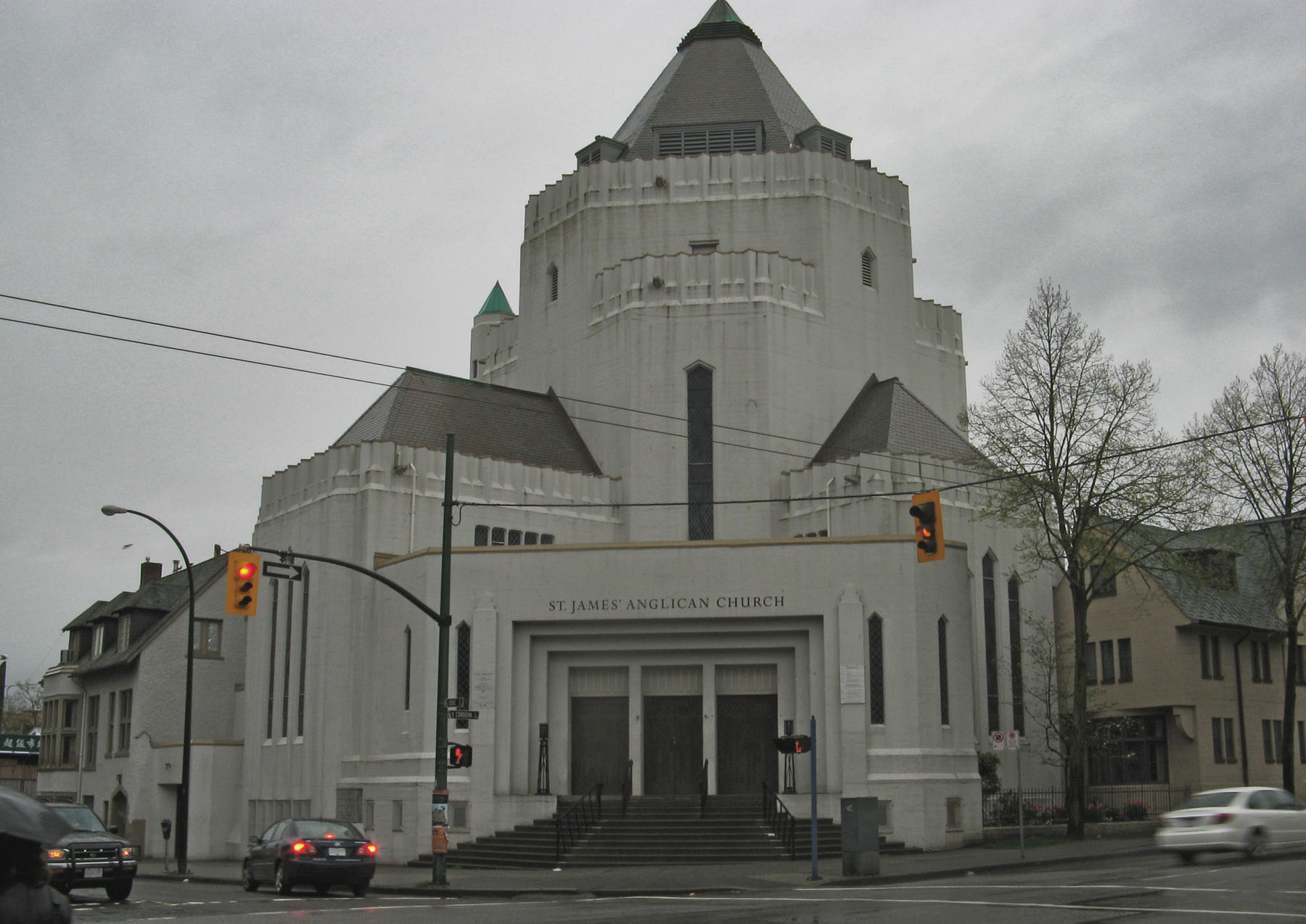
- St. James' Anglican Church in 2007
- St. James' Anglican Church (St. James Parish of Vancouver BC) (third and present building)
- 49.28249°N 123.09727°W
- Location: Vancouver, British Columbia
- Country: Canada
- Denomination: Anglican Church of Canada
- Churchmanship: Anglo-Catholic
- Website: www.stjames.bc.ca

History
- Former name(s): Parish of St. James, Granville
- Founded: 1881
- Founder(s): Acton Sillitoe, 1st Bishop of New Westminster, and sponsored by Capt. James Raymur, manager of Hasting Mills
- Events: Great Vancouver Fire

Architecture
- Heritage designation: Municipal
- Architect(s): Adrian Gilbert Scott, Sharp and Thompson - associate architects
- Style: Art Deco; Byzantine Revival; Gothic Revival; Romanesque Revival
- Completed: Summer 1937/Third bldg.

Specifications
- Materials: Reinforced concrete Slate and flat roofs

Administration
- Province: Ecclesiastical Province of British Columbia and Yukon
- Diocese: New Westminster
- Archdeaconry: Burrard
- Deanery: Kingsway
- Parish: St. James Parish of Vancouver B.C.

Clergy
- Bishop(s): The Most Rev'd Archbishop John Stephens, 10th Bishop of New Westminster and 14th Metropolitan of the Ecclesiastical Province of British Columbia and Yukon
- Rector: The Rev'd Mtr. Amanda Ruston, OSBCn (effective September 29, 2025)

St. James' Anglican Church (Saint James Parish of Vancouver, BC) is a unique church building in the Diocese of New Westminster of the Anglican Church of Canada located at the north-east corner of East Cordova Street and Gore Avenue in the City of Vancouver, British Columbia, Canada's Downtown Eastside district of the Strathcona neighbourhood.

The Parish boundaries are Burrard Inlet on the north, Cambie Street on the west, Clark Drive on the East and a portion of False Creek and Terminal Avenue on the south.

The first building was completed in the spring of 1881 on Alexander Street (west of Main Street) in the Township of Granville (aka Gastown), Burrard Inlet to the north west of the present site and was sponsored by Captain James Raymur, the manager of Hastings Mill. Granville was renamed Vancouver when the town was incorporated as a city on April 6, 1886. Before being moved to the second site by the Canadian Pacific Railway (CPR) to make way for their main rail line, this building burned down in the Great Vancouver Fire of June 13, 1886. The heat of the fire melted the church bell into a puddle that was eventually put on display at the Museum of Vancouver.

The second building was built in 1886 on land (east of Main Street) donated by the CPR. It was a post-and-beam English country-style building. Being a wooden structure, it was not considered as permanent. It was torn down in 1935 to make way for the present building. Some furnishings were incorporated into the third building.

The present (and third) church building was designed by Adrian Gilbert Scott who later designed the Church of St. Mary and St. Joseph, Poplar, London, England which has architectural similarities. Another similar church was built in Cairo, Egypt however it was torn down for a new bridge. Its Greek cross design is a combination of Art Deco, Romanesque Revival, Byzantine Revival, and Gothic Revival architecture. The walls are made of reinforced concrete, while the roof is made of slate. The building was constructed between 1935 and 1937 and consecrated in 1938.

The church has an eight-bell chime and its organ is a Casavant Frères (Opus 1605) with 3 manuals, 31 stops and 1,760 pipes. Its High Mass choir is composed of about 20 members including 4 paid section leads and 4 choral scholars.

St. James was the first Anglican parish in Vancouver, formerly The Township of Granville (aka Gastown), until the establishment of Christ Church (local church), a daughter church, in 1888 that in 1929 became Christ Church Cathedral - the Diocese's second cathedral. Another daughter church, St. Paul's Anglican Church, was established in 1889, and later became a separate parish and is located in the city's West End. Fr. Fiennes-Clinton oversaw the founding of Christ Church (now the Diocese's second Cathedral), St. Paul’s (West End) , St. Michael’s (Mount Pleasant) and St. John’s (North Vancouver), and fostered the Mission to Seamen. He was made a lifelong member of the Vancouver Fire Brigade due to his vigilant ringing of the church bell as a fire alarm and his assistance in the rescue of citizens during the Great Fire of 1886. In 1887 he founded the Vancouver Public Library at 136 Cordova Street, and he assisted Sister Frances with the opening of St. Luke’s Hospital in 1892 (the first and only one at the time).

The worship tradition is Anglo-Catholic. Offices of Morning and Evening Prayer are said daily via Zoom. Said (Low) Mass is celebrated daily except Sunday when an on-line Liturgy via Zoom is held. A Solemn (High) or Sung Mass is sung every Sunday at 10:30 a.m.

The Rector of St James Parish of Vancouver is the Rev'd Mtr. Amanda Ruston, OSBCn, who became Rector in 2025. Leah Postman is the Rector's Warden, and Joanna Lam and Bev Wilson are the other Church Wardens. The elected Trustees, who also serve as the parish's Lay Delegates to Synod, are Michelle Heshka, John Daniel, and Tiffany Vrioni-Das. Shona Corser is the Treasurer, and Linda Adams is the Vestry Clerk. The Parish Council is chaired by Louisa Farrell. The Parish Vestry meets annually or more often as required.

Rectors

The Rev. Fr. George Ditcham, Vicar (1881-1885)

The Rev. Fr. Henry Glynne Fiennes-Clinton (1885–1912)

The Rev. Henry Edwardes (1912-1915)

The Rev. Henry A. Collins (1915-1920)

The Rev. Fr. Robert G. Harker (1920-1921)

The Rev. Canon Wilberforce Cooper (1921-1952)

The Rev. David Sommerville (1952-1960) - later 6th Bishop of New Westminster and 7th Metropolitan of the Ecclesiastical Province of British Columbia and Yukon

The Rev. Edward Hulford (1960-1965)

The Rev. J. Gordon Gardiner (1966-1988)

The Ven. David Retter, Archdeacon of Burrard (1988-2004)

The Rev. Mark Greewaway-Robbyns (2007-2013)

The Ven. Kevin Hunt, Archdeacon of Burrard (2015-2024)

The Rev. Mtr. Amanda Ruston, OSBCn (2025-present)

== See also ==
- Kathleen O'Melia
