= Sidley railway station =

Former railway station in England

Coordinates: 50.8542°N 0.4744°E

Sidley
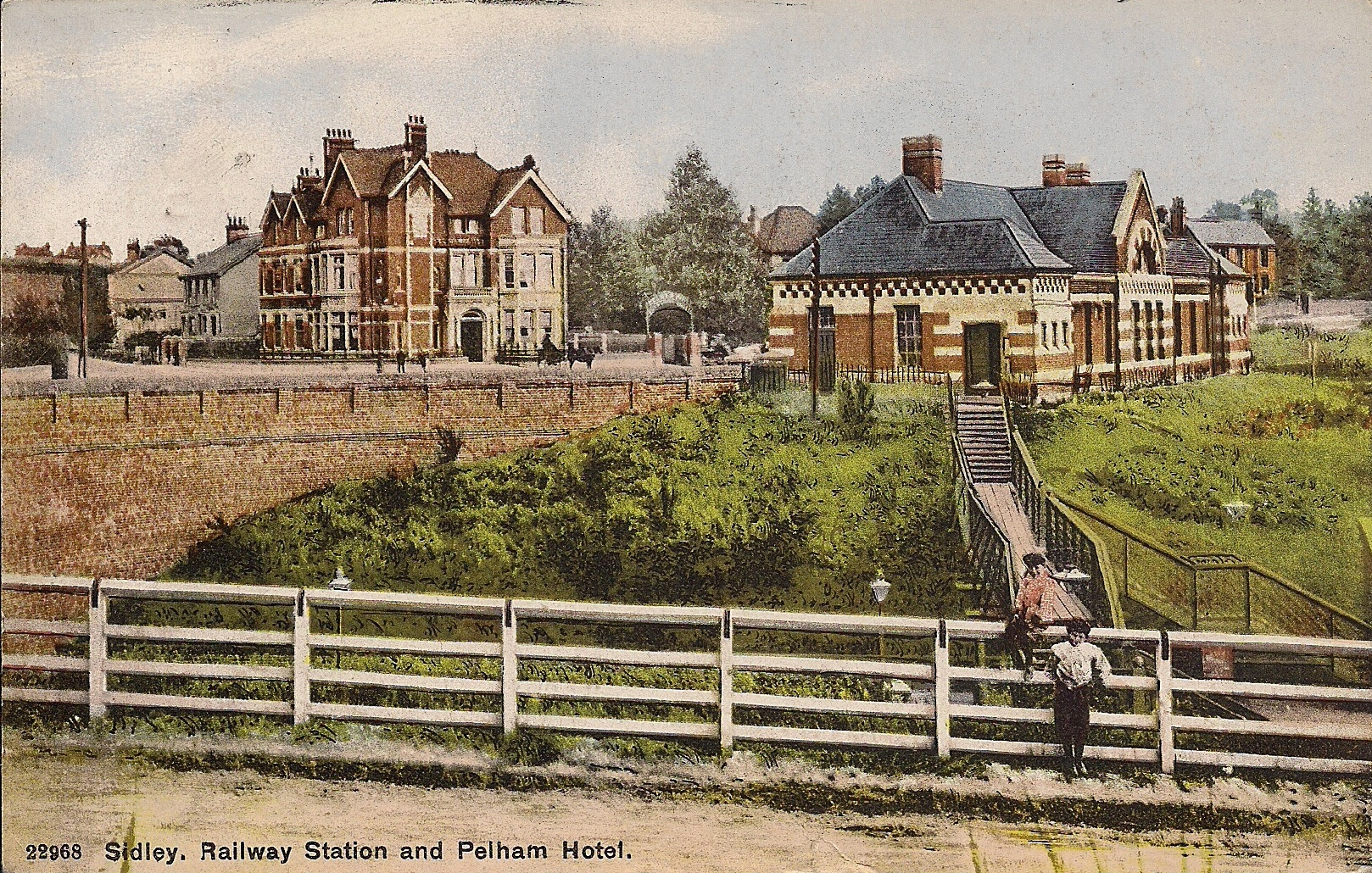
- An old photo of the Sidley railway station

General information
- Location: Sidley, Rother, East Sussex; England
- Grid reference: TQ742090
- Platforms: 2

Other information
- Status: Disused

History
- Original company: Crowhurst, Sidley and Bexhill Railway
- Pre-grouping: South Eastern and Chatham Railway
- Post-grouping: Southern Railway; Southern Region of British Railways

Key dates
- 1 June 1902: Opened
- 1 January 1917: closed
- 14 June 1920: reopened
- 15 June 1964: Closed
Location

Sidley railway station is a closed railway station In Sidley, East Sussex. It was on the Bexhill West branch of the Hastings line from Tunbridge Wells. It was opened by the South Eastern and Chatham Railway and was operated by the Southern Region of British Railways on closing. All the station buildings and platforms were demolished soon after closure. The goods shed was the last railway building on the site which was demolished in 2009 having been derelict for many years. The cutting where the station was situated was infilled to about platform level and the levelled land used by a motorbike training centre which closed in 2012. Work started in January 2013 on construction of a new Bexhill to Hastings link road which has been built along the trackbed through the site of the platforms and opened in 2015.

Preceding station	Disused railways	Following station
Bexhill West	British Rail; Southern Region; Bexhill West Branch Line	Crowhurst
