= Crowhurst railway station =

Railway station in East Sussex, England

Coordinates: 50.889°N 0.501°E

Crowhurst
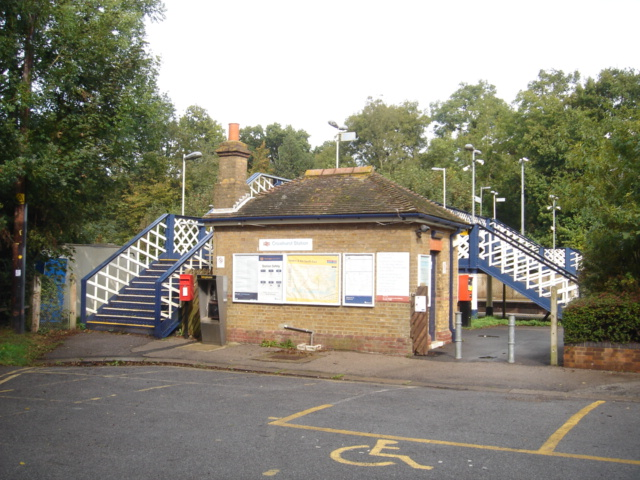
- The station in 2007

General information
- Location: Crowhurst, Rother; England
- Grid reference: TQ760128
- Manager: Southeastern
- Platforms: 2

Other information
- Station code: CWU
- Classification: DfT category E

Key dates
- 1 June 1902: Station opened
- 1 June 1902: Bexhill West branch opened
- 1964: Bexhill West branch closed

Passengers
- 2021/22: ▲30,520
- 2022/23: ▲36,444
- 2023/24: ▲38,576
- 2024/25: ▲45,154
- 2025/26: ▲48,164
Location
Notes
- Passenger statistics from the Office of Rail and Road

Crowhurst railway station is on the Hastings line in the south of England and serves the village of Crowhurst, East Sussex. It is 57 miles 50 chains (92.7 km) down the line from London Charing Cross. The station and all trains serving it are operated by Southeastern.

== History ==
Although the section of the Hastings line through Crowhurst was completed in 1852, no station existed at this location until the South Eastern and Chatham Railway (SECR) built a branch line to Bexhill West in 1902. Crowhurst served as a junction station, with Up and Down through platforms and a bay platform at the southern end of each until closure of the Bexhill West branch in 1964. Most of the station buildings have been demolished, but the remains of the bay platforms are still visible and a small building survives on the Up side. The station is normally unstaffed.

== Services ==
All services at Crowhurst are operated by Southeastern using Class 375 EMUs.

The typical off-peak service in trains per hour is:

- 1 tph to London Charing Cross
- 1 tph to Hastings

Additional services, including trains to and from and London Cannon Street and Ore call at the station in the peak hours.

Preceding station	National Rail	Following station
Battle	Southeastern Hastings Line	West St Leonards
	Disused railways	
Battle	British Rail Southern Region Bexhill West Branch Line	Sidley
