= Adrian Gilbert Scott =

English ecclesiastical architect

- Born: 6 August 1882
- Died: 23 April 1963 (aged 80)
- Education: Beaumont College
- Occupation: Architect
- Buildings: St James' Anglican Church, Vancouver, Canada St Joseph RC Church, Harrow; Our Lady of Beauchief and St Thomas of Canterbury, Sheffield; All Saints Cathedral, Cairo; SS Mary & Joseph RC Church, Lansbury; St Joseph's, Upton; St Leonard's Church, St Leonards-on-Sea
- Projects: Aylesford Priory; Tower for The Holy Name Church Manchester

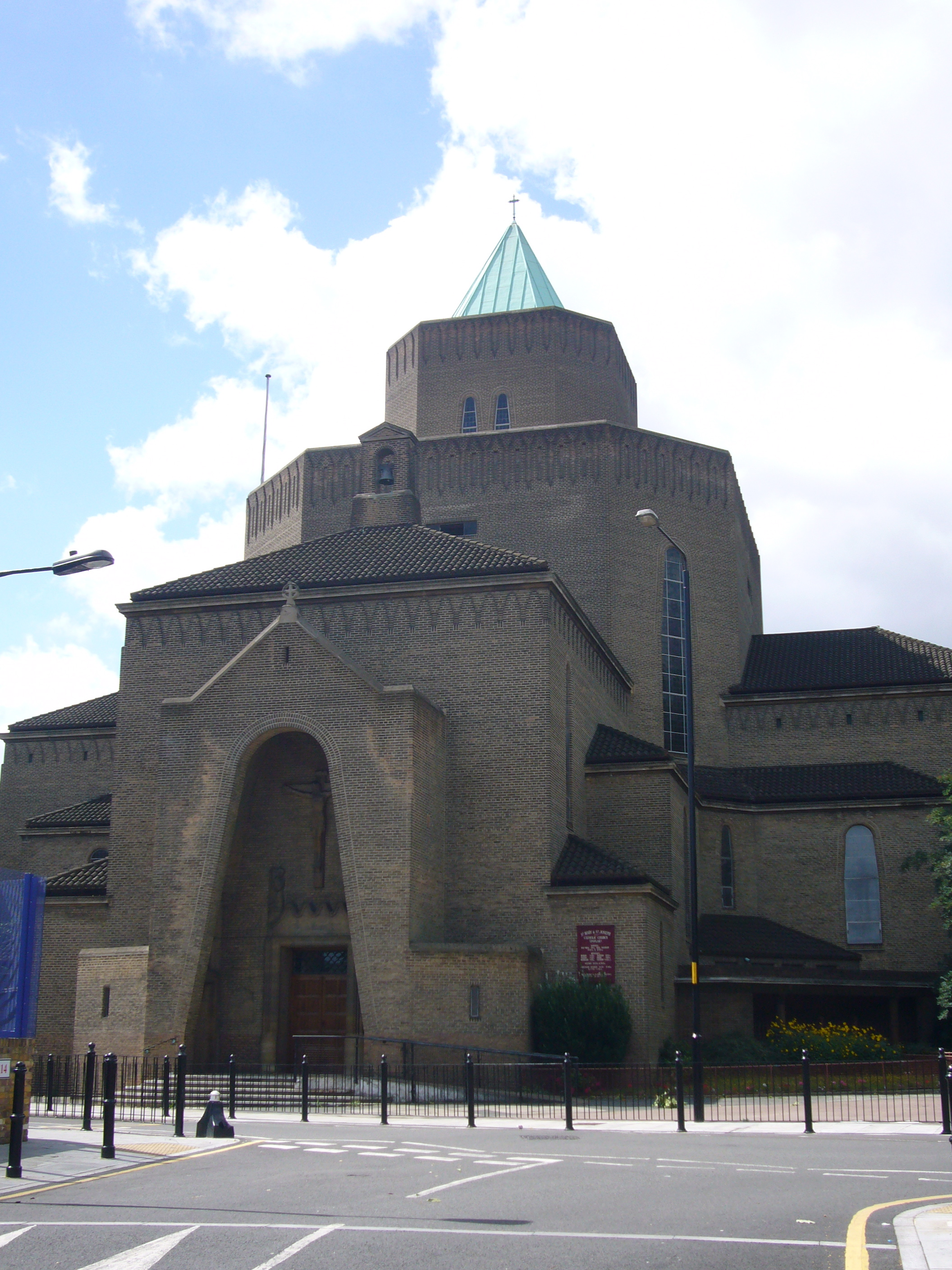
St. Mary and St. Joseph Church on the Lansbury Estate, Poplar, East London.

Adrian Gilbert Scott CBE (6 August 1882 – 23 April 1963) was an English ecclesiastical architect.

== Early life ==
Scott was the grandson of Sir Gilbert Scott (George Gilbert Scott), son of George Gilbert Scott, Jr. (founder of Watts & Company in 1874), nephew of John Oldrid Scott, and the younger brother to Sir Giles Gilbert Scott, all architects.

He was educated at Beaumont College, Old Windsor, as was his brother Giles, and designed the large war memorial still in the grounds of the college. He assisted his brother on a range of projects, including Liverpool Anglican Cathedral.

== Career ==
His early work includes his design of the school chapel at Mount St Mary's College in Spinkhill, South Yorkshire, which was completed in 1924, St Joseph RC Church, Harrow (1929–31) and the RC Church of Our Lady of Beauchief & St Thomas in Sheffield in 1932.

His work on the Anglican Cathedral in Cairo began in 1933 and it was consecrated in 1938. This building was demolished in 1978 to make way for the building of a new Nile bridge (see Episcopal Church in Jerusalem and the Middle East).

Scott embraced gothic and modernist designs, and he travelled to Canada in the course of his work. The design of St James' Anglican Church in Vancouver is a combination of Art Deco, Romanesque Revival, Byzantine Revival, and Gothic Revival architecture. The walls are made of reinforced concrete, and the floor features an hydronic heating system. The building was constructed between 1935 and 1937 and consecrated in 1938.

He started work on an altar at Saint Augustine Church in 1938; as of 2006, it is unfinished. He is also remembered for his design of the tower at The Holy Name Church Manchester.

He was also responsible for the design of St Mary and St Joseph Roman Catholic Church on the post-war Lansbury Estate in Poplar, East London, which has architectural similarities to St James', Vancouver. On the Wirral he designed St Joseph's at Upton and had the principal responsibility (in collaboration with his brother Giles) for the design of the rebuilt St Leonard's Church, St Leonards-on-Sea, East Sussex (1953–61). The new building at Aylesford Priory (1958–1965) is his work too.

== Works ==
Year	Building	Location	Notes
1913	Grey Wings	Ashtead, Surrey	Grade II listed; collaboration with Giles Gilbert Scott
1924	Mount St Mary's College Memorial Chapel	Spinkhill, South Yorkshire	Grade II listed
1926–1928	Christ the King Roman Catholic Church	Wimbledon Park, London	
1928	Tower for the Church of the Holy Name of Jesus	Manchester	Grade I listed
1929–1930	Shepherd's Well	5 Frognal Way, Hampstead, London	Grade II listed; personal residence
1929–1931	Roman Catholic Church of St Joseph	Harrow, London	
1931–1932	Roman Catholic Church of Our Lady of Beauchief and St Thomas of Canterbury and Presbytery	Sheffield, South Yorkshire	Grade II listed
1932–1938	All Saint's Anglican Cathedral	Cairo, Egypt	demolished in 1978 to make way for a new Nile bridge
1933	School Chapel, Farnborough Hill	Farnborough, Hampshire	
1935	Spaniards Mount	61 Winnington Road, Hampstead Garden Suburb, London	Grade II listed; personal residence
1935–1937	St James' Anglican Church	Vancouver, British Columbia, Canada	
1937–1938	Roman Catholic Church of St Willibrords	Manchester	Grade II listed; collaboration with Reynolds & Scott
1951	Roman Catholic Church of the Immaculate Conception	Farm Street, Mayfair London	redesign of west front
1951–1954	Roman Catholic Church of St Mary and St Joseph	Lansbury Estate, Poplar, London	
1953–1954	Roman Catholic Church of St Joseph	Upton, Wirral	
1953–1961	St Leonard's Roman Catholic Church	St Leonards-on-Sea, East Sussex	collaboration with Giles Gilbert Scott
1957	Roman Catholic Church of Our Lady of Victories	Kensington, London	Grade II listed
1958–1965	Aylesford Priory	Aylesford, Kent	
1959	Roman Catholic Church of Our Lady and St Rose of Lima	Weoley Castle, Birmingham	
1959–1960	Roman Catholic Church of St Anthony	Portway, Woodhouse Park, Wythenshawe, Manchester	Grade II listed
1959–1961	St Alban's Anglican Church	Holborn, London	restoration after bomb damage
	G.K. Chesterton Memorial Tower, Roman Catholic Church of St Teresa	Beaconsfield, Buckinghamshire	
