= Spaniards Mount =

House in Hampstead Garden Suburb, London, England

Coordinates: 51.5759°N 0.1748°W

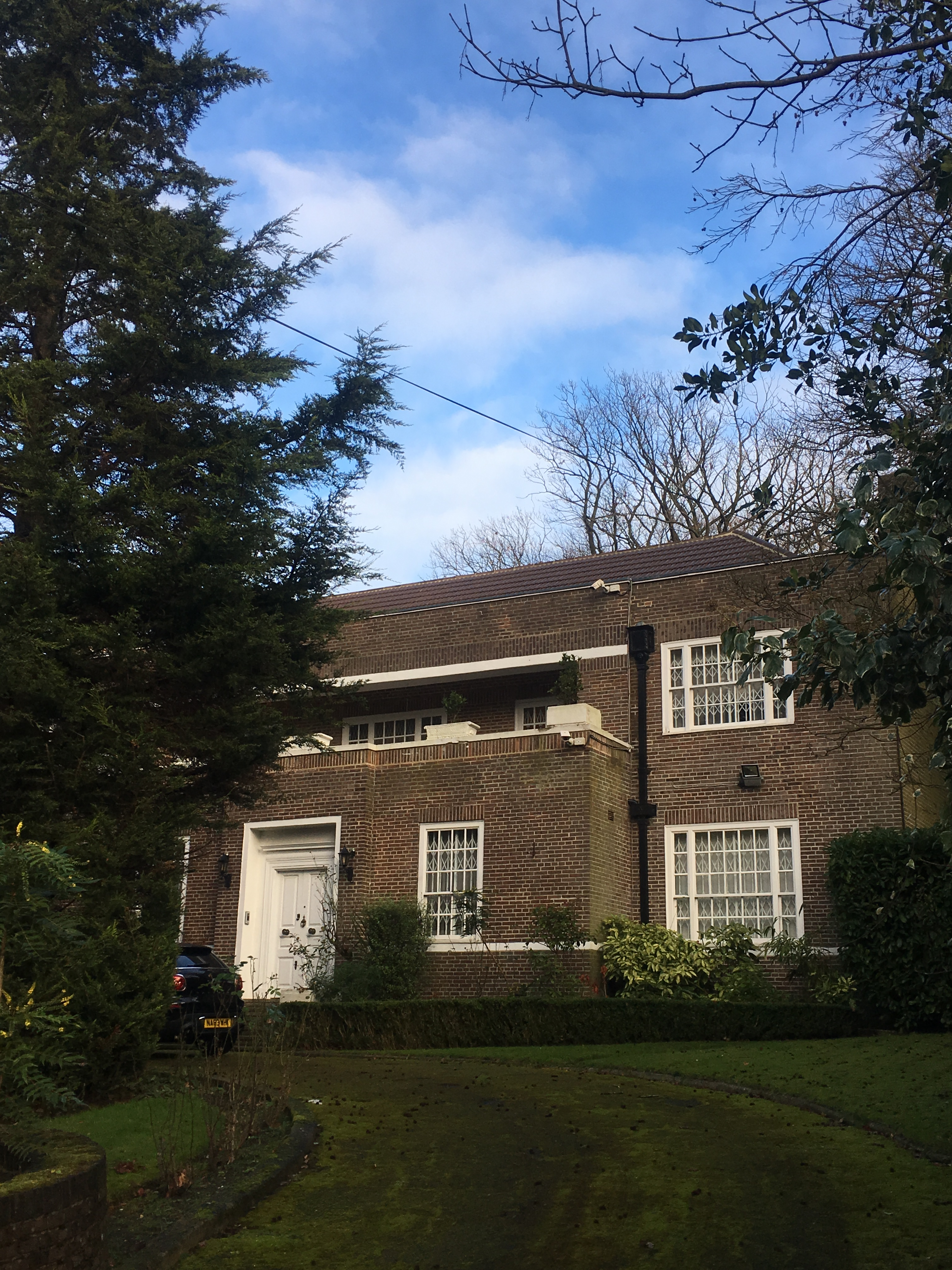
Spaniards Mount in December 2017

Spaniards Mount at 61 Winnington Road in Hampstead Garden Suburb, London is a detached house that was designed by the architect Adrian Gilbert Scott as his personal residence. It was built in 1935 and has been Grade II listed on the National Heritage List for England since November 1996.

== History ==
The Historic England heritage listing for Spaniards Mount notes that the "emphasis on pure geometry shows the clear influence of the Modern manner" and likens its design to the early 1920s domestic work of Frank Lloyd Wright in California. The exterior is praised for Scott's blending of "historicist detail with a Modernist feeling for mass and form". Scott's designs for Spaniards Mount were exhibited at the Royal Academy of Arts in 1938.

Bridget Cherry, writing in the 1998 London: North edition of the Pevsner Architectural Guides, listed Spaniards Mount as having been built in 1936 and wrote that it "quite harmoniously combines brick-facing and sash windows with a more modernist central balcony". Cherry noted that the house sits among "very showy...almost universally genteel Neo-Georgian" houses near Hampstead Golf Club.
