= Spaniard Knob =

Mountains in Georgia, United States

Coordinates: 34.8186310°N 83.7805688°W

Spaniard Knob or Spaniards Knob are the names of two distinct mountains in the Towns County, Georgia.

Spaniard Mountain is a summit in with an elevation of 3,793 feet (1,156 m). Spaniard Mountain most likely was named for the travels of Spanish conquistador Juan Pardo. A variant name is "Spaniard Knob".

Spaniards Knob is a summit with an elevation of 4,006 feet (1,221 m). A variant name is Rocky Knob. The Appalachian Trail goes along the northern slope of the mountain.

== Gallery ==
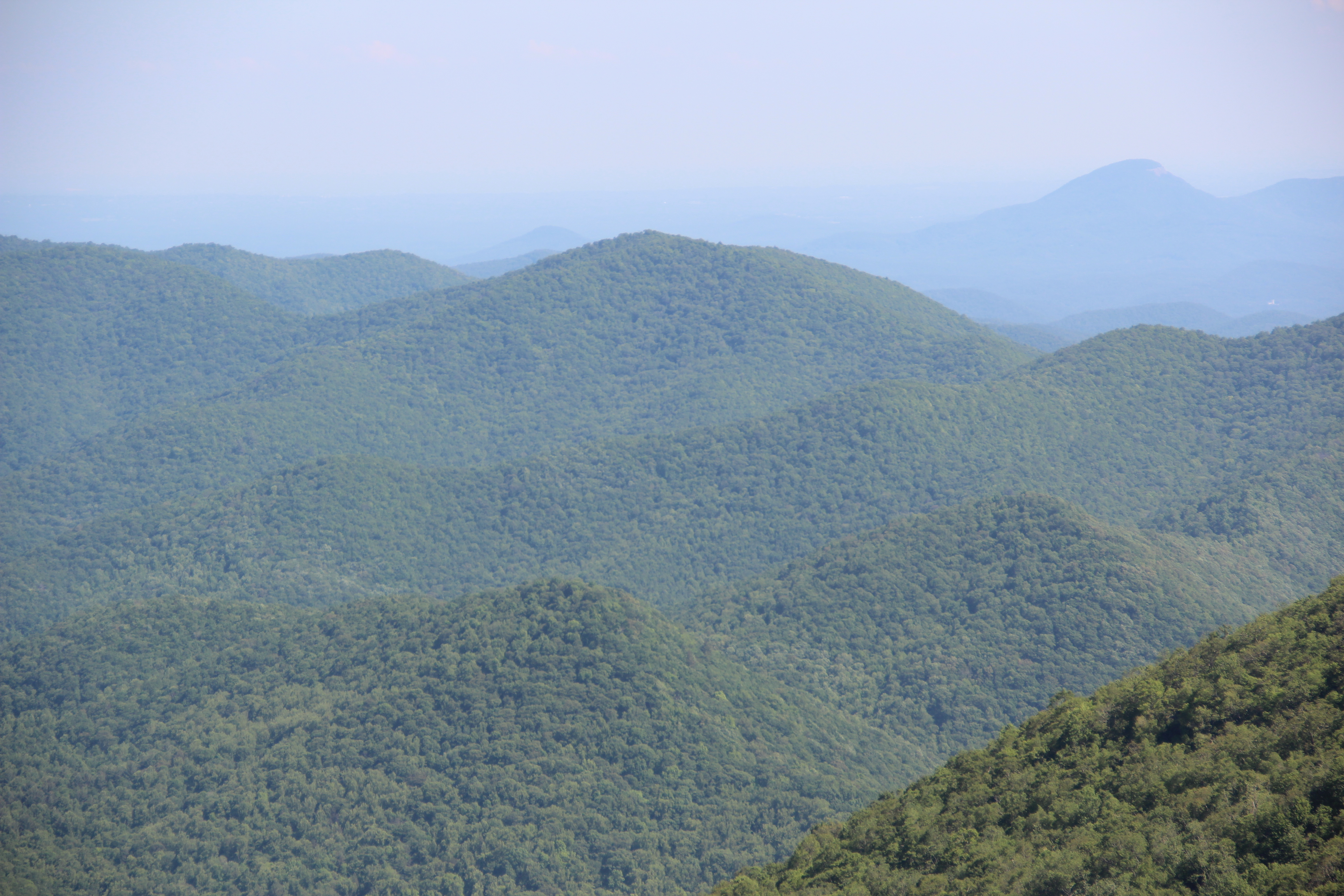
Spaniards Knob viewed from Brasstown Bald

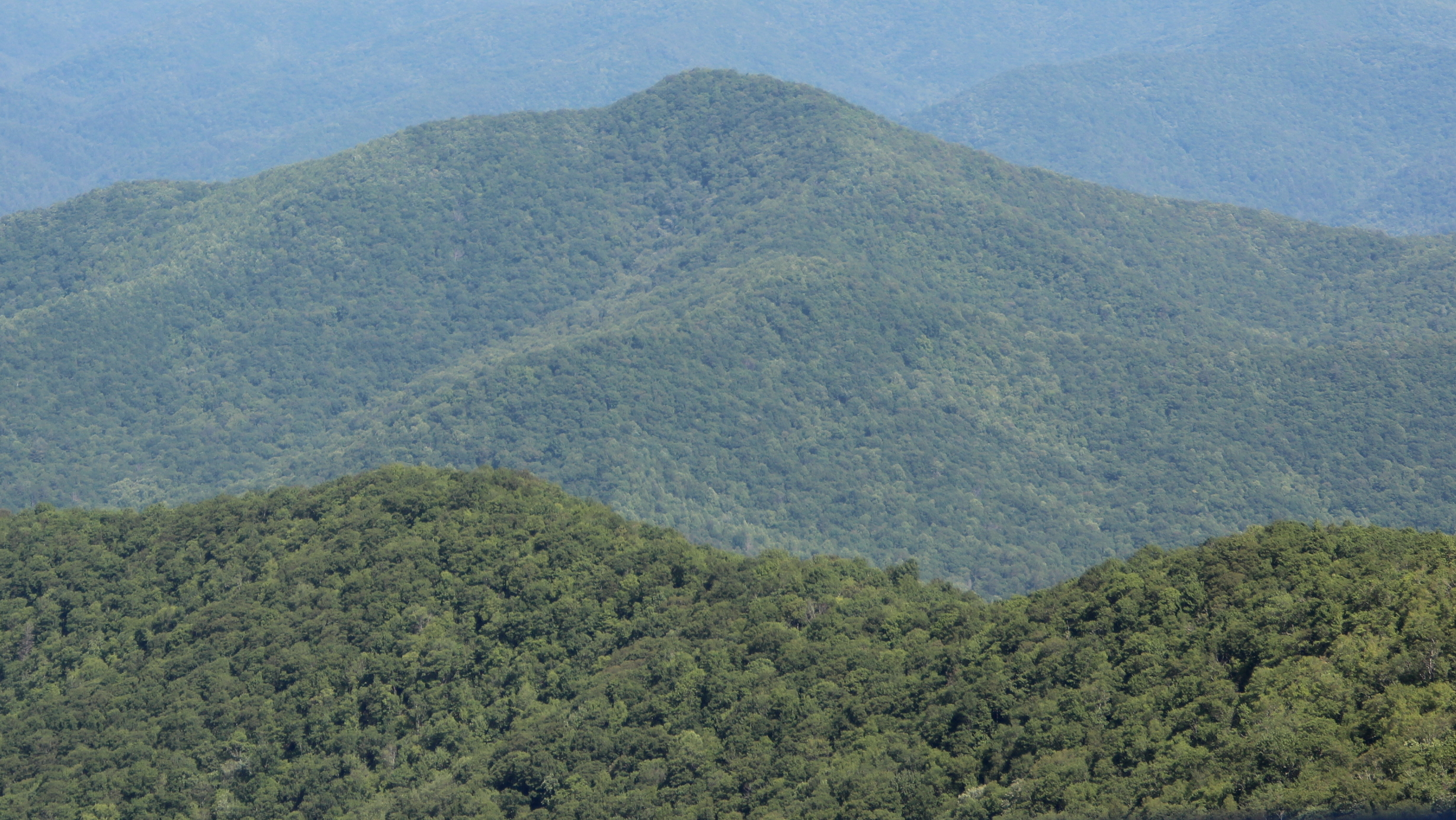
Spaniard Mountain viewed from Brasstown Bald
