= Murder of Billie-Jo Jenkins =

1997 unsolved murder in England

Billie-Jo Jenkins
- Born: 29 March 1983; East London, England
- Died: 15 February 1997 (aged 13); Hastings, East Sussex, England
- Cause of death: Murder by beating

Billie-Jo Margaret Jenkins (29 March 1983 – 15 February 1997) was an English girl who was murdered in Hastings, East Sussex in February 1997. The case gained widespread media attention and remains unsolved.

Her foster father, Siôn Jenkins, was originally convicted for the crime, but after two retrials in which the jury was unable to reach a verdict he was formally acquitted. He has been denied compensation on the grounds that there is no evidence to prove his innocence. He holds the rare distinction of having been acquitted despite never having been found not guilty by a jury. A second charge, relating to lies he had conceived about his qualifications in order to get his job as a deputy headteacher, was left to lie on file. Since his acquittal for murder, Sussex Police have maintained that there are no plans to reopen the murder investigation.

Billie-Jo's family have always maintained that Siôn Jenkins is guilty, and blamed the outcome of the final trial on the fact that the judge ruled inadmissible new forensic evidence due to it being introduced too late for the defence team to respond. The forensic evidence showed that the spots of blood found on Siôn's clothing also contained small fragments of Billie-Jo's bone and flesh, which appeared to disprove his claim that the blood had got there from her breathing out onto him as she died. It was this claim that had previously won Jenkins his re-trial. The forensic examination also found that the bloodspots contained tiny fragments of metal from the murder weapon, an iron tent peg. In January 2022, it was announced that police were re-examining the forensic evidence.

Her killing is one of Britain's most high-profile unsolved murders.

== Background ==
Billie-Jo Jenkins was originally brought up in East London. Her father was imprisoned and her mother was unable to cope on her own, so Jenkins was placed in foster care from the age of nine with Siôn and Lois Jenkins, who coincidentally had the same surname as her. The couple already had four daughters of their own. She moved with the family to Hastings on the East Sussex coast, where she attended Helenswood School. She had been living with the Jenkins family for five years before the incident. She was described as a "fun-loving" child who wanted to become an actor.

The children of Siôn Jenkins and friends of Billie-Jo said that Siôn had been violent as they grew up and had used corporal punishment against them. Two schoolfriends of Billie-Jo said that she had confided in them that Siôn had punched her and scratched her neck, and that on one occasion she had come to school with blood on her face, saying that Jenkins had held her up against a door after she had told him to stop slapping her pet dog. The schoolfriends also reported that on multiple occasions she would come to school with bruises on her arms and legs, claiming they were from arguments with her father. They testified that Billie-Jo had once written "Hate" on her knuckles and "I hate my dad (Sion)".

Jenkins would later admit slapping Billie-Jo in anger, and then revealed that he occasionally hit the children with a slipper or with a ruler. His wife Lois also described his "vein-popping" anger when he lost his temper with Billie-Jo. Family friends also stated that Billie-Jo had once been kicked aggressively in the ankle by Siôn while on holiday in France in August 1996, despite her ankle being sprained at the time.

Siôn Jenkins worked as the deputy headteacher of local boys' comprehensive William Parker School in Hastings. It later materialised that he had lied about his qualifications on his CV to get this job, and had recently repeated the lies on a new application to become the head of the school, which was being processed. He had previously been suspended from his school as a teenager due to behavioural issues.

Jenkins had stood as a Conservative Party candidate in local elections.

== Murder ==
On 14 February 1997, Siôn and Lois Jenkins had argued over Billie-Jo, whom Siôn would later describe to police as "difficult." After arriving home from a trip the next day, Siôn said he asked Billie-Jo to turn down her music and evidence later indicated he had been infuriated when she had refused. She had been painting the patio doors at the family home, 48 Lower Park Road in Hastings, East Sussex, that afternoon, but Jenkins found she had got paint on the windows and said later that her painting was "a mess."

Shortly after this, the body of 13-year-old Billie-Jo was found in the back garden of the house. She had been battered over the head with an iron tent peg five times while painting the patio doors. The tent peg had been left out on the patio earlier in the day by one of the other children in the family. Billie-Jo died within minutes of the assault.

Police asked her foster father Siôn Jenkins to make a public appeal, although shortly after this he came under suspicion, including from his wife, and became the main suspect. He had been the last person to see her alive and the first adult to find her body. On 24 February, he was arrested on suspicion of murder. He originally claimed he had not been at the house at the time, before admitting that he had been there that afternoon. He was charged with murder on 14 March.

Siôn told police that he found Billie-Jo in a pool of blood on the patio. A police investigation revealed erratic behaviour by him around the time of the incident and the discovery of 158 microscopic spots of Billie-Jo's blood, found on his clothing. On the day of the murder, Siôn was driving two of his natural daughters home from a clarinet lesson. Billie-Jo had stayed at home to paint the patio doors in the rear garden, in order to earn extra pocket money. According to the police, Jenkins launched the assault on her when he returned home, while his two other daughters waited in the car outside the front of the house. He then returned to the car and took the two girls to a nearby DIY store, yet took no money with him.

Police say that he did this to provide himself with an alibi, supported by the fact that he inexplicably drove around the nearby park in a circle and had taken an unusual route which extended the journey time. Siôn claimed that they had gone to buy some more white spirit, despite the fact he already had some in his garage. He said that when he returned, he found Billie-Jo dead. Police said that the idea that a stranger broke into the garden, found a weapon and killed Billie-Jo during the same 10 minutes Jenkins was away, apparently escaping without anyone noticing, was implausible.

Jenkins' subsequent behaviour raised further suspicion. While his foster daughter lay in a pool of blood inside, he went outside to raise the roof on his convertible car.

— Tonight with Trevor McDonald (2006)

Police also discovered that Siôn had displayed other bizarre behaviour after the murder. Inexplicably, the first thing he did after finding Billie-Jo dead on the patio was to go back to his car to close the roof on his convertible. Detectives believed that he did this so he could later explain why blood might have been found there afterwards, since he had apparently murdered Billie-Jo and been spattered with blood before getting into his car and driving to the DIY store. By doing this he had also delayed calling 999, only doing so when told to by a neighbour. After finding Billie-Jo, he had not used the telephone next to her to call an ambulance. When he eventually did call 999, he refused to put Billie-Jo in the recovery position or check if she was breathing like the operator had instructed, and when asked if she was breathing responded "I don't know, I haven't looked". It was later alleged that this was because he knew she was already dead and "beyond help" as he had been the one who had murdered her. Only minutes after finding Billie-Jo, Siôn also answered the door to a visiting colleague without telling him anything was wrong. Siôn's conflicting accounts also were called into question; at first he told police that he had never entered the house when returning from the clarinet lesson, but later admitted that he had. Police believed that he may have changed his accounts when he realised that his two other daughters would give differing versions of events. He told the operator when he called 999 that he had been at the DIY store for 35–45 minutes, but it later emerged that it had only been around 10 minutes.

After her murder, Billie-Jo had been found with a piece of plastic bin-liner in her nose. This came from plastic material Siôn had left out on the patio for Billie-Jo to help with her painting. There was also a bucket of water by the murdered girl that the other daughters had been using to clean the car outside the front of the house. Police believed this had been taken to the patio at the back of the house by Siôn.

== Legal proceedings against Siôn Jenkins ==
=== First trial ===
At his trial in 1998, the prosecution revealed that 158 bloodstains were found on the shoes, trousers and jacket of Siôn, and stated that this was impact spatter resulting from the assault on Billie-Jo. Forensic scientists had told the police that they believed the pattern of the blood was the result of impact spatter. The bloodstains had the appearance of a fine spray, and two expert scientific witnesses stated that the appearance and distribution of the pattern was consistent with the suggestion that Siôn was the attacker. Both agreed that it was "typical" of the fine backspatter one would find on an assailant when a weapon impacted with an already bloodied surface. The defence called on two of their own scientific witnesses, yet both stated that the evidence was "not inconsistent" with Siôn being the attacker.

Siôn claimed that any blood found on his clothing was as a result of him trying to help her. However, forensic experts said that similar stains were not found on both of the paramedics or the neighbour who had tried to save her, and that in fact no blood had been found on their clothing at all. The defence carried out experiments to try and prove that the blood could have got onto him from Billie-Jo breathing out onto him as she died.

However, one paediatrician called the defence "impossible" and the pathologist concluded that her injuries would have been so severe that she would not have been physically able to take the breaths to be able to do this and described the experiments as "wholly unrealistic". He stated that she would have had to have inhaled 2.2 litres of air to be able to exhale forcefully enough for the blood to spatter, and said this was "highly unlikely". He stated that, if this was the case, she would have clearly been seen to have been still breathing, which no witness says she was. Ultimately, he concluded:

...the possibility of spraying of droplets by breathing to be so remote that it can be discounted.

Siôn claimed at trial that Billie-Jo could be disobedient and "impatient", stating: "She would simply destroy items of clothing or hurt herself, ripping the heads off dolls... if she was asked to do something she might not do it. And if she did something she might become impatient."

The court also heard of the lies Siôn had conceived on his CV at trial, and it was said that he was under "considerable stress" at the time, since he would have been dismissed if his qualifications were found to be fabricated. His new job was due to start the next September. Jenkins had claimed that he had obtained ten O-levels in 1973, but in fact had obtained only three grade C O-levels in art, English and history, one D grade in arithmetic and E grades in French and physics. He also had claimed he had a teacher qualification in English with drama, but in fact it was in physical education, and had claimed he had attended the University of London when he had actually attended the less prestigious University of East London.

Jenkins was convicted of the murder on 2 July 1998 by unanimous decision, despite the jury being told by the judge that a majority verdict alone would be enough for a conviction. He was sentenced to life imprisonment. The judge concluded he was "a danger to the community". The detective superintendent in charge of the case, Jeremy Paine, said that the murder was "a brutal act carried out in a moment of incomprehensible rage and violence". The police surgeon who had certified Billie-Jo's death said that in his 26 years as a surgeon that it was "without doubt the saddest and most brutal murder I have ever attended".

==== Second charge ====
After he had been convicted of the murder, the judge revealed that Jenkins had also been charged with "obtaining pecuniary advantage by deception", relating to the lies he had conceived about his qualifications when applying for his job. The charge was ordered to remain on file.

=== Failed first appeal ===
After his conviction, Siôn appealed, claiming that the blood on his clothes had been sprayed onto him as Billie-Jo breathed out as she died. The judge at his appeal in 1999 disagreed and concluded that even if Billie-Jo had been able to breathe out as she lay dying, "blood spattering would not reach the height on the appellant's clothing at which spattering was found". The appeal was duly dismissed.

Investigative journalist Bob Woffinden believed that it was a miscarriage of justice.

=== CCRC involvement and successful appeal ===
The Criminal Cases Review Commission investigated the case, and heard evidence again from a scientific witness called by the defence whose conclusions had been rejected during the 1999 appeal. The witness claimed that the blood stains could have resulted from a rare condition which would have caused gases build up in Billie-Jo's lungs, supposedly causing her to breathe out blood involuntarily. The CCRC referred the case back to the Court of Appeal in 2004.

The appeal court regarded this alternative explanation as making the conviction unsafe, stating it may have affected the decision of the jury had it been discussed at the first trial. The appeal was allowed but a retrial was ordered, with Jenkins being released on bail.

=== Retrials ===
At the retrial in 2005, forensic scientists stated that the microscopic blood spray could conceivably have been released from Billie Jo's injured airway as Jenkins moved her. The jury was unable to come to a majority verdict after 39 hours of deliberating and a second retrial was ordered.

At the second retrial, the prosecution stated that the jury would have to decide whether the blood on Jenkins got there when she was attacked or when he discovered her body. It was also noted that Jenkins could have been in a flirtatious, sexualised relationship with his foster daughter at the time, and that evidence from his other children suggested that he "preferred" Billie-Jo to them. The second retrial was likewise unable to reach a majority verdict after three months of evidence, and at the Old Bailey in London on 9 February 2006, Siôn Jenkins was declared in consequence to be acquitted. The Crown Prosecution Service indicated that no further retrials of Jenkins would be sought. He became the first man in British criminal history to be acquitted after being tried three times for the same crime.

The police investigation, trials and appeals are estimated to have cost £10m. Seven hundred witness statements were taken by the police, and jurors spent 36 days deliberating in three trials. Jenkins spent 11 days in the witness box giving evidence.

=== Controversy over evidence not admitted ===
Jenkins' acquittal was controversial, as it then emerged that the jury had not heard evidence from his wife at the time, who described him as a violent man who had beaten the children with a stick and had previously injured her. She claimed that he had once hit her so hard she received a perforated eardrum, and said that it was a violent marriage. She also claimed that he was highly volatile and was quick to anger. Jenkins denied he had ever hit his children or his wife in the press, but his children then responded by claiming that their father was lying and had used corporal punishment against them.

Also highly controversial was the final retrial judge's decision to disallow new forensic evidence which showed that the bloodstains on Jenkins' clothing also contained small fragments of Billie-Jo's bone and flesh, which appeared to indicate it had got there as a result of Jenkins beating her. The scientific evidence, conducted by scientists from the University of Cambridge, also found that the bloodstains contained tiny fragments of metal from the tent peg which had been used to beat her. The reason given for this evidence not being admitted was that it had been introduced too late for the defence to respond. The biological family of Billie-Jo, who always maintained Jenkins was guilty, blamed the outcome of the trial on this and vowed to "fight on" in order to get Jenkins re-convicted.

== Other potential suspects ==
Around the time of the murder, a mentally ill man was allegedly seen in the street and area. He was taken into custody, but considered to be unable to be questioned. Jenkins said that he and his wife Lois were "so worried about prowlers and break-ins in the area where they lived that they had security lights and window locks fitted to their home". At his appeal in 2004 Jenkins' legal team submitted to the court that this unidentified man could have been responsible for the murder; however, the court firmly rejected this claim, finding that there was no evidence that this alleged suspect had killed Billie-Jo and that forensic and identification evidence in fact indicated the opposite.

Jenkins' defence team had already been aware of the 'evidence' regarding this alleged suspect at trial, but had not raised it due to "tactical considerations". The man had a confirmed alibi, as police found that witnesses put him at least 15 minutes away from the house at the crucial moment. It would not have been possible for him to have got to the house from the location he was last seen at by witnesses in time to murder Billie-Jo.

Siôn said Billie-Jo was alive and well before he set off on his 10-minute trip to the DIY store with his two other daughters, and she was found dead as soon as he came back. This meant that any third-party murderer would have had to have broken into the garden, found a weapon and killed Billie-Jo during the same 10 minutes Jenkins was away, and then escaped without anyone noticing. Police said this idea was implausible.

== Subsequent events ==
After Jenkins was formally acquitted, Sussex Police stated that they "had resolutely sought justice for Billie-Jo". Since the acquittal the force have maintained that there are no plans to re-open the murder investigation. Despite this, on 31 January 2022, a forensic review of the case was announced by Sussex Police.

After he was released from prison, Jenkins moved to Lymington, Hampshire with his new wife Christina Ferneyhough. Soon after his acquittal for murder, he enrolled on a criminology course at the University of Portsmouth. In 2008, he applied for £500,000 worth of compensation for his imprisonment, but his application was rejected and he said he would not appeal. The reason given for the refusal of compensation by the Ministry of Justice was that there was no evidence that conclusively proved his innocence.

On 31 January 2022, a forensic review of the case was announced by Sussex Police, although it was revealed that the wider investigation was not being re-opened.

In a February 2022 Channel 5 documentary on the case, members of the police investigative team stated that Jenkins continued to lie in a book he wrote on the murder after his acquittal. In the book Jenkins had claimed that he had been forced to sign police statements that he had never read, but officers said he had meticulously read every written summary of interviews after they had concluded, and constantly made his own notes during the interviews.

== Memorial seat ==
On 19 January 2008, in Alexandra Park, Hastings, a memorial seat made from a locally felled oak tree by local artist Joc Hare, was dedicated to the memory of Billie-Jo. The first few words on the seat read, "Side by side or miles apart, friends are close to the heart."

== In popular culture ==
In 1999, the murder of Billie-Jo was examined in an episode of Channel 4's highly-regarded documentary series Trial and Error. The documentary has never been repeated and there are currently no public copies.

In May 2002, Jenkins' case briefly featured in an episode of ITV's Real Crime series, which specifically focused on notable cases of "crocodile tears".

After the conclusion of his second retrial in 2006, Jenkins appeared in an extended interview on a special episode of Tonight with Trevor McDonald. Among the subjects Jenkins was questioned on were the claims of Jenkins' former wife that he committed domestic abuse against her and the family. This was the first time he publicly answered questions on this subject.

After the announcement of a review of the forensic evidence in Billie-Jo's murder on the 25-year anniversary of the killing in 2022, Channel 5 released a two-hour documentary on the case titled Who Killed Billie-Jo?. It featured interviews with the officers who led and worked on the case.

== See also ==
- List of miscarriage of justice cases in the United Kingdom

== General and cited sources ==
- Adam, Craig (2016). "Bloodstain Pattern Analysis". Forensic Evidence in Court: Evaluation and Scientific Opinion. Chichester, UK: John Wiley & Sons Limited. pp. 277–292.
