= Arimazes =

4th century Sogdian tribal chief

Arimazes (Ancient Greek: Ἀριμάζης) or Ariomazes (Ancient Greek: Ἀριομάζης), was a chief who had possession, in 328 BCE, of a very strong fortress in Sogdiana, usually called the Rock of Ariamazes, which the historian Johann Gustav Droysen identifies with a place called Kohiten, situated near the pass of Kolugha or Derbend.

Arimazes at first refused to surrender the place to Alexander the Great, but afterwards yielded when some of the Macedonians had climbed to the summit. In this fortress Alexander found Roxana, the daughter of the Bactrian chief, Oxyartes, whom he made his wife. The first century historian Quintus Curtius Rufus relates that Alexander crucified Arimazes and the leading men who were taken; but this is not mentioned by the Greek historian Arrian in his account or Polyaenus, and is improbable.
