= Timothy Booth Jones =

English cricketer

Personal information
- Full name: Timothy Douglas Booth Jones
- Born: 6 August 1952 (age 74); Dover, Kent, England
- Nickname: TBJ, Marty
- Height: 5 ft 11 in (1.80 m)
- Batting: Right-handed

Domestic team information
- Years: Team
- 1980–1981: Sussex

Career statistics
Competition	First-class	List A
Matches	26	10
Runs scored	1,034	110
Batting average	24.04	13.75
100s/50s	–/7	–/–
Top score	95	30
Balls bowled	–	–
Wickets	–	–
Bowling average	–	–
5 wickets in innings	–	–
10 wickets in match	–	–
Best bowling	–	–
Catches/stumpings	8/–	1/–
- Source: Cricinfo, 3 January 2012

Timothy Douglas Booth Jones (born 6 August 1952) is a former English cricketer. Booth Jones was a right-handed batsman. He was born at Dover, Kent, and was educated at Hastings Grammar School, before attending St Luke's, Exeter. He now teaches history at a school in Tunbridge Wells.

Booth Jones made his first-class debut for Sussex against Kent in the 1980 County Championship. Booth Jones made 25 further first-class appearances for Sussex, the last of which came against Kent in the 1981 County Championship. In his 26 first-class appearances, he scored a total of 1,034 runs at an average of 24.04, with a high score of 95. This score was one of seven fifties he made and came against Somerset in 1981. He made his List A debut against Yorkshire in the 1980 John Player League. He made nine further List A appearances for Sussex, the last of which came against Leicestershire in the 1981 Benson & Hedges Cup. In his ten List A matches, he scored a total of 110 runs at an average of 13.75, with a high score of 30.
