= Siege of the Sogdian Rock =

Alexander the Great's siege of Sogdian fortress (327 BC)

- Part of the Wars of Alexander the Great
Date	327 BC
Location	Sogdiana, present-day Tajikistan 40.4°N 69.4°E
Result	Macedonian victory
Territorial changes	Alexander captures Sogdiana

Belligerents
Macedon; League of Corinth	Sogdiana

Commanders and leaders
Alexander the Great	Arimazes

Strength
300	Unknown

Casualties and losses
30	Presumably none
- Location of the Sogdian Rock

Alexander the Great
current battle

The Sogdian Rock or Rock of Ariamazes, a fortress located north of Bactria in Sogdiana (near Samarkand), ruled by Arimazes, was captured by the forces of Alexander the Great in the early spring of 327 BC as part of his conquest of the Achaemenid Empire. (Note: Sogdian Rock was located in the northern hemisphere so this would have been in the first quarter of 327 BC.)

== Background ==
Oxyartes of Bactria had sent his wife and daughters, one of whom was Roxane, to take refuge in the fortress, as it was thought to be impregnable, and was provisioned for a long siege.

When Alexander asked the defenders to surrender, they refused, telling him that he would need "men with wings" to capture it.

== Siege ==
Alexander asked for volunteers, whom he would reward if they could climb the cliffs under the fortress. There were some 300 men who from previous sieges had gained experience in rock-climbing. Using tent pegs and strong flaxen lines, they climbed the cliff face at night, losing about 30 of their number during the ascent. In accordance with Alexander's orders, they signalled their success to the troops below by waving bits of linen, and Alexander sent a herald to tell the defenders that if they looked up, they would see that he had found his winged men. The defenders were so surprised and demoralised by this that they surrendered, even though they outnumbered the mountaineers by a hundred to one and Alexander's main force still had no way to reach the summit. The defenders had thought that the Rock was impregnable, and with one bold stroke Alexander showed them how wrong they were. The enemy's quick surrender validated Alexander's insightful use of psychological warfare.

== Aftermath ==
Alexander is said to have fallen in love with Roxane on sight. The Macedonians claimed that Roxane was "the loveliest woman they had seen in Asia, with the one exception of Darius' wife".

From Sogdian Rock, Alexander advanced into Parsetakene which contained another supposedly impregnable craggy fortress known as the Rock of Chorienes, but it was no match for Alexander and it was soon captured. From there Alexander went to Bactra while he sent Craterus with a division of the Macedonian army to complete the pacification of Parsetakene. Alexander remained at Bactra, preparing for his expedition across the Hindu-Kush into India. It was while in Bactra that he married Roxana.

== Historiography ==
The story of the siege of the Sogdian Rock is told in many histories, but it is based on the history written by the Greek historian Arrian of Nicomedia, in his Anabasis (section 4.18.4-19.6). However P. J. Rhodes points out that "this version [of events] produces a very empty 328 and a very full early 327, so we should probably prefer the alternative tradition. In this second tradition instead of the Sogdian Rock and the Rock of Chorienes the same stratagems are used against the Rock of Arimazes and the Rock of Sisimithres in the summer of 328".
