= Walter Lawson (RAF officer) =

British flying ace of WWII

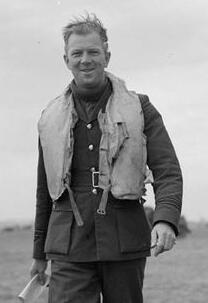
- Lawson, September 1940
- Born: January 1913; Taunton, United Kingdom
- Died: 28 August 1941 (aged 28) off the Dutch Coast
- Military career
- Allegiance: United Kingdom
- Branch: Royal Air Force
- Service years: 1934–1941 †
- Rank: Squadron Leader
- Nickname: 'Farmer'
- Commands: No. 19 Squadron
- Conflicts: Second World War: Operation Dynamo; Battle of Britain; Circus offensive
- Awards: Distinguished Flying Cross

Walter Lawson, DFC (January 1913 – 28 August 1941) was an flying ace who served in the Royal Air Force (RAF) during the Second World War. During his service with the RAF, he was credited with at least six aerial victories.

Born in Taunton, Lawson enlisted in the RAF in 1929 and qualified as a fitter two years later. In 1936, he commenced pilot training and after gaining his wings, was posted to No. 46 Squadron. He saw little action in the Second World War until he was transferred to No. 19 Squadron in April 1940. He flew extensively in the later stages of the Battle of Britain, during which he achieved a number of aerial victories. In July 1941, he became commander of the squadron but was killed on operations the following month, aged 28.

== Early life ==
Walter John Lawson, known as Jack, was born in January 1913 in the Somerset town of Taunton, in the United Kingdom. The son of a British Army officer and his wife, Lawson went to school at Hastings Grammar. He enlisted in the Royal Air Force (RAF) in January 1929 as an apprentice, training as an aircraft fitter, a trade in which he qualified in late 1931. He subsequently decided to train as a pilot and in March 1936, commenced flight training at No. 10 Elementary Flying Training School at Yatesbury. Following this, he went to No. 10 Flying Training School at Ternhill and gained his wings.

== Second World War ==
At the time of the outbreak of the Second World War, Lawson was serving with No. 46 Squadron as a sergeant. His new unit was based at Digby as part of No. 12 Group and operated the Hawker Hurricane fighter. Tasked with patrols along the east coast, these were mostly uneventful. In April 1940, Lawson was commissioned as a pilot officer. Later that month he was transferred to No. 19 Squadron, where he soon earned the nickname 'Farmer' on account of this being his intended occupation after the war.

No. 19 Squadron, based at Duxford, was equipped with the Supermarine Spitfire fighter, having been the first unit in the RAF to receive the type in 1938. At the time Lawson joined the squadron, it was mostly engaged in convoy patrols but in late May it was involved in providing aerial cover over the beaches at Dunkirk during Operation Dynamo. The following month it was involved in trials with cannon-equipped Spitfires.

=== Battle of Britain ===
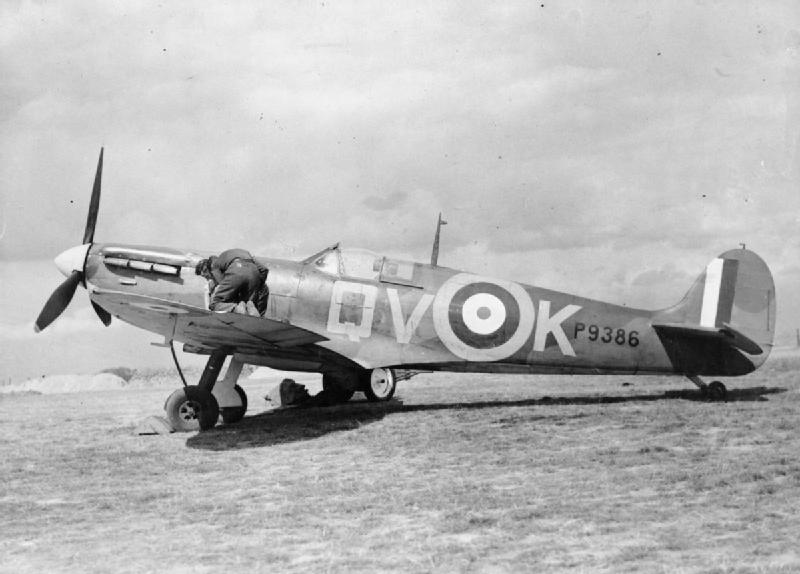
Lawson occasionally flew this Supermarine Spitfire fighter during the period he was a flight commander at No. 19 Squadron

The cannons that equipped the Spitfires of No. 19 Squadron proved to be unreliable, and this affected its operations in the early stages of the Battle of Britain. By the start of September, it had reverted to the standard machine-gun equipment and was regularly flying as part of No. 12 Group's Duxford Wing.

On 5 September, the same day he was promoted to acting flight lieutenant and appointed a flight commander, Lawson engaged and claimed as probably destroyed a Dornier Do 17 medium bomber over the Maidstone region, and also damaged a Messerschmitt Bf 109 fighter. Four days later, to the east of Biggin Hill station, he shot down a Messerschmitt Bf 110 heavy fighter. He destroyed a Heinkel He 111 medium bomber over Gravesend on 11 September. He claimed a Do 17 as probably destroyed over London on 15 September and three days later shared in the destruction of a Junkers Ju 88 medium bomber to the east of London. In an engagement over the Thames Estuary on 27 September he shot down a Bf 109.

The intensity of operations began to reduce from October, with increasingly fewer engagements with the Luftwaffe. However, Lawson destroyed two Bf 109s on 5 November, each accounted for in separate sorties; one was shot down near Dungeness and the other over the Thames Estuary. His successes saw him awarded the Distinguished Flying Cross, the official announcement being made in The London Gazette on 26 November. The published citation read:

Flight Lieutenant Lawson has consistently led his flight, and frequently his squadron, with great skill and courage and has destroyed at least five enemy aircraft. His exceptional coolness inspires great confidence in his fellow pilots. On two occasions he has refused to abandon his aircraft when damage caused would clearly have justified such a course.

— London Gazette, No. 35001, 26 November 1940

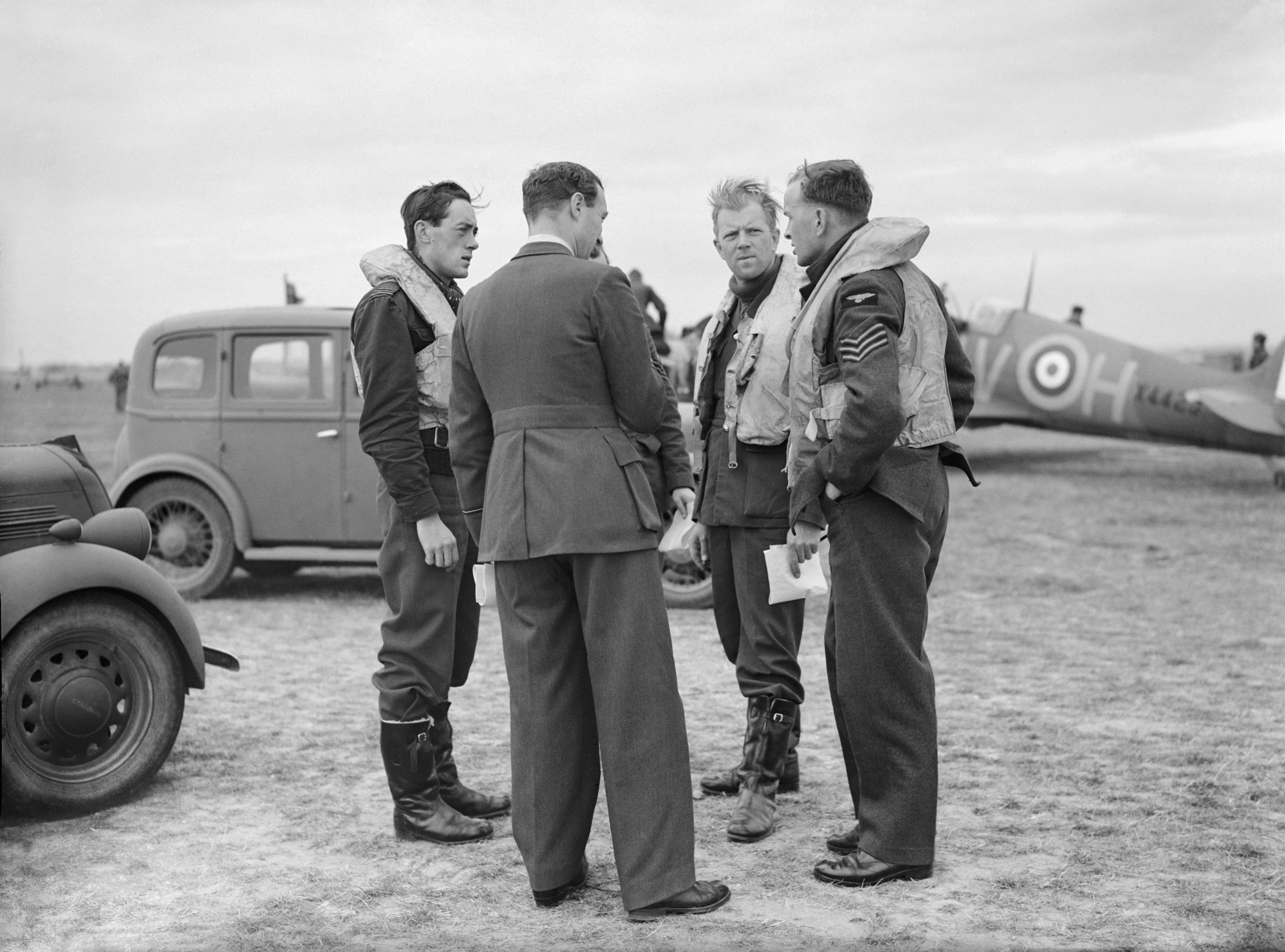
A group of No. 19 Squadron pilots confer after a sortie during the Battle of Britain; Lawson stands facing the camera while the squadron's commander, Brian Lane, stands on the left

Operational tempo remained slow over the winter months, but during this time Lawson received a substantive promotion to flying officer, although he remained as acting flight lieutenant.

=== Circus offensive ===
As the RAF switched away from defensive operations, No. 19 Squadron began flying to France and the Low Countries on fighter sweeps and escorts to bombers as part of Fighter Command's Circus offensive. On one of these, a sortie carried out on 27 June 1941 that targeted a metal works facility in Lille, the squadron was flying in support of 24 Bristol Blenheim light bombers. Spotting several Bf 109s when they flew over the French coast, the squadron engaged them and Lawson subsequently shot one down and claimed another as probably destroyed.

In July, Lawson was promoted squadron leader and given command of No. 19 Squadron. On 28 August, the squadron was part of a fighter sweep mounted by No. 12 Group to Rotterdam. They were surprised by Messerschmitt Bf 109 fighters of Jagdgeschwader 53 (Fighter Wing 53) and during the resulting engagement, Lawson was shot down off the Dutch coast. Although his squadron mounted an aerial search the next day, no trace of him was found and he was presumed to have been killed.

Having no known grave, Lawson is commemorated on the Commonwealth War Graves Commission's Air Forces Memorial near Egham in Surrey, England. At the time of his presumed death, he was credited with having shot down seven German aircraft, one of which shared with three other pilots, and three probably destroyed. He is also credited with damaging one aircraft.
