= David Penry-Davey =

British judge (1942–2015)

Sir David Penry-Davey
- Royal coat of arms of the United Kingdom

Justice of the High Court

Personal details
- Born: 16 May 1942
- Died: 10 October 2015 (aged 73)
- Education: King's College London

Sir David Herbert Penry-Davey (16 May 1942 – 10 October 2015) was a judge of the High Court of England and Wales.

He was educated at Hastings Grammar School and at King's College London (LLB, 1964). He was called to the Bar at Inner Temple in 1965. He was made a Crown Court recorder in 1986, a QC in 1988, and a judge of the High Court of Justice (Queen's Bench Division) in 1997.

He died on 10 October 2015.
