= Tent peg =

Spike for securing a tent

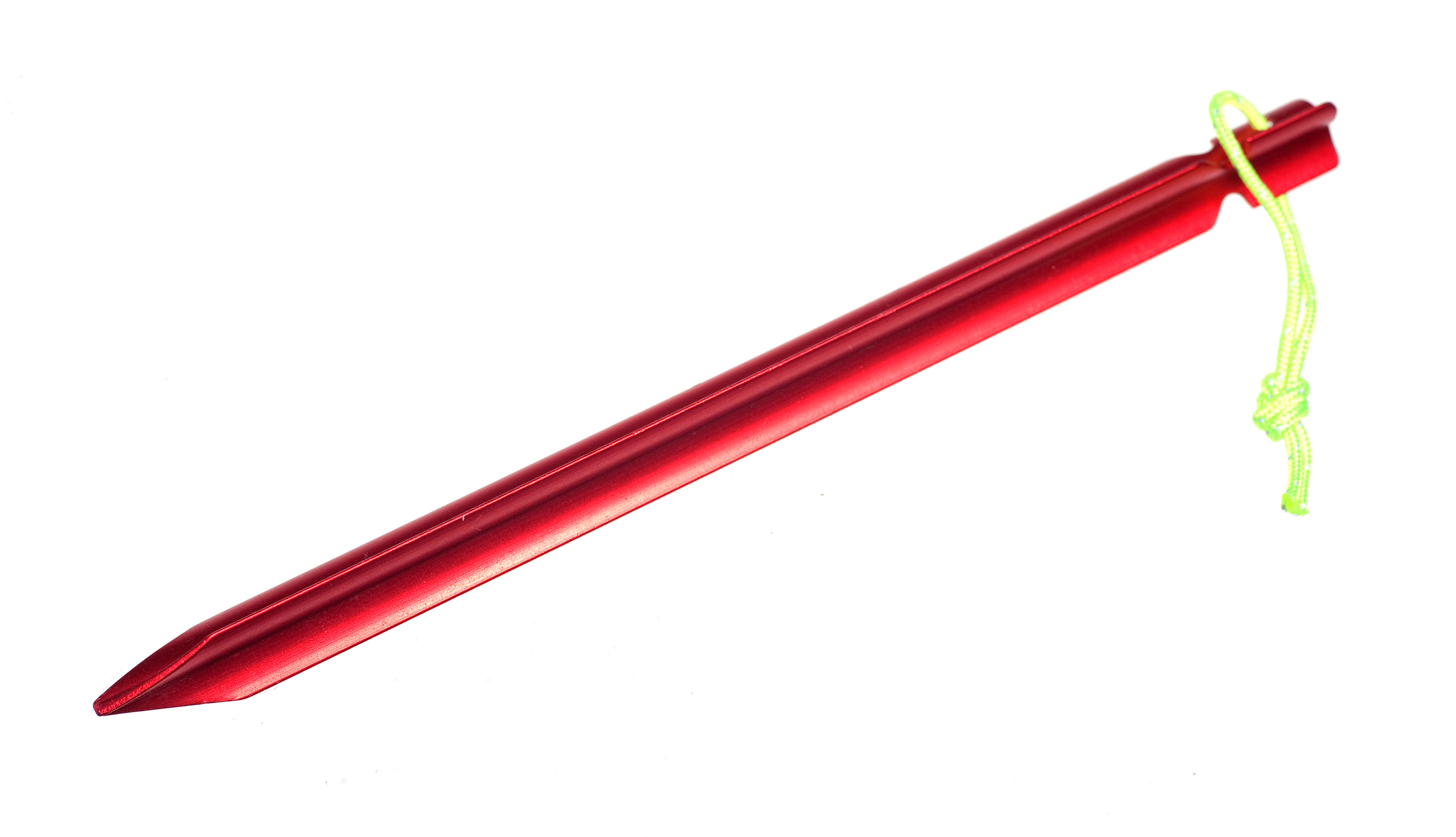
An aluminium tent peg

A tent peg (or tent stake) is a spike, usually with a hook or hole on the top end, typically made from wood, metal, plastic, or composite material, pushed or driven into the ground for holding a tent to the ground, either directly by attaching to the tent's material, or by connecting to ropes attached to the tent. Traditionally, a tent peg is improvised from a section of a small tree branch, if possible with a small side branch cut off to leave a hook, driven into the ground narrower end first.

== Tent peg use ==
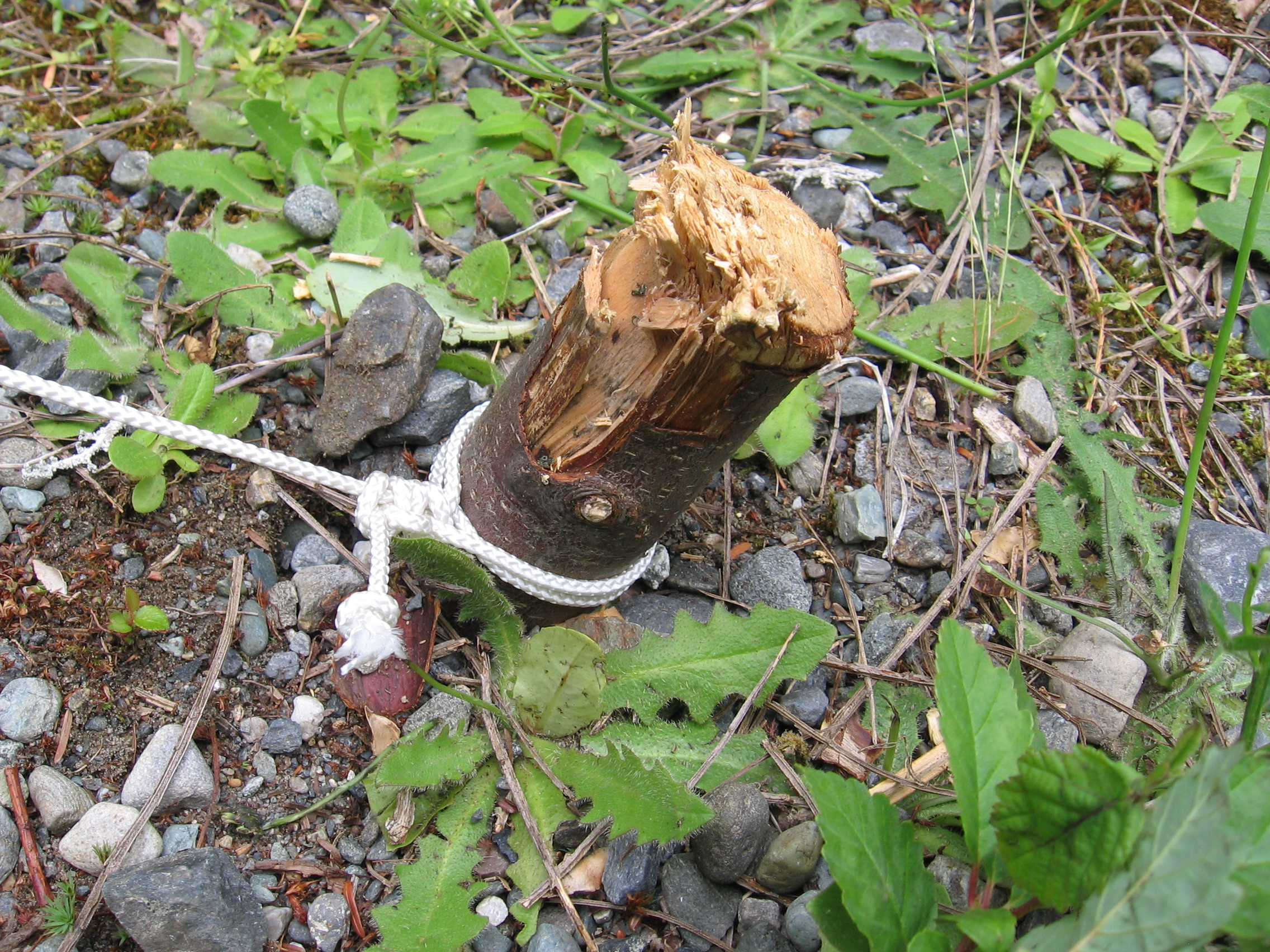
A wooden stake supporting a tent.

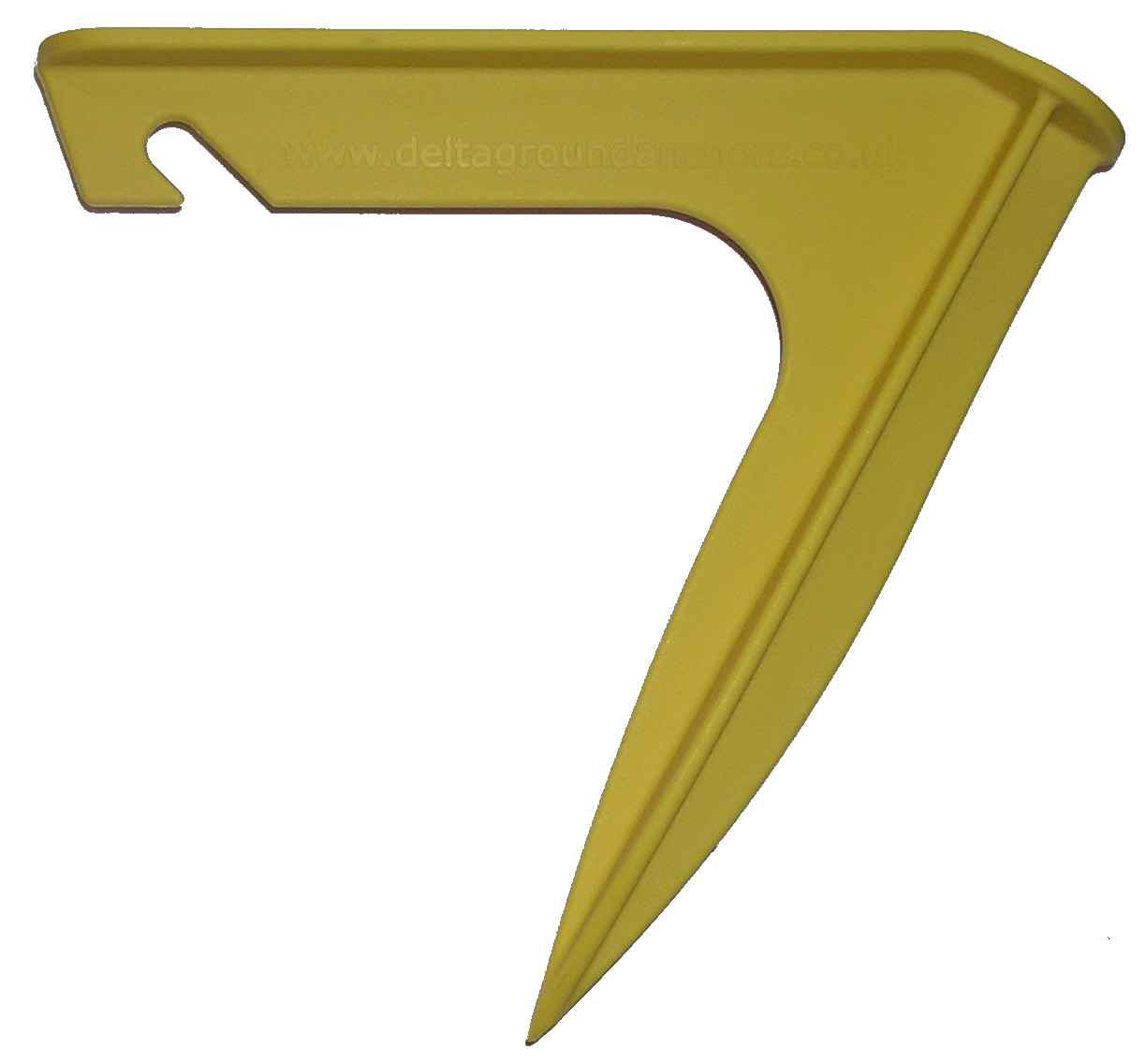
Delta (dog-leg) Peg

A tent will typically be pegged to the ground by a combination of both direct attachment to the tent's material and via ropes.

Tent pegs are used to help maintain the tent's shape, and to hold the tent in place against wind.

Tent pegs are preferably pushed into the ground by hand. However, hard ground, or bigger tent pegs, will require a tent peg mallet to drive them into the ground.

A tent peg provides the greatest holding ability when it is inserted into the ground so that the point of attachment of the rope is at ground level. This minimises the rope's ability to apply leverage to the tent peg, which can loosen or pull the tent peg from the ground.

Above, the emphasis is on leverage and in recent years a new type of tent peg has been developed which eliminates leverage. The addition of an arm at the top of the peg enables the tension to be directed to a point beneath the ground where the soil is firm. The peg is 'balanced' with little or no leverage (moment). This new peg style presents a greater surface area to resist tension in guys.

== Types of tent pegs ==
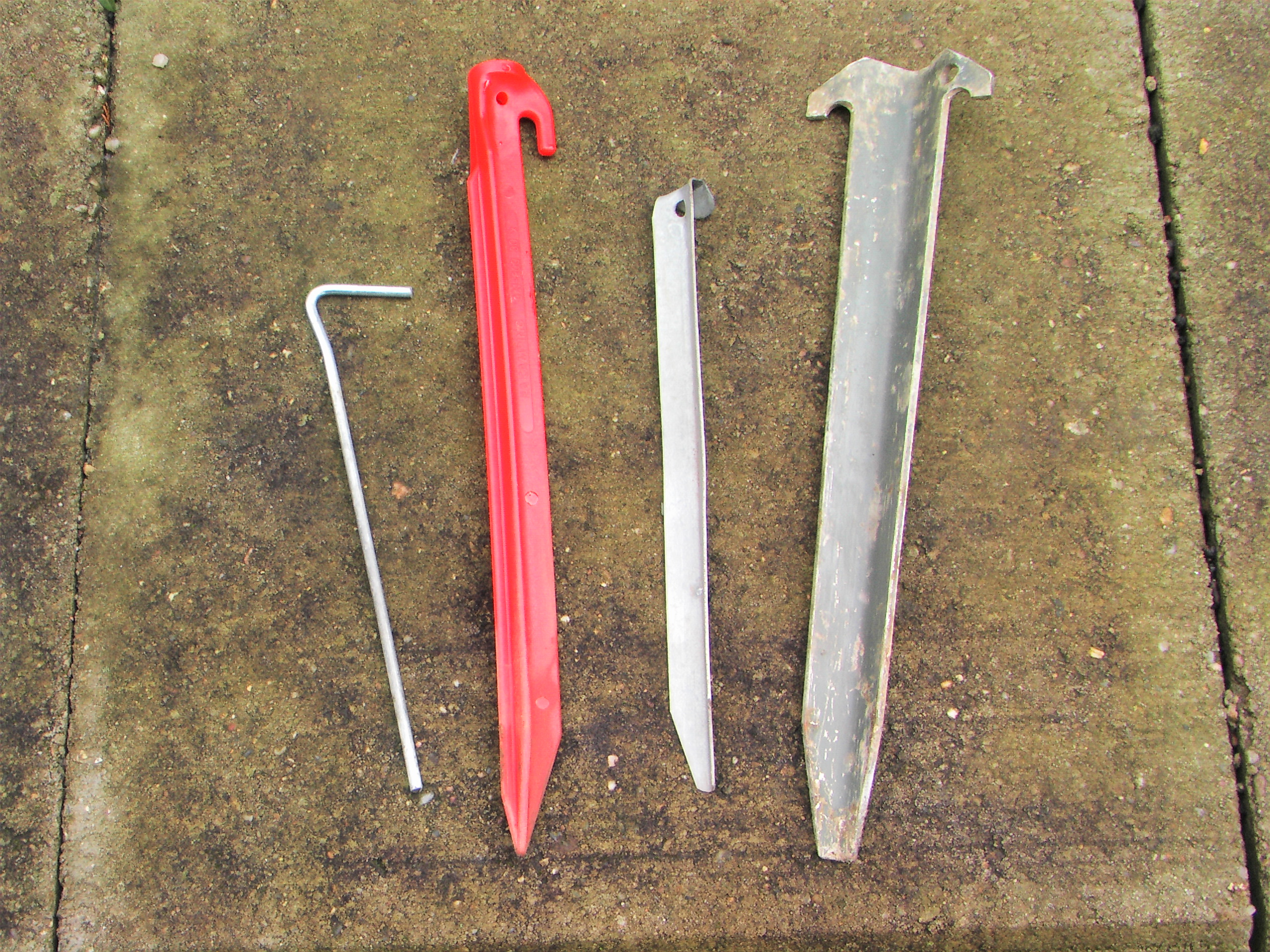
A variety of tent pegs.

Tent pegs come in wide variety of shapes, sizes, and materials.

The type of tent peg best suited to a tent will be determined by several factors, such as:

- the type of ground where the tent is to be used, for example, snow, soft soil, sand, hard or rocky soil, etc., and hence the gripping or holding strength of the ground versus the ease of penetrating the ground
- the size of the tent, and hence the weight of material to be kept in shape, and the wind load
- the weather conditions when the tent is to be used, primarily affecting the wind load on the tent
- the weight of the tent peg, bearing on the ability for the tent to be transported, often in backpacks

=== Characteristics of tent pegs ===
Better quality tent pegs will have symmetrical tips, either conical or V-shaped, to ensure that they can be driven into the ground without veering off alignment. They will also typically have hook extensions to allow the end of the hook to be also driven into the ground, providing a second ground contact point, to reduce the risk that the peg may turn in the ground under tension and allow the rope it is holding to slip off the hook.

Other styles of tent pegs have fully formed eyes through which the rope is passed so that the rope cannot come off the peg no matter which direction the peg is oriented. The Delta (or dog-leg) shape peg always points toward the tent and can never turn. The guy is partially buried and cannot slip off the hook. Delta shaped pegs lie level with the soil offering maximum safety. The rope pulls against the ground rather than levering a straight peg at one end. Metal delta pegs can be springy, absorbing wind shocks.

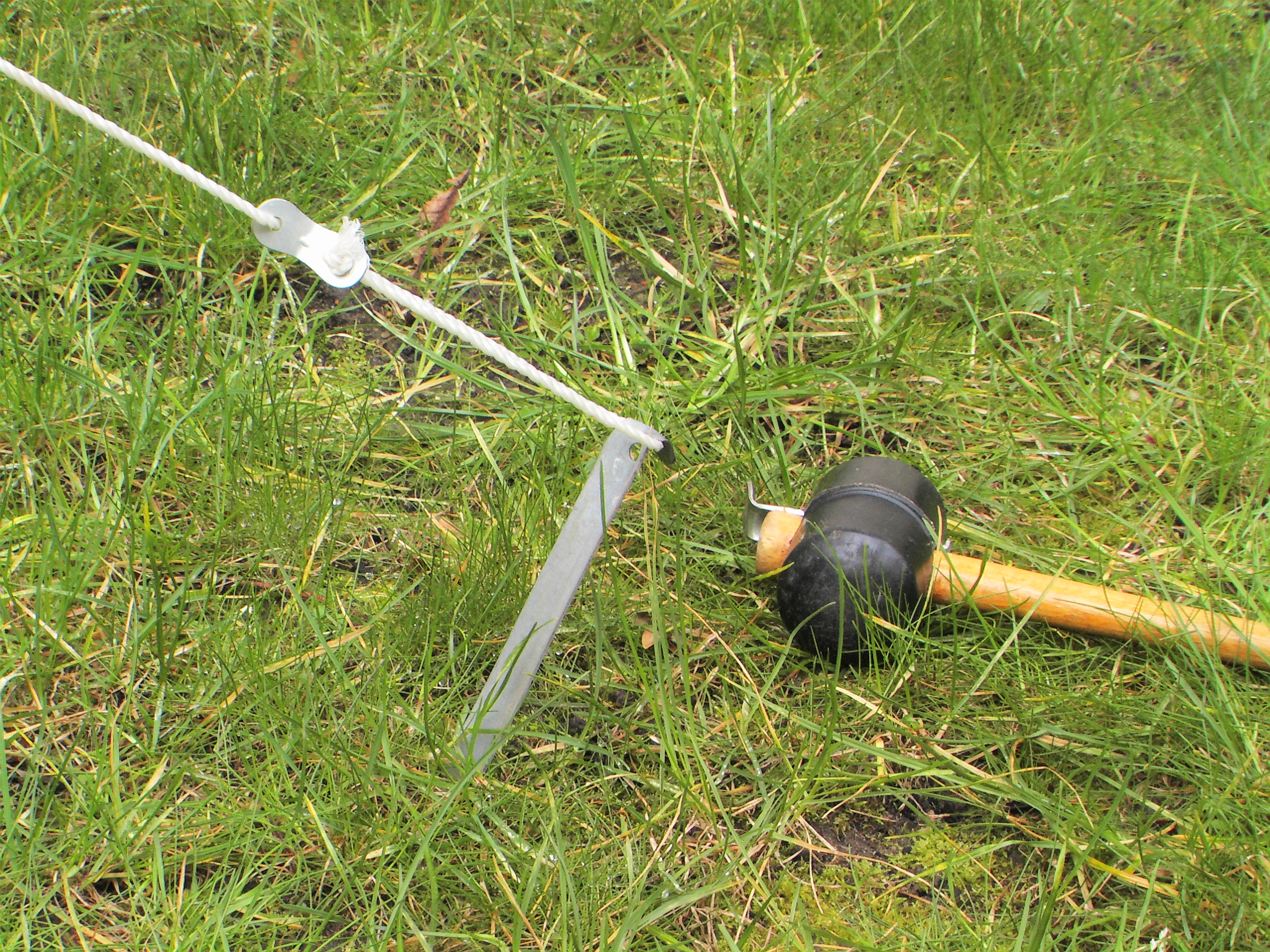
A light gauge pressed metal tent peg, with rope and mallet.

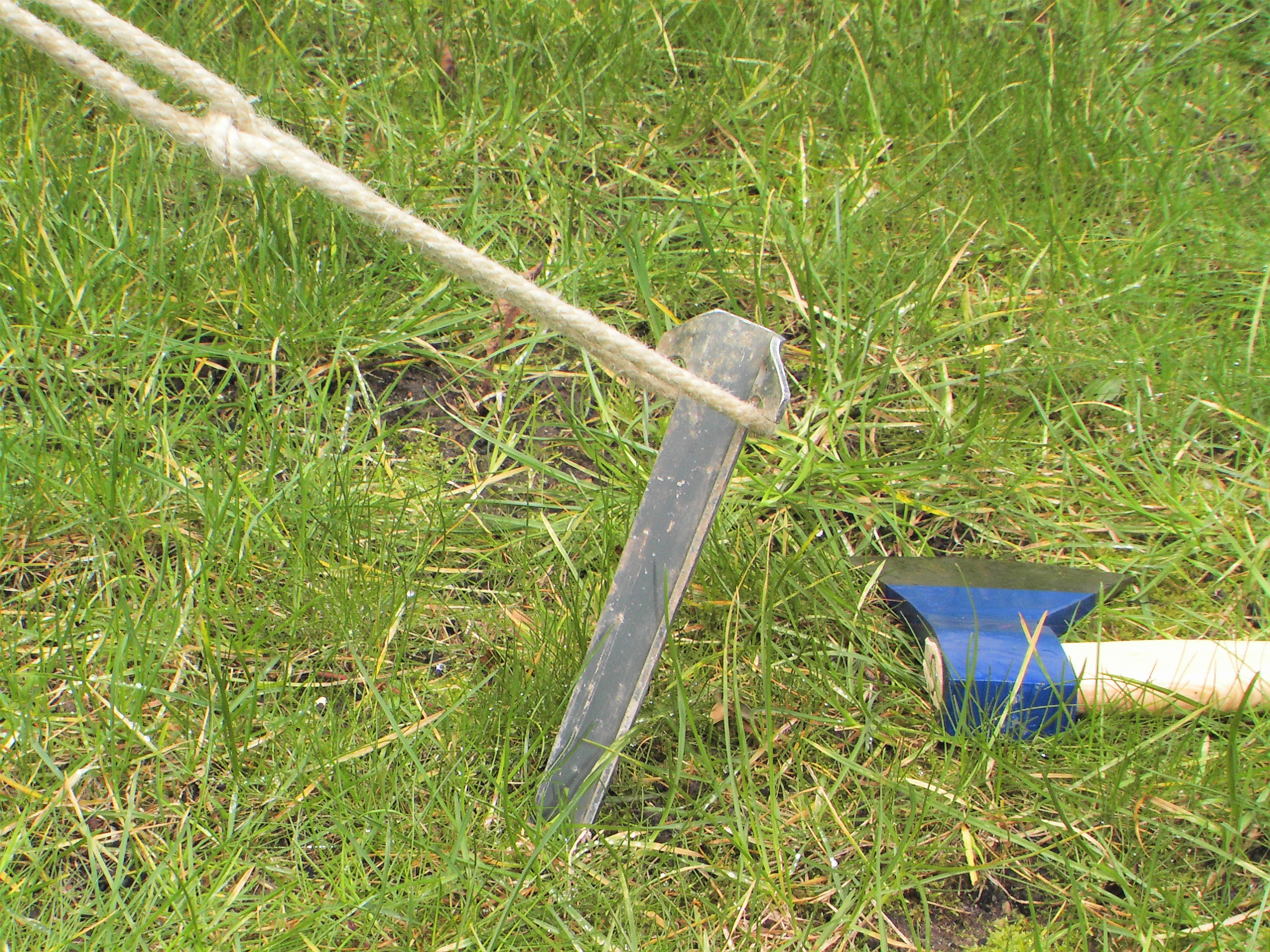
A heavy gauge pressed metal tent peg, with heavier rope and metal hatchet used as a mallet.

A range of tent peg profiles.

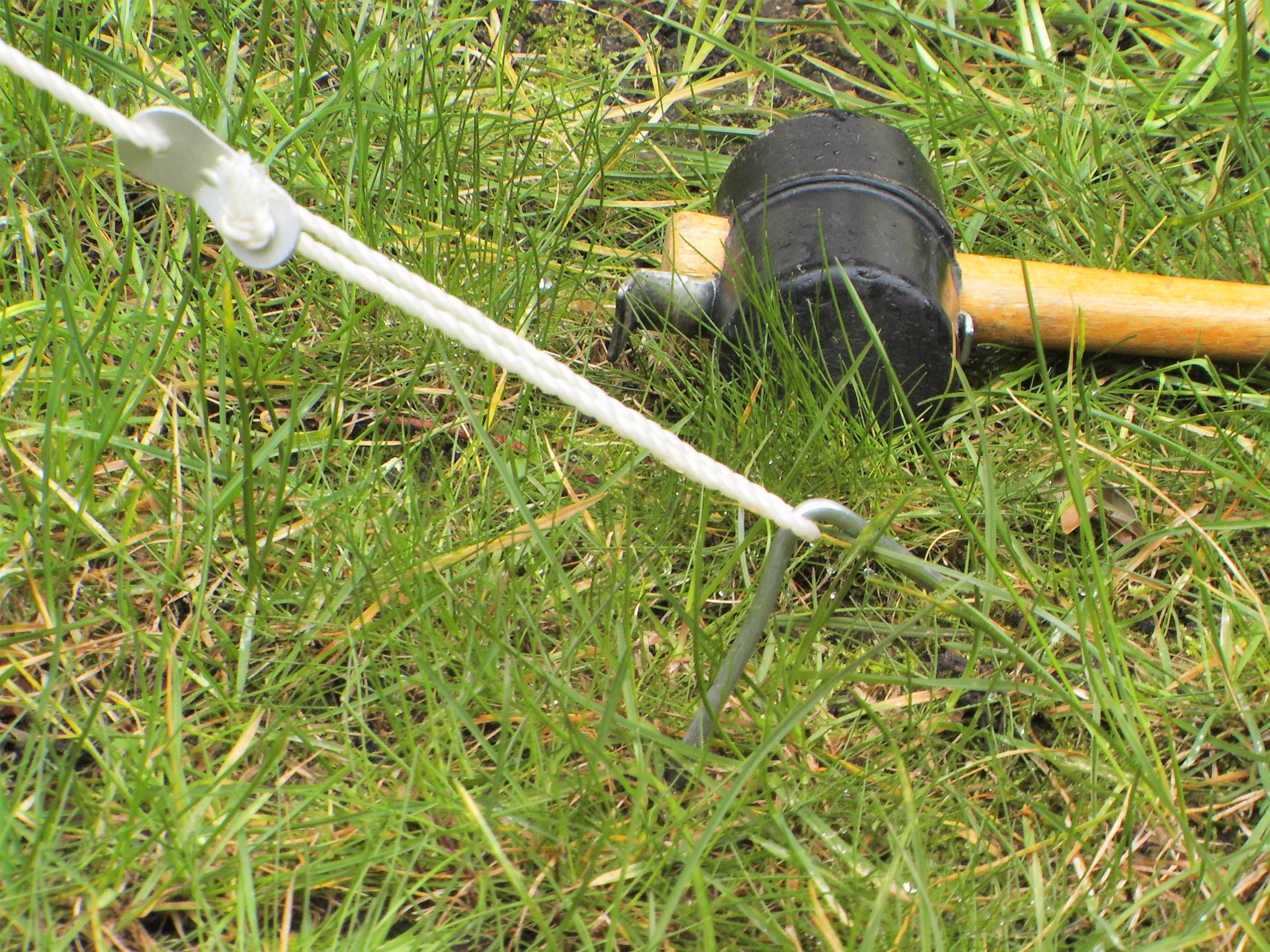
A wire rod tent peg, with rope and mallet.

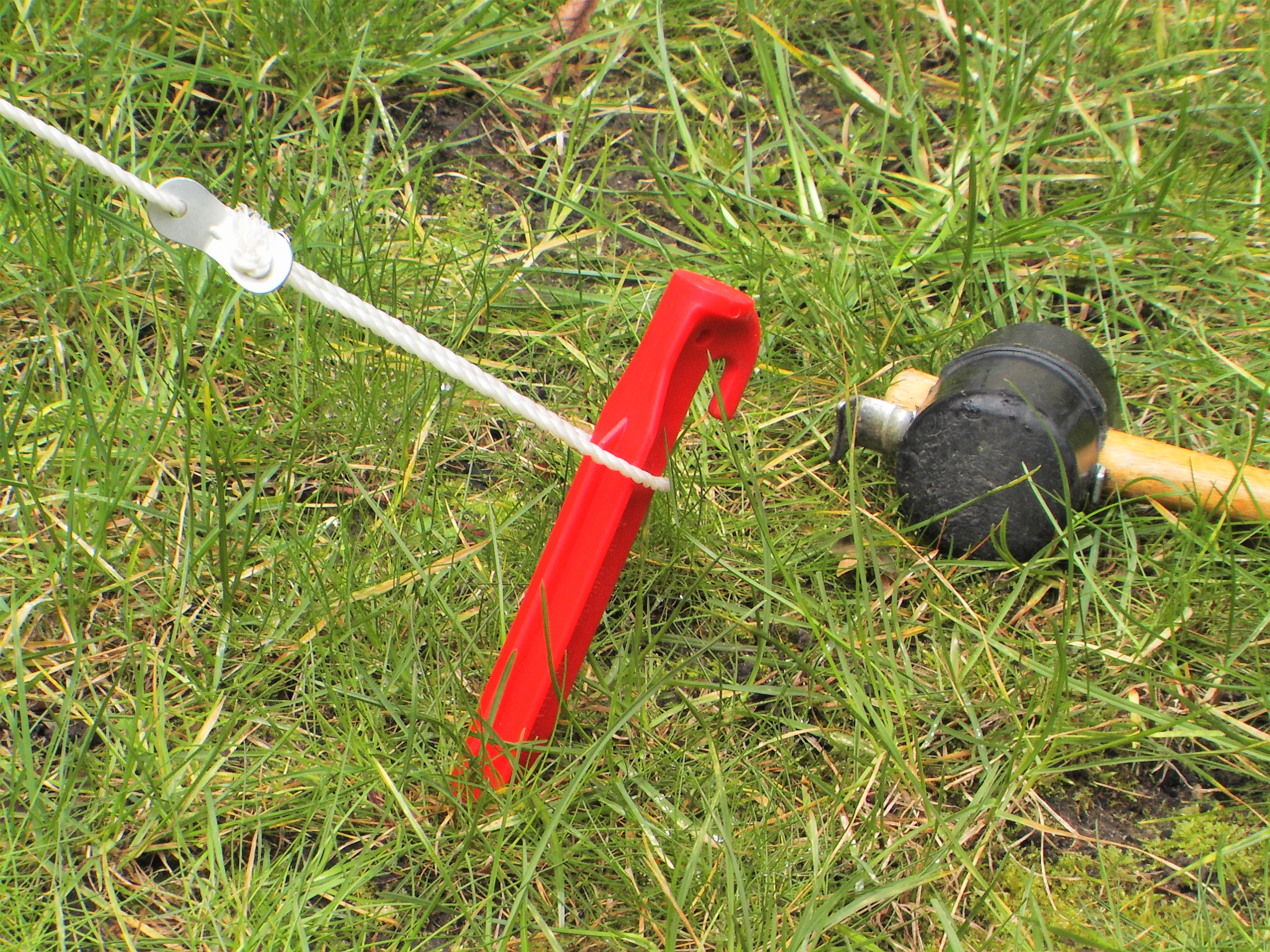
A narrower plastic tent peg in softer soil, with rope and mallet.

Some types of tent pegs are made from flat material pressed into a shallow "V" shape cross section. This type of tent peg relies on the broadness of the section to not turn under tension.

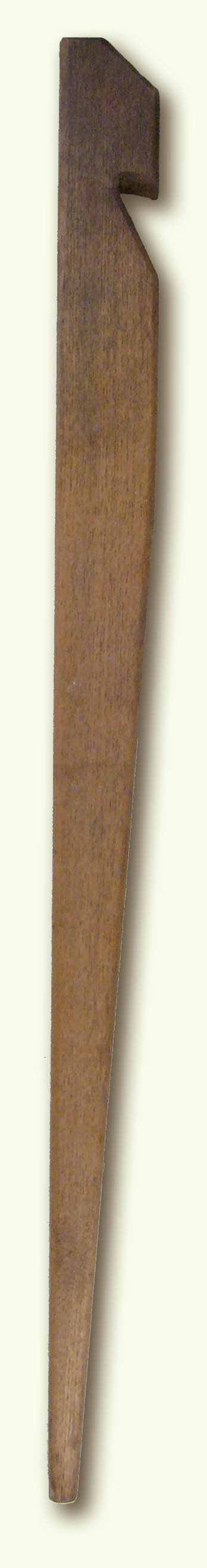
A wooden tent peg used in snow.

Tent peg types and styles may typically vary in length from 150mm to 490mm, and in thickness from 1.6 mm to 3.2 mm for flat section tent pegs and from 4 mm to 11.2 mm for wire rod tent pegs. Smaller wire tent pegs are also available, especially where weight is critical.

Plastic tent pegs are typically very wide and longer than metal pegs, and are used for softer ground types, sand and light soils.

Ultralight U-shaped aluminium alloy tent pegs are used in snow and sand, each peg weighing around 45 g. These pegs can be planted into sand or snow, head outward away from the tent at a 45-degree angle from the ground, with the tent or a guy line attached to the head area. The pegs can also be used by tying the guy lines to the middle hole, laying them flat at the bottom of a hole sand or snow, and then burying them.

Heavy-duty tent pegs may be made from angle iron from 2.5 mm to 5 mm thick, and have the hook welded into the open side of the angle, meaning that the open angle faces the tent, bracing the open angle of the tent peg against the tension.

=== Materials ===
Tent pegs may be manufactured from steel rod or wire, pressed flat steel, aluminium section, titanium alloy, angle iron, plastic, polycarbonate, polypropylene, polystyrene, or ABS plastic. Steel tent pegs are typically zinc plated or stainless steel. Untreated metal tent pegs are available. Carbon fibre metal tipped tent pegs are also manufactured. Wooden tent pegs are now not common, with higher strength to weight ratio, and high durability, materials being used instead.

== Tent pegs in history and society ==
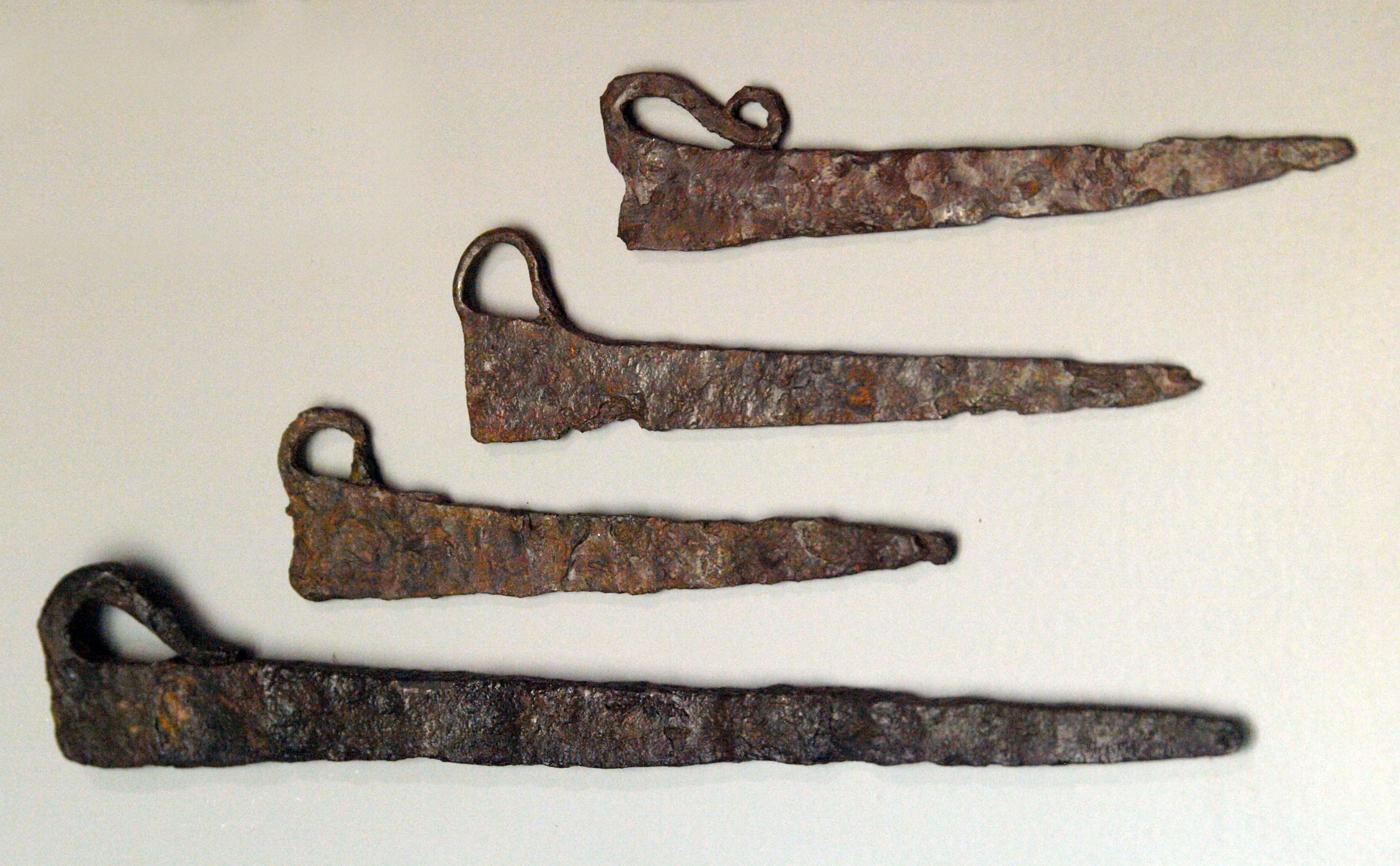
Roman iron tent pegs of 2nd/3rd century AD

Armies on the move have often used tents for sleeping accommodation overnight. A tactic used by an opposing force was to initiate an attack by riding on horse back at speed through an army's tents knocking the tent pegs out of the ground thereby collapsing tents on the enemy as they slept providing a means to hinder the enemy while a more direct attack took place. This practice has now developed into a stylised equestrian sport in various forms called tent pegging.

=== Improvised use of tent pegs ===
The Book of Judges provides the story of Jael, the wife of Heber, a Kenite tentmaker in which Jael kills Sisera by driving a tent peg through his temple as he sleeps. (4:21) Tent pegs have also been used as murder weapons in recent history, for example in the murder of Billie-Jo Jenkins.

Other uses of tent pegs are as improvised climbing pitons, for example in the siege of the Sogdian Rock and Jean-Christophe Lafaille's self rescue on Annapurna.
