= Ark Helenswood Academy =

Location
- The Ridge; St Leonards-on-Sea, East Sussex, TN37 7PS; England; 50.88764°N 0.56738°E

Information
- Type: Academy
- Established: 1929
- Closed: 2019
- Department for Education URN: 139996 Tables
- Ofsted: Reports
- Gender: Girls
- Age: 11 to 18

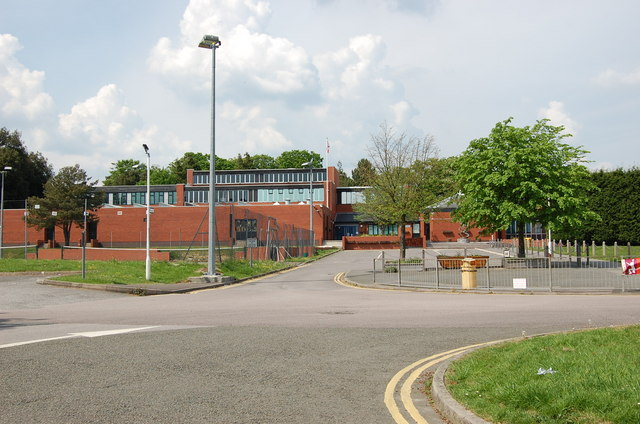
Helenswood Lower School - geograph.org.uk - 812260.jpg

Ark Helenswood Academy (formerly Hastings High School for Girls and then Helenswood School) was a secondary school and sixth form for girls located in St Leonards-on-Sea, East Sussex, England.

The school now forms part of Ark Alexandra Academy.

== History ==
The school opened in 1929 in a large house situated on The Ridge, Hastings by the name of 'The Cleeve'.It was called Hastings High School for Girls. This building was condemned and demolished in 1967, with the school moving to new buildings adjacent to the original site, with a tower block being constructed for classrooms in 1969. After the borough became comprehensive, the school was renamed Helenswood.

Around 1981, the school developed a further site some two miles along The Ridge and moved the first three years of intake there. The school was run as a community school administered by East Sussex County Council. In September 2013 Helenswood School was converted to academy status and was renamed Helenswood Academy (later Ark Helenswood Academy). The school was then sponsored by Ark, but continued to coordinate with East Sussex County Council for admissions.

Ark Helenswood Academy shared its sixth form provision with Ark William Parker Academy, a local school for boys.

In September 2019 Ark Helenswood Academy formally merged with Ark William Parker Academy to form Ark Alexandra Academy, a co-educational school based over the two former school sites. The former Ark Helenswood Academy on The Ridge is now used for pupils aged 11 to 13 (academic years 7 and 8). However the Cleave site was decommissioned.
