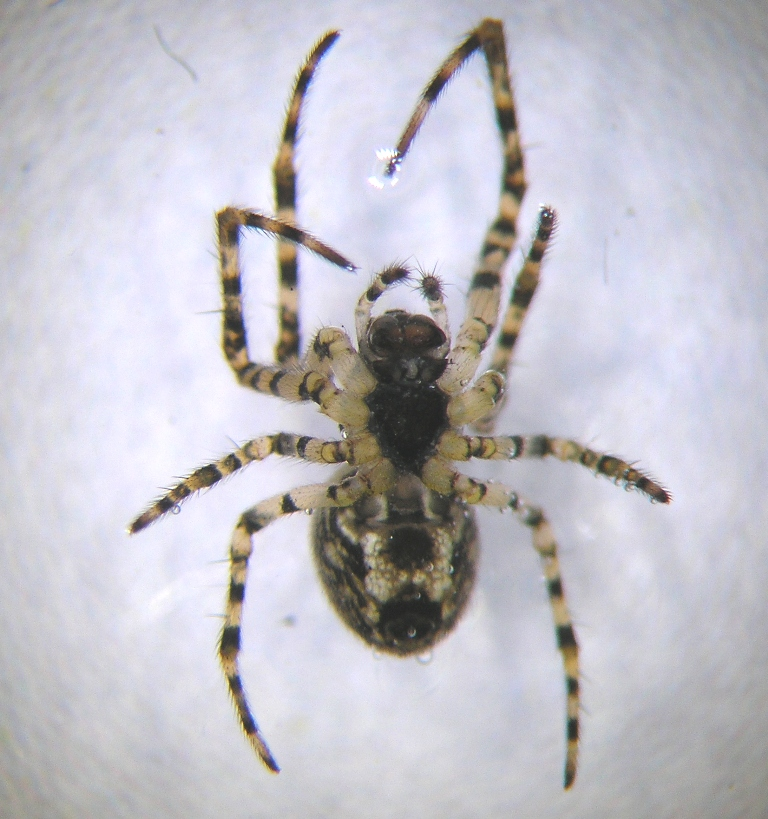

Scientific classification
- Kingdom: Animalia
- Phylum: Arthropoda
- Subphylum: Chelicerata
- Class: Arachnida
- Order: Araneae
- Infraorder: Araneomorphae
- Family: Tetragnathidae
- Genus: Metellina
- Species: M. merianae

Binomial name
- Metellina merianae (Scopoli, 1763)

Subspecies
- Metellina merianae celata (Blackwall, 1841) (Europe)

Synonyms
- Aranea antriada Walckenaer, 1802; Aranea fusca De Geer, 1778; Aranea merianae Scopoli, 1763; Epeira antriada (Walckenaer, 1802); Epeira celata Blackwall, 1841; Epeira inclinata Sundevall, 1833; Meta fusca (De Geer, 1778); Meta merianae (Scopoli, 1763); Meta muraria C. L. Koch, 1841; Meta subterranea Lebert, 1877; Metellina merianae (Scopoli, 1763); Zilla antriada (Walckenaer, 1802)

= Metellina merianae =

Species of spider

Metellina merianae is a spider species in the family Tetragnathidae (long-jawed orb weavers) found from Europe to Central Asia.

They most commonly dwell in the entrances of caves but can also be found in burrows and hollow trees. The webs of M. merianae reach up to about 100 square cm.

== Taxonomy ==
The species was first described in 1763 by Giovanni Antonio Scopoli. It was transferred to the genus Meta in 1835 by Carl Ludwig Koch and then to Metellina in 1980 by Herbert Walter Levi.
