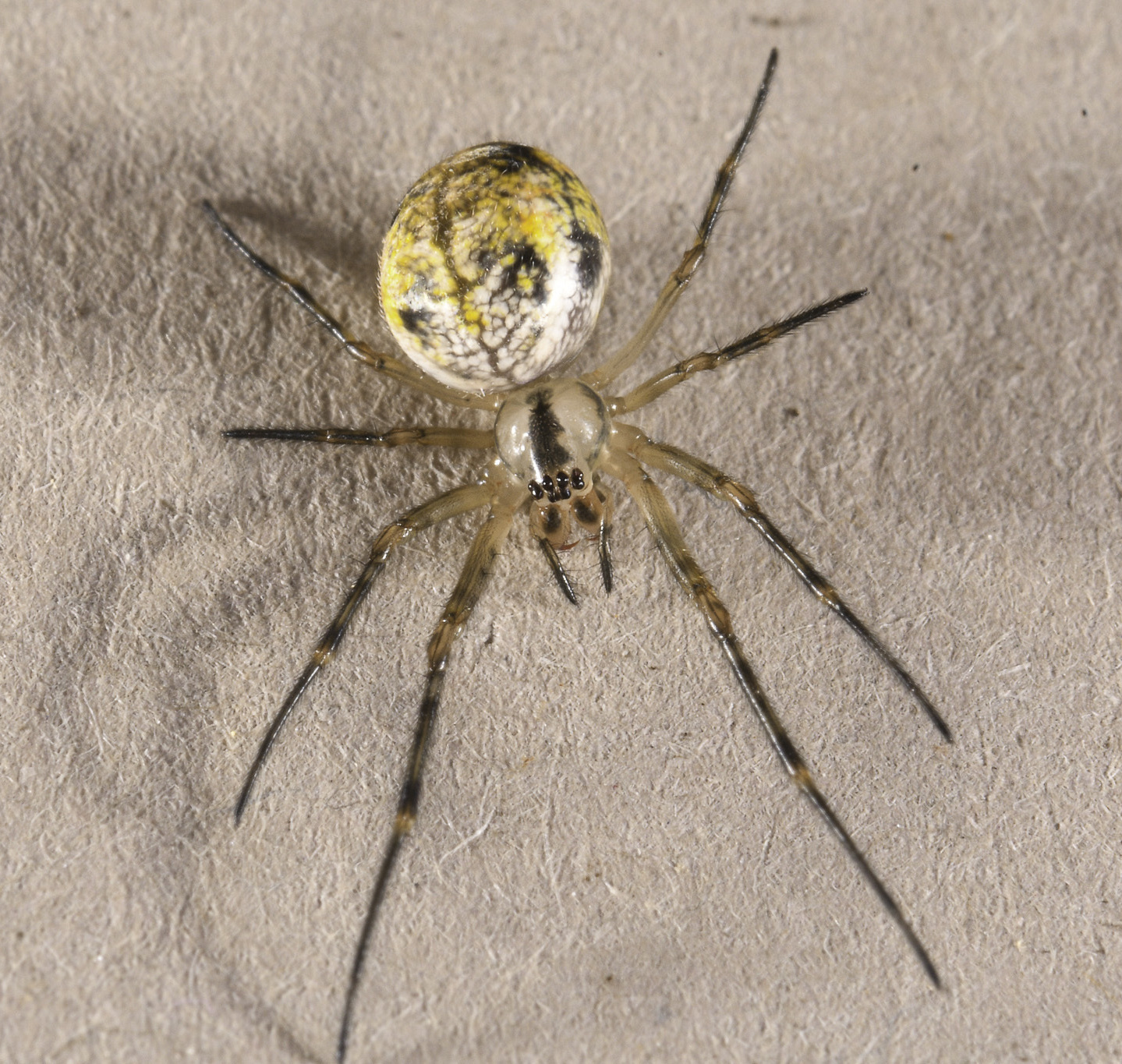

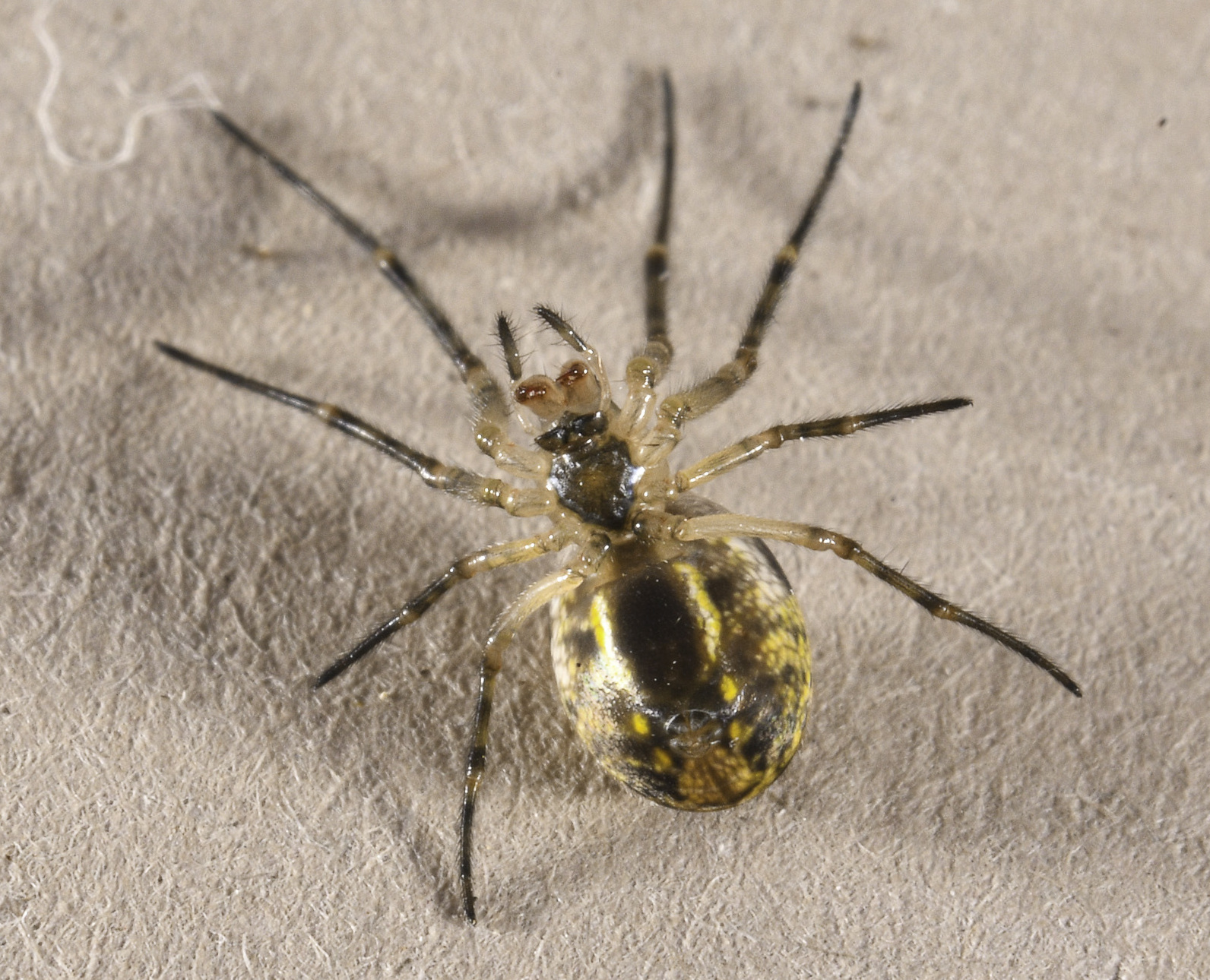

Scientific classification
- Kingdom: Animalia
- Phylum: Arthropoda
- Subphylum: Chelicerata
- Class: Arachnida
- Order: Araneae
- Infraorder: Araneomorphae
- Family: Tetragnathidae
- Genus: Metellina
- Species: M. haddadi

Binomial name
- Metellina haddadi Marusik & Larsen, 2018

= Metellina haddadi =

Haddad's Orb-Web Spider

Species of spider

Metellina haddadi is a species of spider in the family Tetragnathidae. It is endemic to South Africa and is commonly known as Haddad's orb-web spider.

== Distribution ==
Metellina haddadi is known only from the foothills of Newlands Forest in Cape Town, Western Cape.

== Habitat and ecology ==
The species occurs in vegetation in the Fynbos biome.

== Description ==
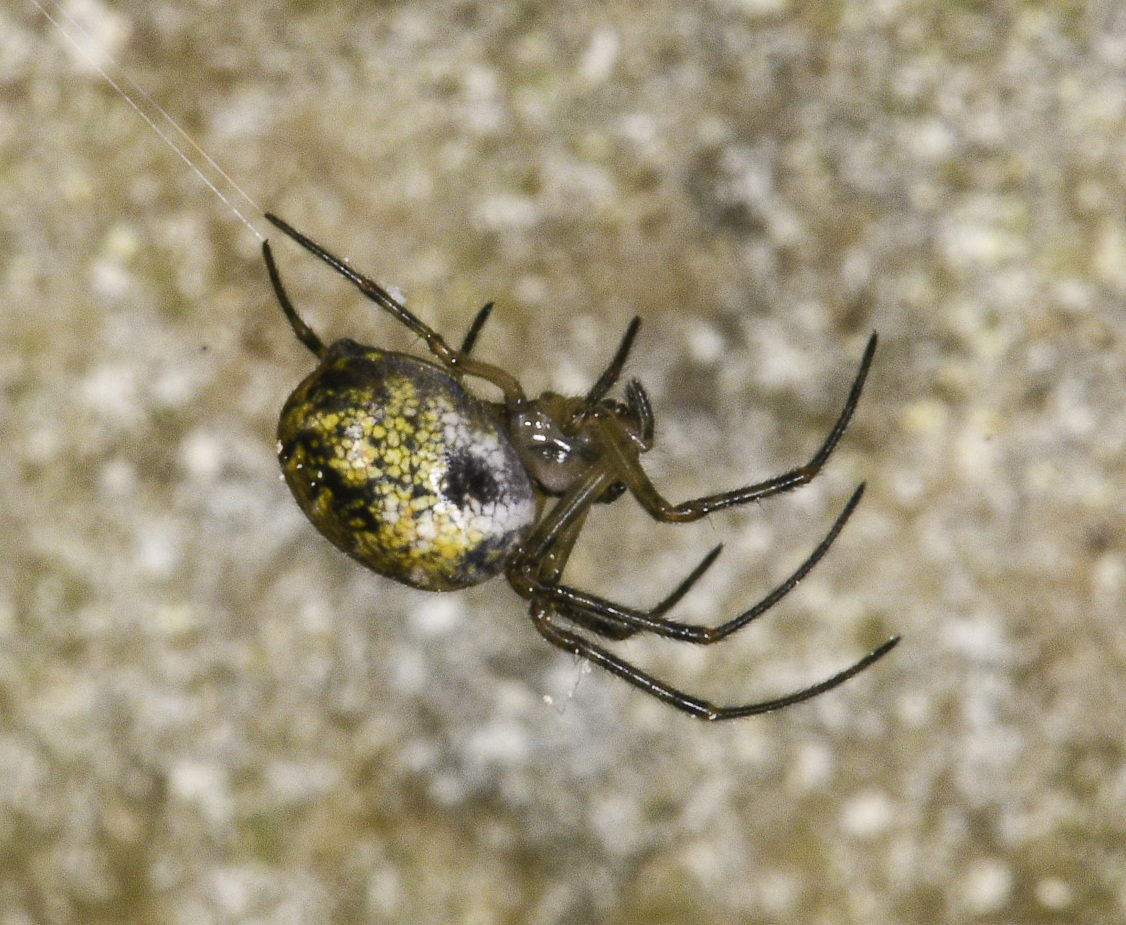

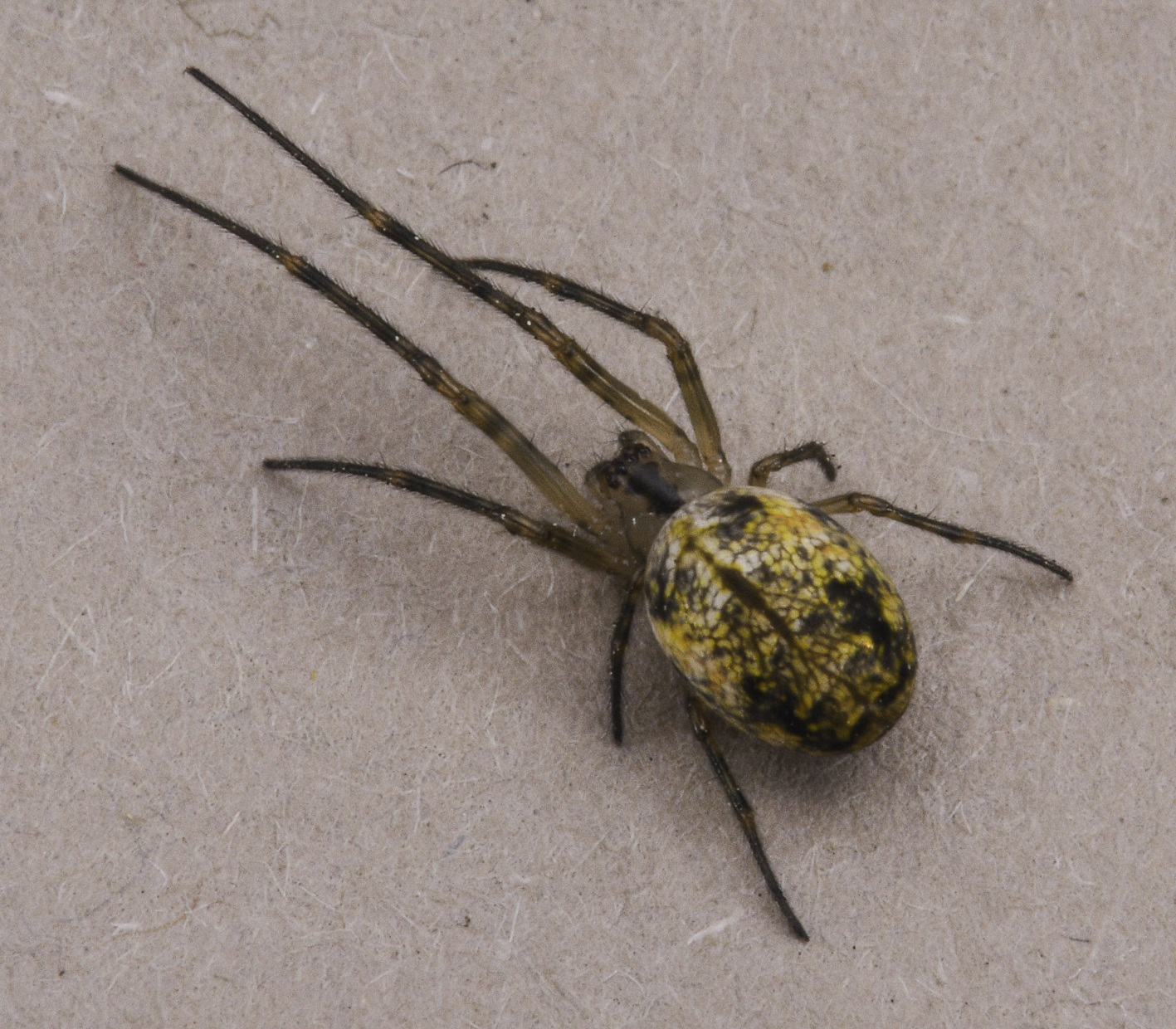

== Conservation ==
Metellina haddadi is listed as Data Deficient by the South African National Biodiversity Institute. More sampling is needed to determine the species' range. The species is protected in Table Mountain National Park, but threats are unknown.

== Etymology ==
The species is named after Charles R. Haddad, a South African arachnologist.
