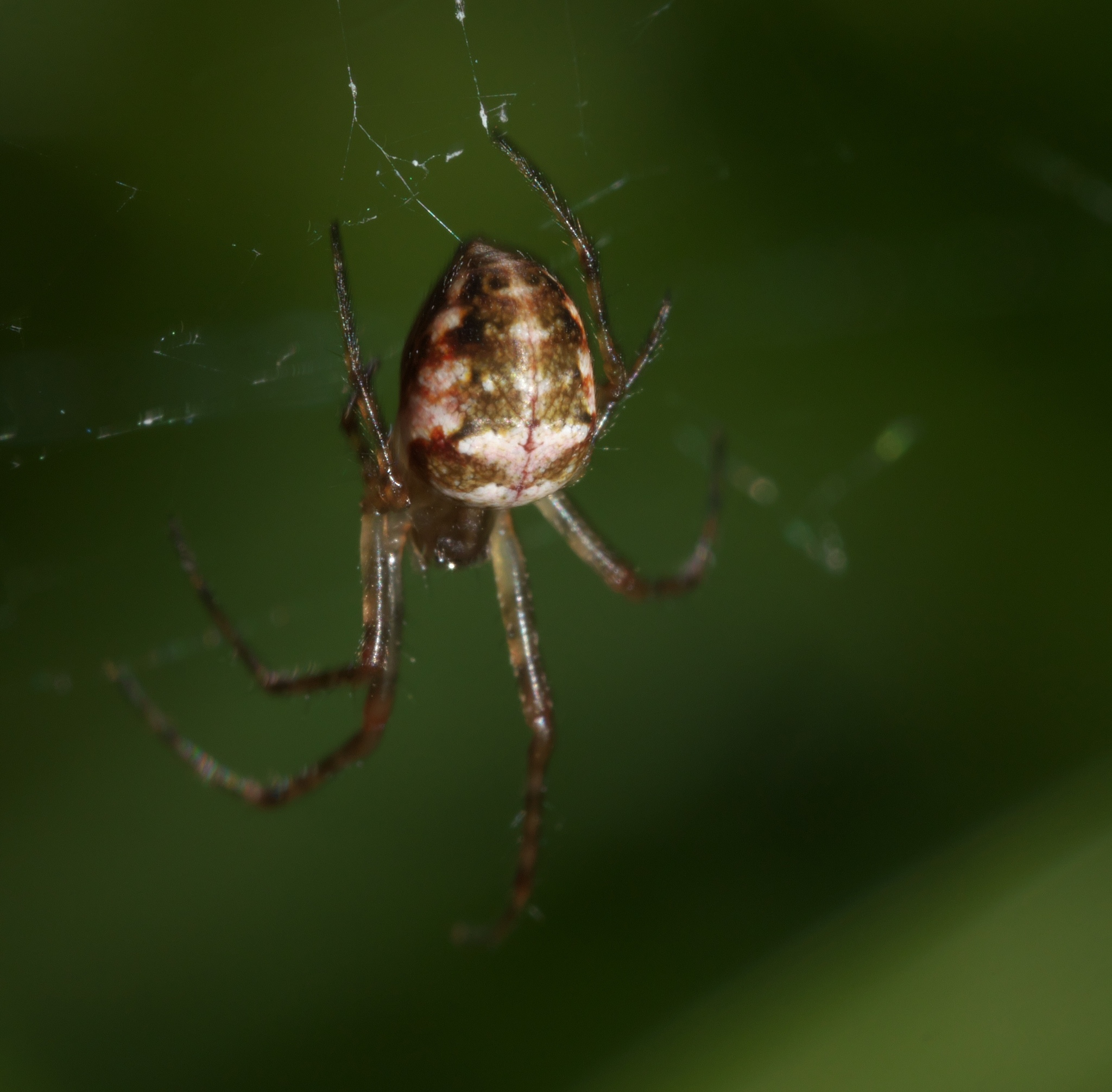
- Metellina curtisi, Washington

Scientific classification
- Domain: Eukaryota
- Kingdom: Animalia
- Phylum: Arthropoda
- Subphylum: Chelicerata
- Class: Arachnida
- Order: Araneae
- Infraorder: Araneomorphae
- Family: Tetragnathidae
- Genus: Metellina
- Species: M. curtisi

Binomial name
- Metellina curtisi (McCook, 1894)

= Metellina curtisi =

Species of spider

Metellina curtisi is a species of long-jawed orb weaver in the spider family Tetragnathidae. It is found in North America.
