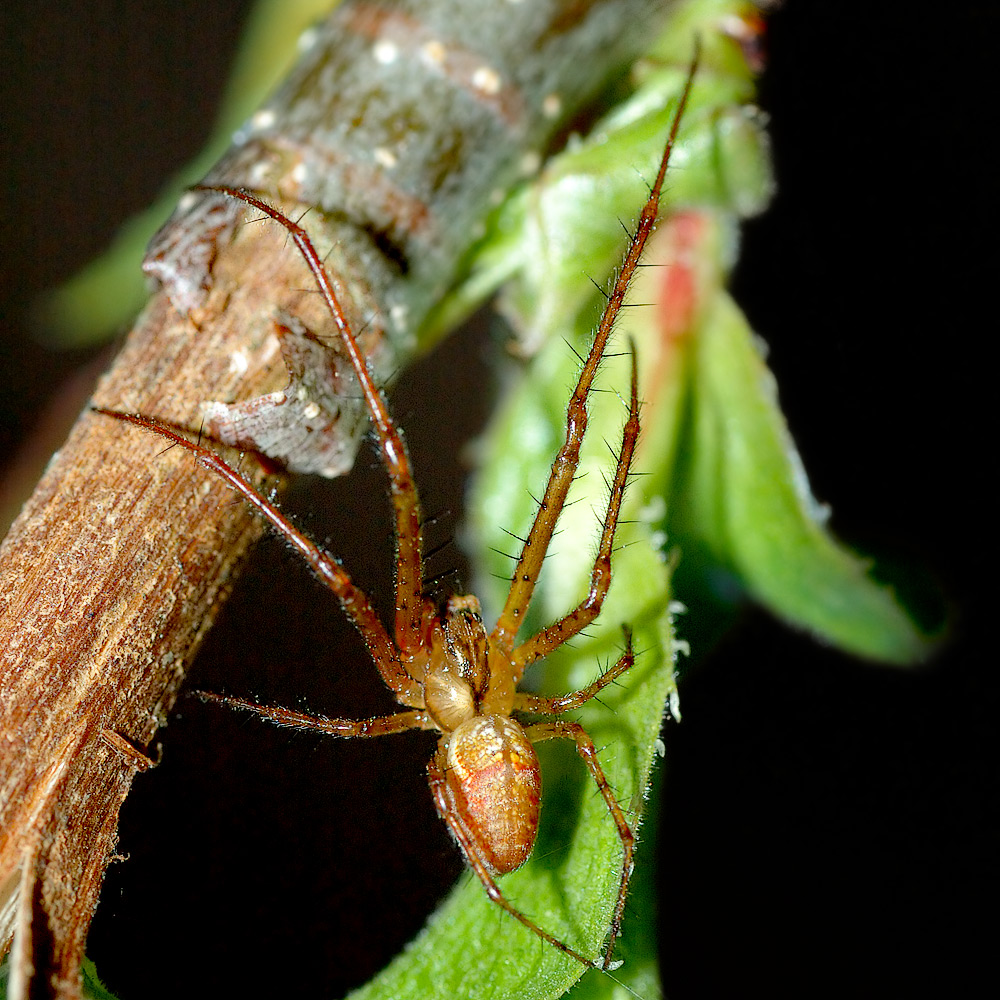

Scientific classification
- Domain: Eukaryota
- Kingdom: Animalia
- Phylum: Arthropoda
- Subphylum: Chelicerata
- Class: Arachnida
- Order: Araneae
- Infraorder: Araneomorphae
- Family: Tetragnathidae
- Genus: Metellina
- Species: M. mengei

Binomial name
- Metellina mengei (Blackwall, 1870)

= Metellina mengei =

Species of spider

Metellina mengei is a spider of the family Tetragnathidae that is found in Europe up to Georgia. It was once considered a form of M. segmentata that occurs in spring. M. mengei is much rarer than M. segmentata.

== Description ==
Metellina mengei is very similar to Metellina segmentata, from which it can only be discerned by comparing genital features. It is about 5 mm long. Adults are found from May to July.
