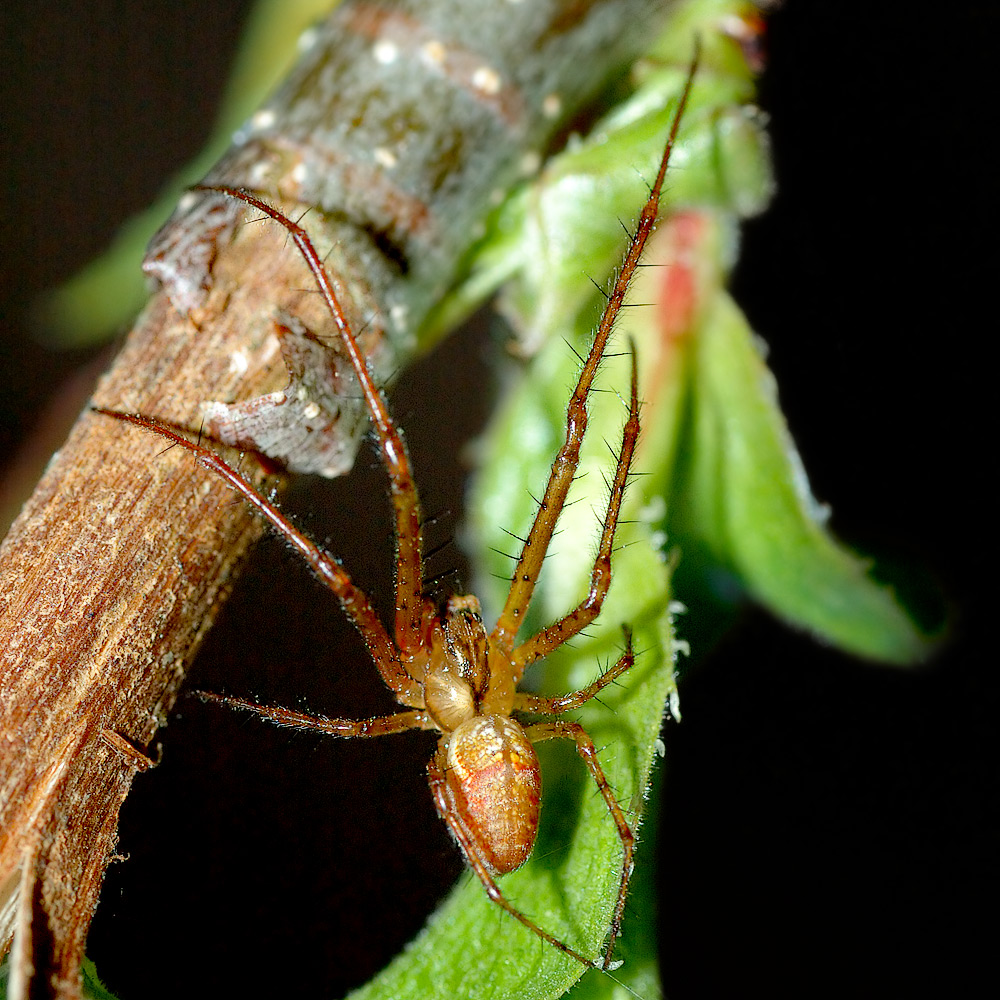
- Metellina mengei
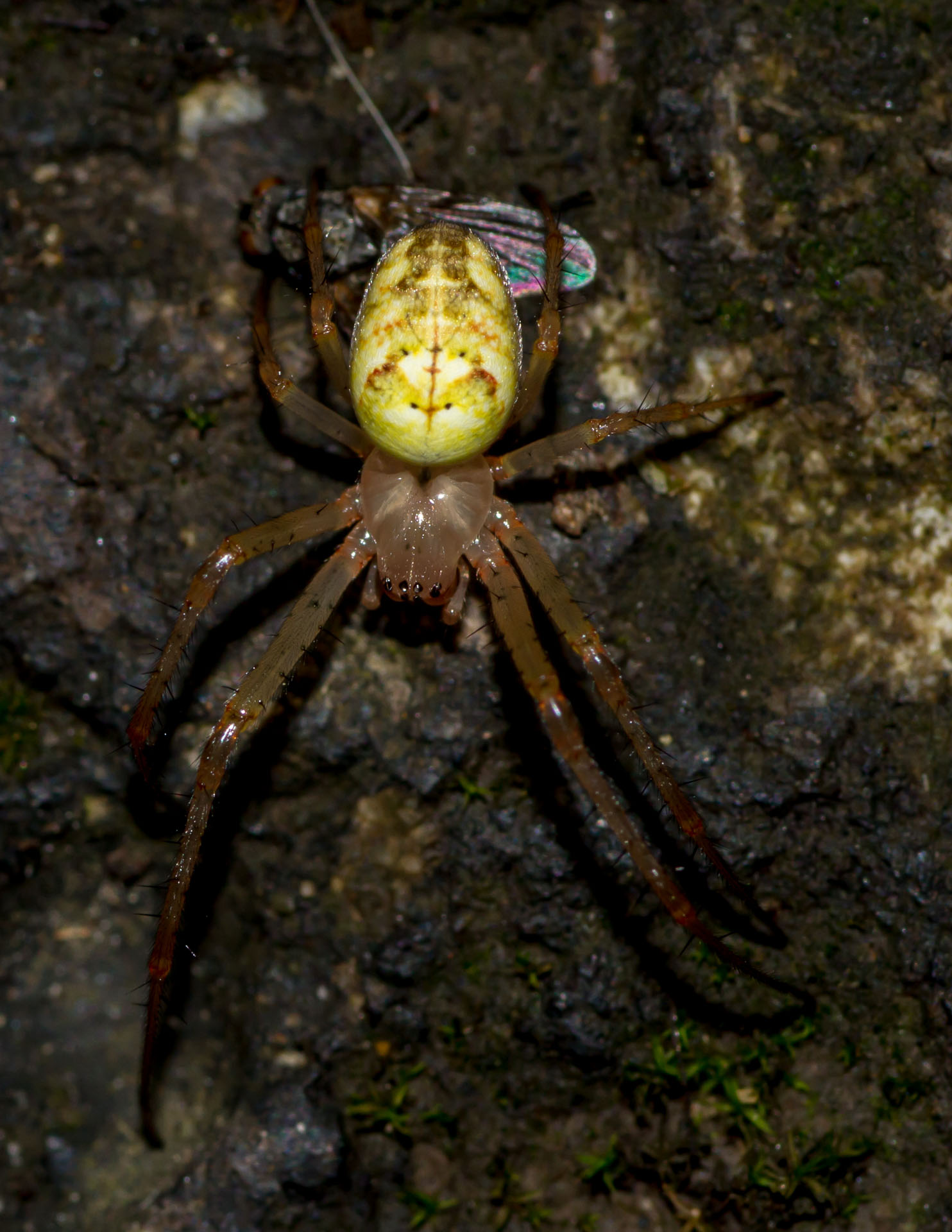
- female

Scientific classification
- Kingdom: Animalia
- Phylum: Arthropoda
- Subphylum: Chelicerata
- Class: Arachnida
- Order: Araneae
- Infraorder: Araneomorphae
- Family: Tetragnathidae
- Genus: Metellina; Chamberlin & Ivie, 1941

Type species
- Pachygnatha curtisi McCook, 1894

Species
- See text.

Diversity
- 16 species

Synonyms
- Menosira Chikuni, 1955

= Metellina =

Genus of spiders

Metellina is a genus of tetragnathid spiders that occurs mostly in Eurasia, with two species found in North America. M. segmentata was introduced to Canada.

Some researchers consider this genus to belong to a distinct family, the Metidae.

M. segmentata is probably the most abundant orb-weaving spider of Germany.

Metellina Spiders are also called the Autumn Spider.

== Description ==
Metellina species have an abdomen longer than wide, usually without tubercles. The secondary eyes have a canoe-shaped tapetum. The posterior lateral eyes are located on a single tubercle.

The epigynal plate is flat with posterior-facing copulatory openings. The fertilization ducts originate near the anterior area of the spermathecae with a mass of accessory glands near the copulatory ducts. The palpal patella has one macroseta.

The genus is most similar to Meta.

== Life style ==
Metellina species are web dwellers that make their webs low in vegetation.

== Name ==
The genus name is an alteration of the related genus Meta.

== Species ==
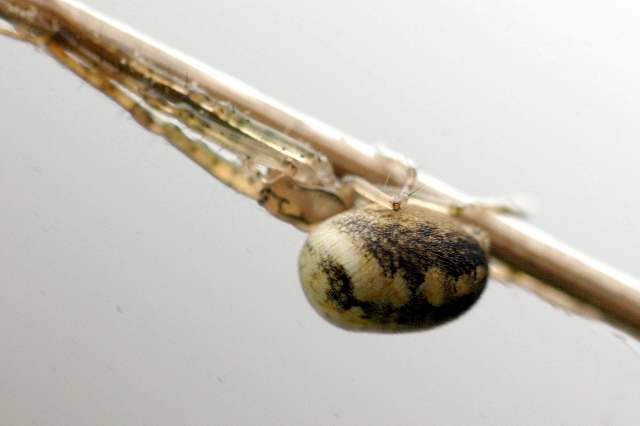
Metellina sp. from Belgium

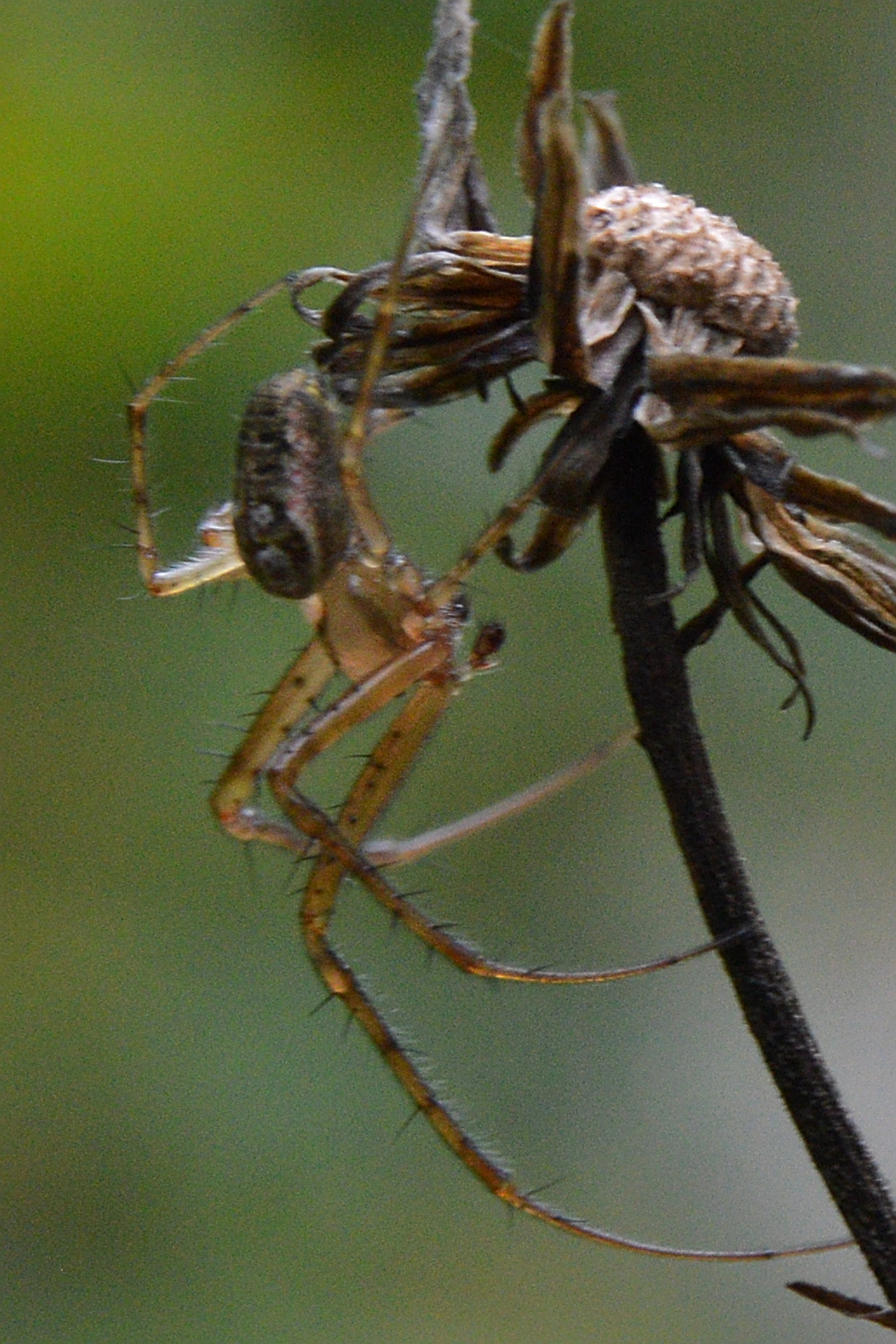
Metellina sp. from Norway

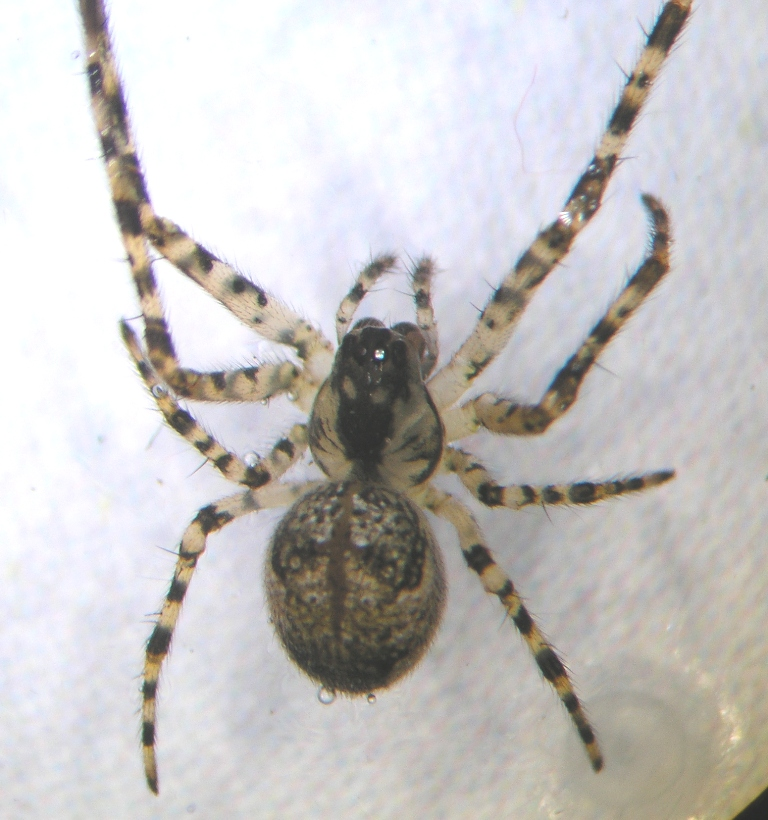
M. merianae

As of October 2025, this genus includes sixteen species:

- Metellina barreti (Kulczyński, 1899) – Madeira
- Metellina curtisi (McCook, 1894) – North America (type species)
- Metellina gertschi (Lessert, 1938) – DR Congo
- Metellina haddadi Marusik & Larsen, 2018 – South Africa
- Metellina kirgisica (Bakhvalov, 1974) – Azerbaijan, Kazakhstan, Central Asia, China
- Metellina longipalpis (Pavesi, 1883) – Ethiopia
- Metellina mengei (Blackwall, 1869) – Europe to Caucasus, Iran, Russia (Europe to Altai)
- Metellina merianae (Scopoli, 1763) – Europe, Caucasus, Turkey, Iran, Russia (Europe to Central Asia)
- Metellina merianopsis (Tullgren, 1910) – Tanzania
- Metellina mimetoides Chamberlin & Ivie, 1941 – North America
- Metellina minima (Denis, 1953) – Canary Islands
- Metellina orientalis (Spassky, 1932) – Turkey, Armenia, Iran, Kazakhstan, Turkmenistan
- Metellina ornata (Chikuni, 1955) – Russia (Far East), China, Korea, Japan
- Metellina segmentata (Clerck, 1757) – Europe, Morocco, Turkey, Israel, Caucasus, Russia (Europe to South Siberia), Kazakhstan, Iran, China, Japan. Introduced to Canada
- Metellina tangchao Lin & Yang, 2023 – China
- Metellina villiersi (Denis, 1955) – Guinea
