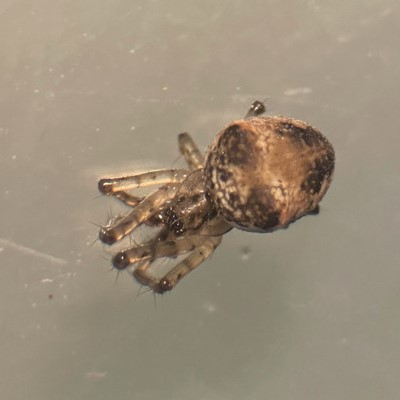

Scientific classification
- Kingdom: Animalia
- Phylum: Arthropoda
- Subphylum: Chelicerata
- Class: Arachnida
- Order: Araneae
- Infraorder: Araneomorphae
- Family: Tetragnathidae
- Genus: Metellina
- Species: M. mimetoides

Binomial name
- Metellina mimetoides Chamberlin & Ivie, 1941

= Metellina mimetoides =

Species of spider

Metellina mimetoides is a species of long-jawed orb weaver in the spider family Tetragnathidae. It is found in North America.
