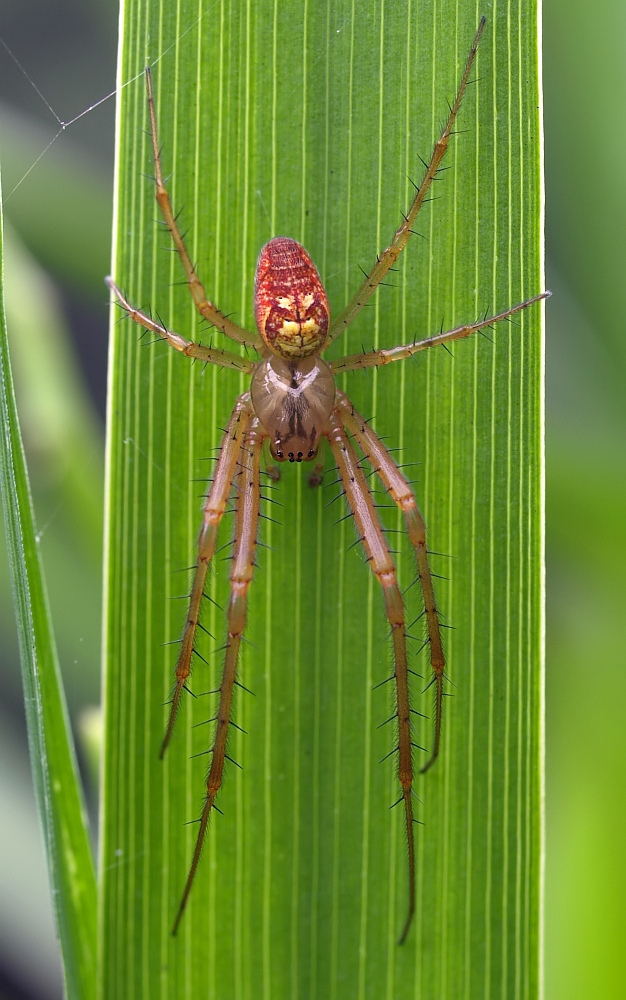

Scientific classification
- Kingdom: Animalia
- Phylum: Arthropoda
- Subphylum: Chelicerata
- Class: Arachnida
- Order: Araneae
- Infraorder: Araneomorphae
- Family: Tetragnathidae
- Genus: Metellina
- Species: M. segmentata

Binomial name
- Metellina segmentata (Clerck, 1757)

Synonyms
- Araneus segmentatus Aranea reticulata Aranea angulata Aranea senoculata Aranea segmentata Aranea inclinata Epeira inclinata Epeira variegata Zilla reticulata Miranda piniophila Meta segmentata Zilla inclinata Meta antrorum

= Metellina segmentata =

Species of spider

Metellina segmentata is a spider in the family Tetragnathidae with a Palaearctic distribution. This spider's name is often shortened to Meta segmentata, and some even call it Araneus segmentatus simply meaning, orb weaving spiders. It is primarily found in Europe, with the highest number in the United Kingdom, but the species has also been introduced to Canada.

Adults can be found from August to October, and they prefer open habitats on the edges of woods or gardens), likely because they are amongst the most frequent orb-weaving spiders.

Similar to most tetragnathid spiders, the web has no threads at its center, and they are built relatively low above the ground. Most of the time, the spider sits at the center of the web, but sometimes they retreat to hide at the edge and sense prey with the help of a signaling thread.

== Taxonomy and nomenclature ==
Metellina segmentata is part of the Metellina genus and the Tetragnathidae family. The name segmentata comes from a Roman Empire armor that has a similar marking as the spider. They belong in a clade with panarthropoda and, their closest relative is Metellina mengei.

== Description ==
Metellina segmentata has yellow, red, and orange colors on their abdomen with a black fork-like mark in the center of the carapace. Its topside is a pale cream color with shades of red and pink. However, as is the case with many other spider species, there are large variations in its colors and markings. On the underside of females, there is a black strip that extends to the end of the epigyne. When they are resting on grass, two legs stretch to the front while the other six legs stretch backward. Males are normally 4-6 mm long while females are slightly larger 4-8 mm long. They have a very similar appearance to Metallina mengei, and the only sure way of identification is by looking at the genitalia.

Males tend to have longer legs and a bigger prosoma, but females have a larger opisthosoma because the eggs are produced and carried in this organ. Both genders, but especially females, have powerful chelicerae. Compared to other spiders, the Metellina segmentata have abnormally large epigynes.

== Distribution and habitat ==
=== Distribution ===
Metellina segmentata are primarily found in the United Kingdom within Europe. They have also been recently identified in Canada.

=== Habitat ===
These spiders are known to prefer low, bushy habitats, although some occupy areas heavily covered in branches and leaves that offer extra protection. The habitats of the spiders generally depend on the size. The bigger spiders will reside in higher quality areas that have good lighting and decent wind passage. This includes in between tree branches and on leaves. Smaller spiders will be forced into lower quality areas. These include window corners and bushes where lighting and prey capture is relatively low.

== Diet ==
The diet of Metellina segmentata consists of insects, including flies and moths. After these prey are caught in the webs, they are wrapped and most commonly are eaten almost immediately. Some M. segmentata spiders can and do choose to preserve their wrapped prey for several days. Interestingly, it has been observed that some female spiders cannibalize males in their webs. Metellina segmentata can go weeks without eating, which occurs especially in males during the mating season.

=== Foraging behavior ===
Foraging behavior and the location of web creation varies greatly within M. segmentata. For example, some spiders create their webs in low bushy areas that are open, and there is a lot of wind eddies. This allows the webs to capture a wide variety and high quantity of food. However, these webs are also at higher risk of being destroyed. Therefore, although webs in these areas are able to capture a higher volume of food within a shorter time frame, spiders who reside in these areas must rebuild their webs fairly frequently. Other M. segmentata will choose to spin their webs in areas where there is more protection. This leads to lower web breakages, but may also cost them to catch less prey. Depending on the location of the web, the number of prey captured can vary by up to tenfold. Naturally, female spiders tend to accumulate in areas with high prey yields. It has been observed that when prey capture goes below a certain threshold, many spiders will choose to move to areas that yield greater prey capture.

== Reproduction and life cycle ==
During the mating season in September several males wait for prey in the web of a female. When an insect is caught, all of the males compete for it. The first male will wrap it up and then present it to the female. While he is presenting he will also give signals by plucking the threads of the female's web. The yellow eggs are deposited on a twig or on bark in a spherical white cocoon. This process is very similar to the slightly smaller Metellina mengei, and the two can only be discerned by comparing genital features.

=== Copulation ===
Prior to copulation, males perform a courtship to indicate that they are not prey. This is most commonly done through vibrations on the web. Generally, copulation lasts from 30 seconds to 2 minutes. The eggs are a yellow color, and they are normally placed on twigs in white cocoons.

=== Fecundity ===
Female fecundity is known to have high correlation with female size ー females who have 2mm wide cephalothorax on average, produce around 80 eggs. However, females who have 3mm cephalothorax, on average, produce 160 eggs. Furthermore, this fecundity can depend on the size of the male - generally, the greater the size of the male, the more eggs the females produce.

=== Life-span ===
While females mature over a time span of several weeks, males can mature within a week. After the spiders hatch from their eggs, spiderlings can mature anytime from five to ten molts. After the spider reaches adulthood, these spiders are known to live from one to two years.

=== Sexual dimorphism ===
In Metellina Segmentata, sexual dimorphism is positively correlated with clutch size. Therefore, bigger females are selected for as they are more favorable mating partners relative to smaller females. Furthermore, fecundity is higher for bigger females. This results in females becoming bigger than males and the sexual dimorphism increases every generation. The evolutionary purpose of the sexual dimorphism is that bigger females were selected for so that they could carry more eggs and therefore pass on more genes through their offspring. The weight of more eggs in the opisthosoma requires females to possess more powerful legs and carapace to carry the heavier weight. The bigger females are able to mate more because the large size is an indication of the female's ability to carry more eggs. As organisms want to pass on as many genes as possible, males choose bigger females as they possess better fecundity.

== Mating ==
=== Courtship and pre-copulation ===
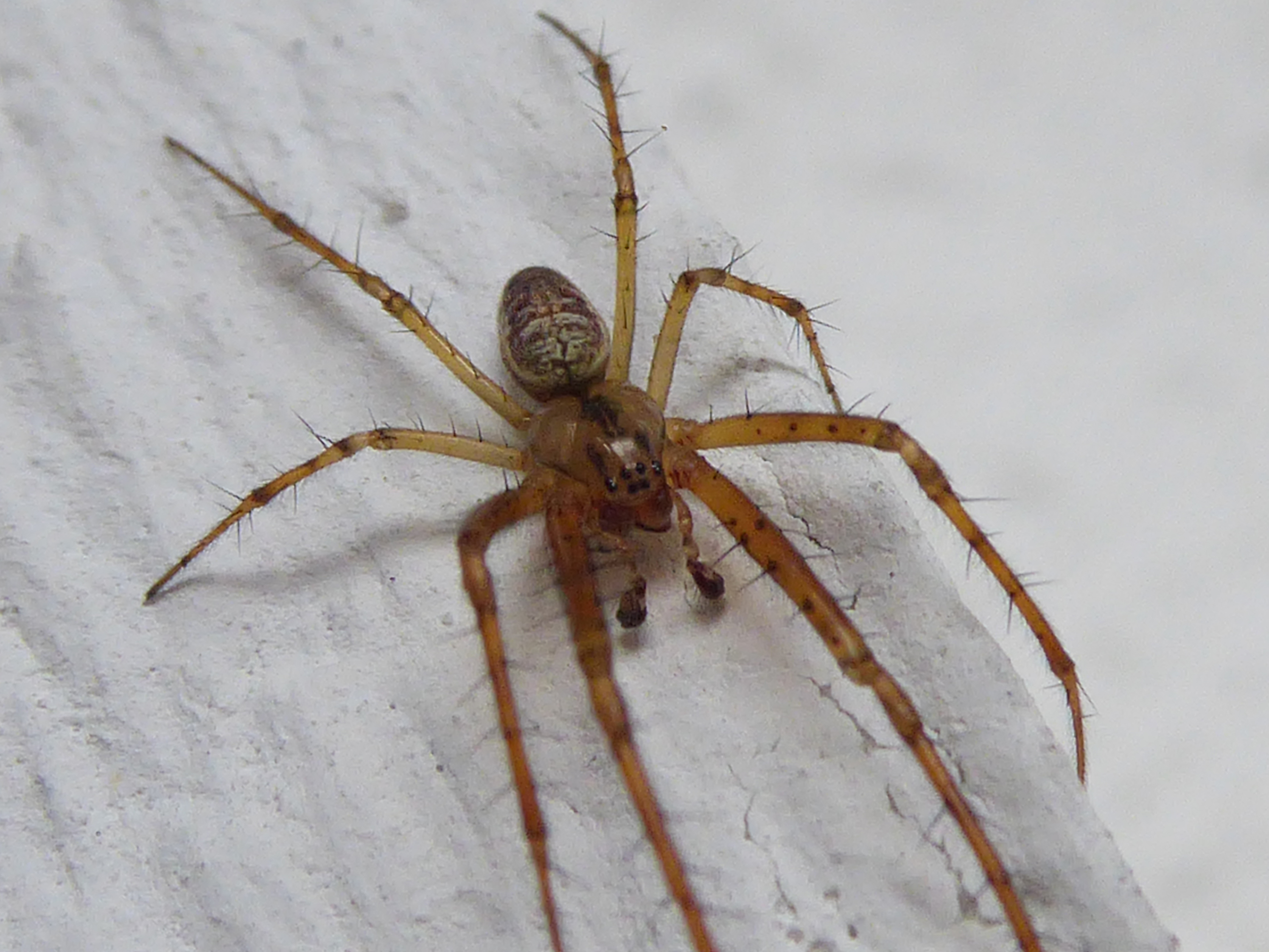
Metellina segmentata

A large portion of male mating behavior is influenced by female behavior. Young males build webs outside of the mating season. Similarly to females, males use these webs to capture prey. However, they abandon these webs during the mating season to seek for females. Males can detect females by smelling the pheromone on their webs. When young males arrive at the web, they must wait for a large enough prey to be caught in the web. Males are seen to care for female webs up to 3-4 weeks prior to courtship. After the female eats the prey, the male performs courtship. The males wait for the arrival of a big enough prey in order to reduce their chances of being cannibalized. There are known cases where male spiders will kill the competing male, wrap him in silk, and present it to the female. In other cases, males can wrap the prey caught in the web and present it to the female. Both of these are thought to lower the risk of cannibalization. Sometimes, males will attempt to mate prior to a large enough prey being caught or courtship. This can sometimes lead to copulation, although the chance of the female cannibalizing the male, in this case, increases greatly. In some cases, males must wait for days and even weeks for a large enough prey to be caught in the web. Due to the fact that males wait in the corner of the web, the amount of food intake for a male during the mating season is significantly lower compared to the food intake of males outside of the mating season and relative to female food intake. During the mating season, males can sometimes not feed at all.

=== Male/male interactions ===
==== Aggression ====
Males are required to be patient to acquire a sufficiently sized prey; this excess time forces males to compete with one another for the female. Males that get displaced by other males, most often a bigger male, must find another female and her web during the mating season. Sometimes there can be multiple males in a single female web. However, as it gets closer to the mating season, aggression between males also increases, and eventually, one male will chase away all of its competition. If the male is displaced early in the mating season, he has a good likelihood that he can find another female. However, this depends on the quality of the web location and the size of the male. Naturally, females in better locations are more favourable for mating. This is mostly due to the fact that larger females contest and beat out smaller females for better habitats. Not only this, but bigger males can generally beat out smaller males when competing for female webs. Therefore, the likelihood of finding another suitable male is dependent on both the size of the male and the habitat of the female. Males that occupy webs tend to be greater than average in size. In some cases, males are killed when they engage in battles with other males that are attempting to displace them. Smaller males are seen to wander from web to web as they get displaced by bigger males. Similar to females, males who are greater in size have an advantage during contests. Resident males also have a greater advantage in winning fights. However, a large size difference will often time outweigh the resident advantage. In general, the biggest males mate with the biggest females. However, in some case males are seen to mate with much larger females. In this case, the female fecundity is generally much lower relative to if the female mates with a male of similar size. Many males will end the mating season without mating with any female.

=== Female/female competition for web location ===
While some female spiders do not contest against neighboring female spiders, others choose to fight other females attempting to create webs near their own web. When webs are destroyed, many females will rebuild them. However, some females have been known to search for new webs and fight other resident females for their webs and location. The duration of the fights between the two females is determined by the quality of the location. The better the location, the longer the duration of the battle. This leads to a greater average female size for occupied webs. Web turnovers are fairly common at the beginning of the mating season, but they gradually decrease as time passes. Furthermore, resident females generally have a greater advantage during fights unless there is a great size disparity.

=== Monogamy and polygyny ===
Females frequently tend to congregate in one area within this species, therefore it makes sense that one male can observe multiple females at the same time. Thus, males can be both monogamous or polygamous, depending on the size. Although time varies, males can copulate as early as two hours after the previous copulation. The largest males will attempt to copulate multiple times during the mating season, and the smaller males often times get displaced. Males that are of greater size are much more likely to be polygamous as they can displace males in multiple webs and mate with multiple females. The majority of the time, smaller males can only practice monogamy.

=== Alternative mating patterns ===
Due to the intense competition for mates, some male Metellina segmentata have alternative mating strategies. In these cases, alternative mating strategies only work when the reproductive benefits outweigh the costs. In poor habitat areas, males almost never experience competition. This is partly due to the lack of appeal but also is due to the more widely spread distribution of females. This means it is less likely for males to wander and randomly find a female. In males with cephalothoraxes less than 2.3mm, they are much more likely to mate in lower quality areas. On the other hand, males with greater than 2.6mm cephalothoraxes are generally expected to have higher mating success in high-quality areas. However, in males with cephalothoraxes between 2.3mm and 2.6mm, alternative mating patterns are observed. Moderately sized spiders can be seen in both habitats and are known to have generally equal reproductive benefits in either habitat. In lower-quality habitats, moderately sized males can mate with low-quality females with virtual certainty. In higher-quality habitats, moderately sized males will have a lower chance of mating but can sometimes mate with a female much greater in size than itself. Per average, the reproductive benefit is equal in both alternates. Studies have shown most male Metellina segmentata are risk-prone and choose high-quality areas that offer low chances of mating but potentially high rewards.

== Webs ==
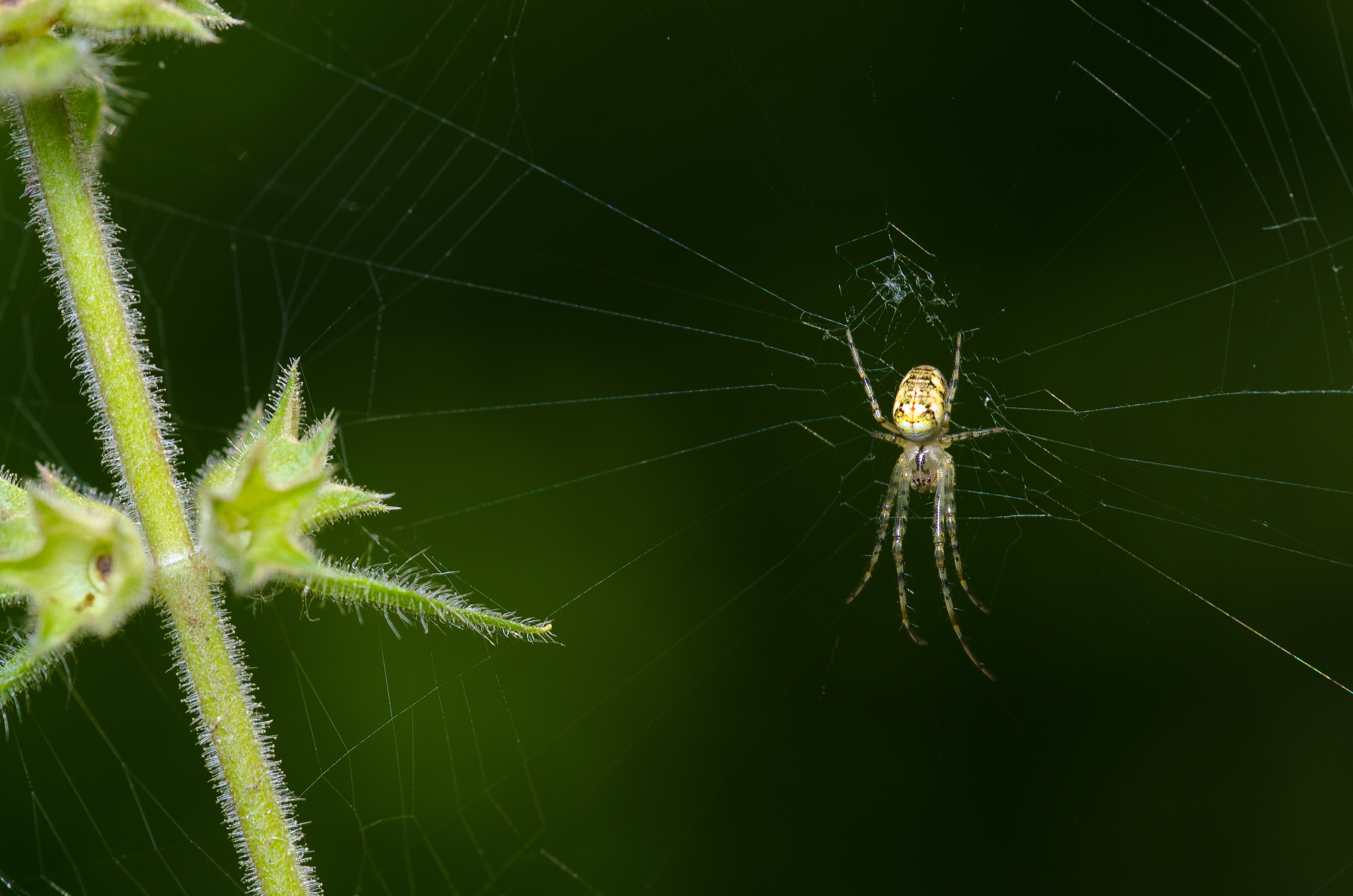
Metellina segmentata suspended on its web

The webs of the Metellina segmentata are orb-shaped and have no threads in the center. They are used to capture prey. During the mating season, males can be seen hiding in the corner of webs. Most of the webs are built slightly above the ground but not very high.

== Bites to humans ==
=== Venom ===
Metellina segmentata are able to produce venom. After catching prey in their webs, the spiders deliver the venom by holding the prey in their pedipalps. However, this venom is not poisonous to humans. There have been no known cases of a Metellina Segmentata biting human beings despite their prevalence in human-populated areas.
