= Chester Terrace =

Terrace in Regent's Park, London

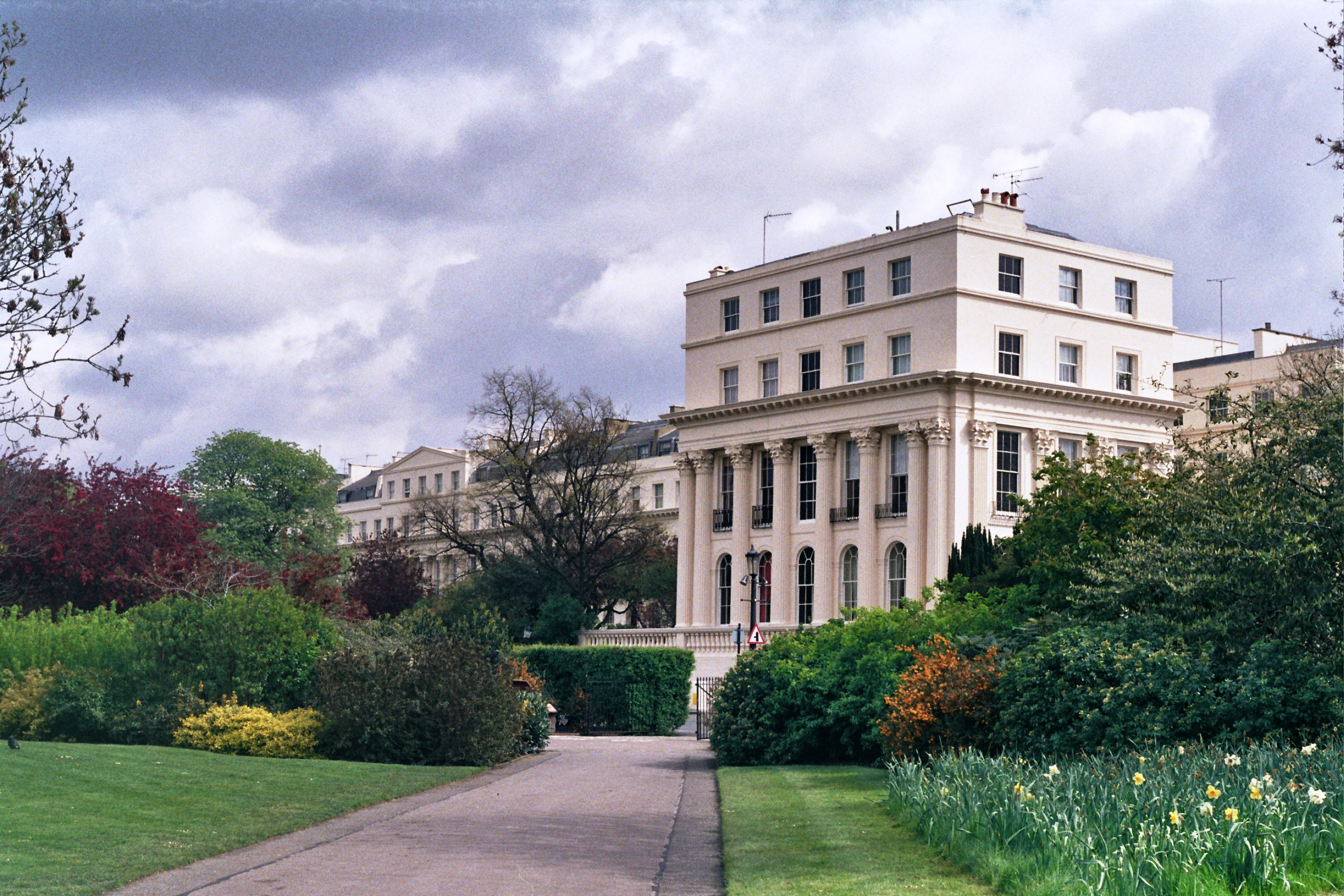
- Interactive map of Chester Terrace
- Length: 0.2 mi (0.32 km)
- Location: Regent's Park, London
- Postal code: NW1 4ND
- Coordinates: 51.5290°N 0.1454°W
- south end: Chester Gate
- north end: Cumberland Place

Construction
- Inauguration: 1825

Chester Terrace is one of the neo-classical terraces in Regent's Park, London. The terrace has the longest unbroken facade in Regent's Park, of about 280 metres (920 ft). It takes its name from one of the titles of George IV before he became king, Earl of Chester. It now lies within the London Borough of Camden.

As with Cornwall Terrace and York Terrace, the architectural plans were made by John Nash but subsequently altered almost beyond recognition by Decimus Burton, who was responsible for the existing design, built by his father James Burton in 1825. Nash was so dissatisfied with Decimus's design that he sought the demolition and complete rebuilding of the Terrace, but in vain. It is a Grade I listed building.

== Architecture ==
All 42 houses are Grade I listed buildings. At each end there is a Corinthian arch bearing at the top the terrace's name in large lettering on a blue background, possibly the largest street signs in London. Five houses are semi-detached with one of these being Nash House (3 Chester Terrace, although the main entrance is in Chester Gate), having a bust of John Nash on its west side, appearing identical to the bust on All Souls Church, Langham Place.

During the Second World War the Nash buildings around the park, including Chester Terrace, fell into what one newspaper called "a sad state of neglect … caused by bombing and the ravages of time". An official report commented "there is not a single terrace which does not give the impression of hopeless dereliction". Restoration work followed in the early 1950s. The terrace was mainly occupied by government departments during and after the war, but by 1957 the freeholder of the terrace, the Crown Estate, had adopted the policy of returning it, and the other Nash terraces, to private residential use, as recommended ten years earlier in the report of a government committee on the post-war future of the terraces.

== Former residents ==
There are two blue plaques on the street: one at No. 13 for the architect Charles Robert Cockerell, and one at No. 27 for Air Marshal John Salmond. The politician John Profumo lived at the aforementioned Nash House, No. 3 Chester Terrace, from 1948 until 1965. His former mistress Christine Keeler later lived in the nearby Chester Close North. The composer Arnold Bax lived at No. 19 from 1911 to 1918. The married actors Sir Ralph Richardson and Meriel Forbes lived at No. 1 Chester Terrace until 1983. The Ooni of Ife, King Okunade Sijuwade, Olubuse II lived in No. 24. Other residents of Chester Terrace have included the artist Aubrey Beardsley, the Nigerian businessman MKO Abiola, the architect Charles Cockerell, the surgeon William Coulson, the Nigerian diplomat Philip Asiodu, the swindler Leopold Redpath, and the journalist Emma Tennant, who was born there.

== In popular culture ==
This location was used for The Avengers' episode "You'll Catch Your Death" (1968). It featured in the 1997 film version of George Orwell's Keep The Aspidistra Flying. It is a major location in the film The End of the Affair (1955). It also features in the film The Nanny (1965).

It is shown in the 1968 Robert Wise musical film Star!, in a brief scene during which Gertrude Lawrence (played by Julie Andrews) receives a writ for unpaid bills. The location is also featured in the film Mrs Henderson Presents as the home of Laura Henderson (played by Judi Dench).

== Gallery ==
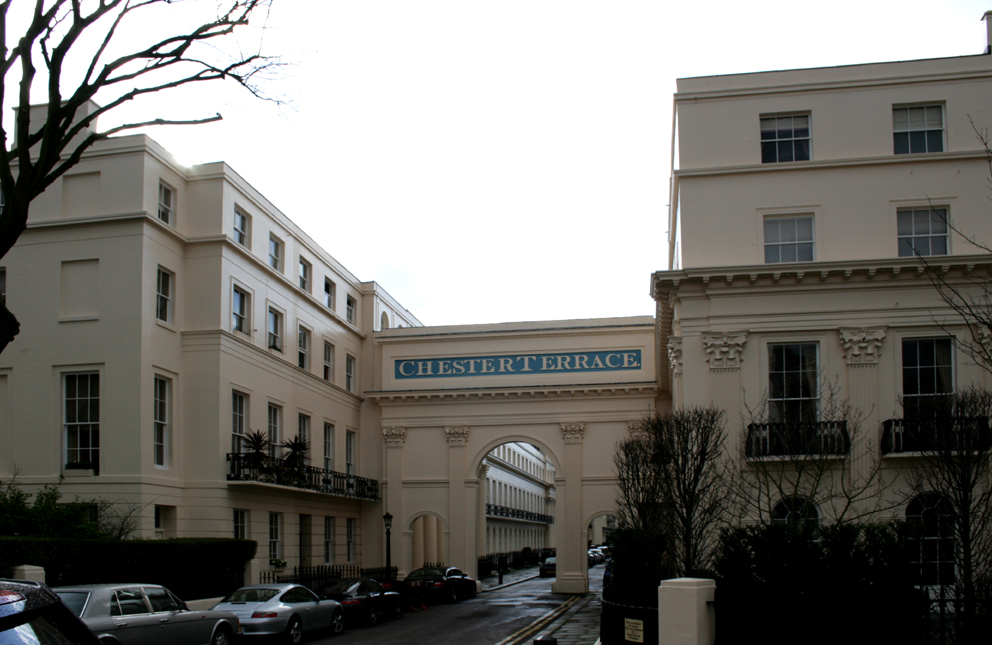
North end

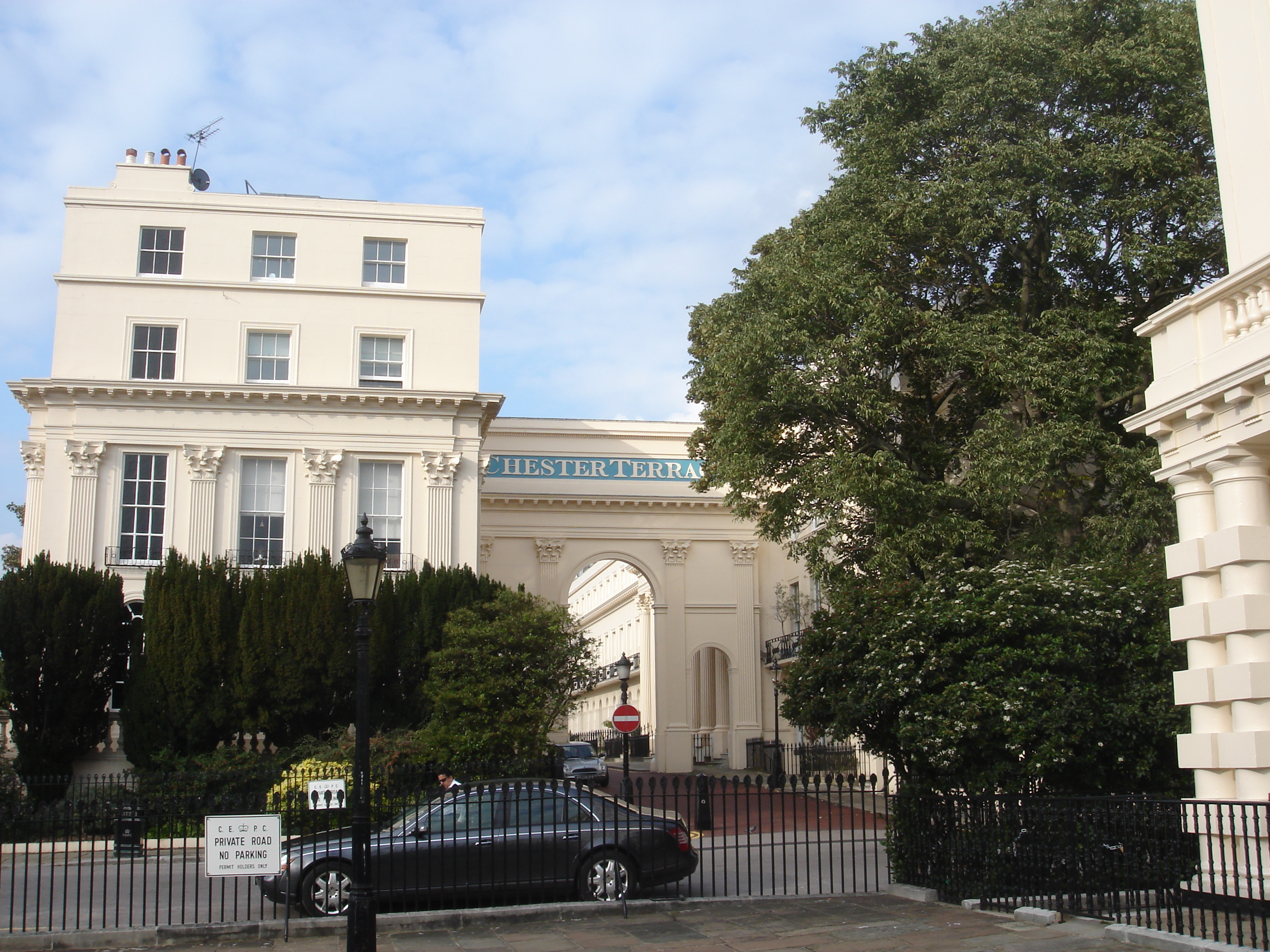
South end

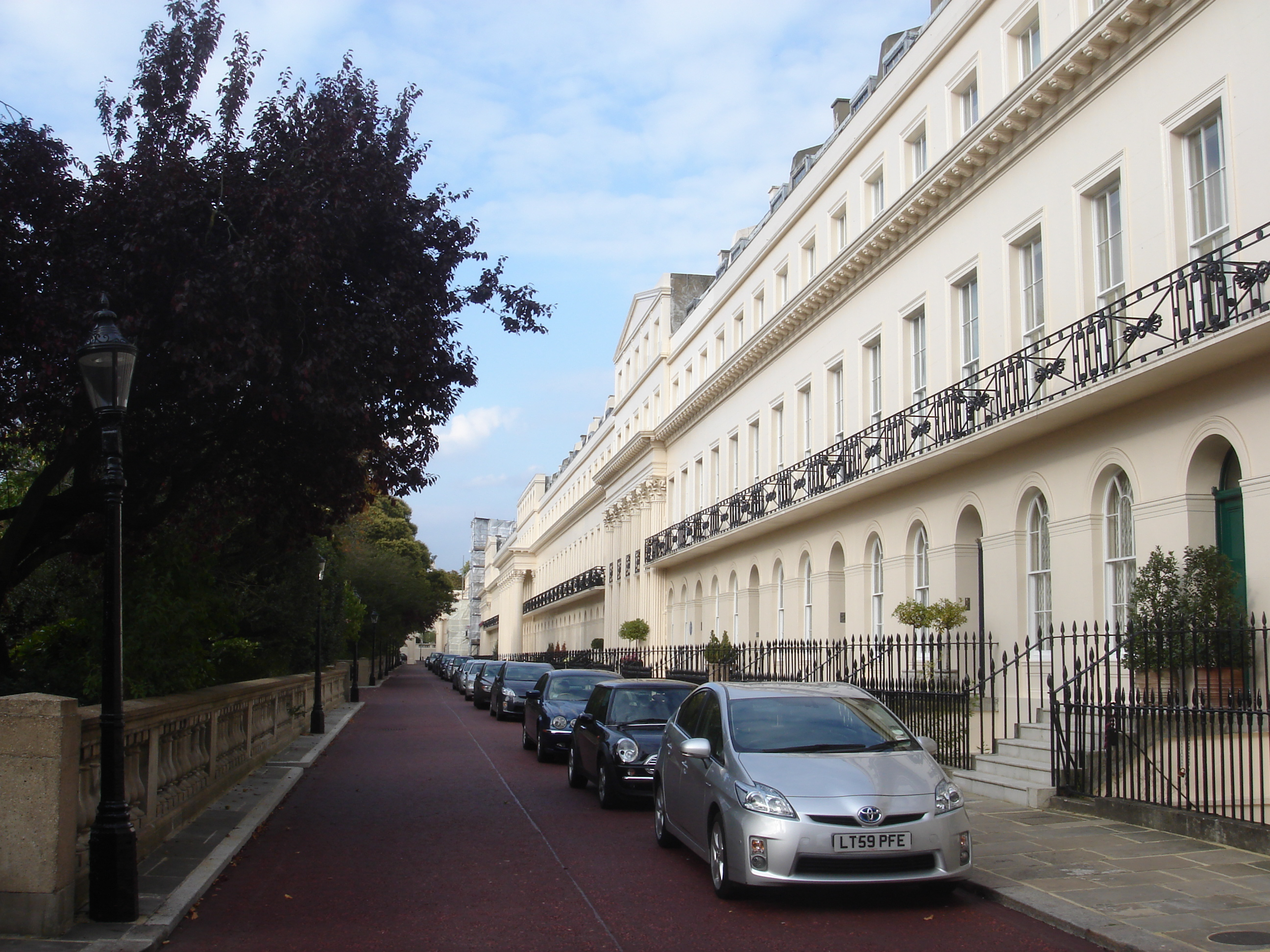

== See also ==
- List of eponymous roads in London
