= James Burton (property developer) =

British property developer and architect (1761–1837)

Lieutenant-Colonel James Burton (previously Haliburton)
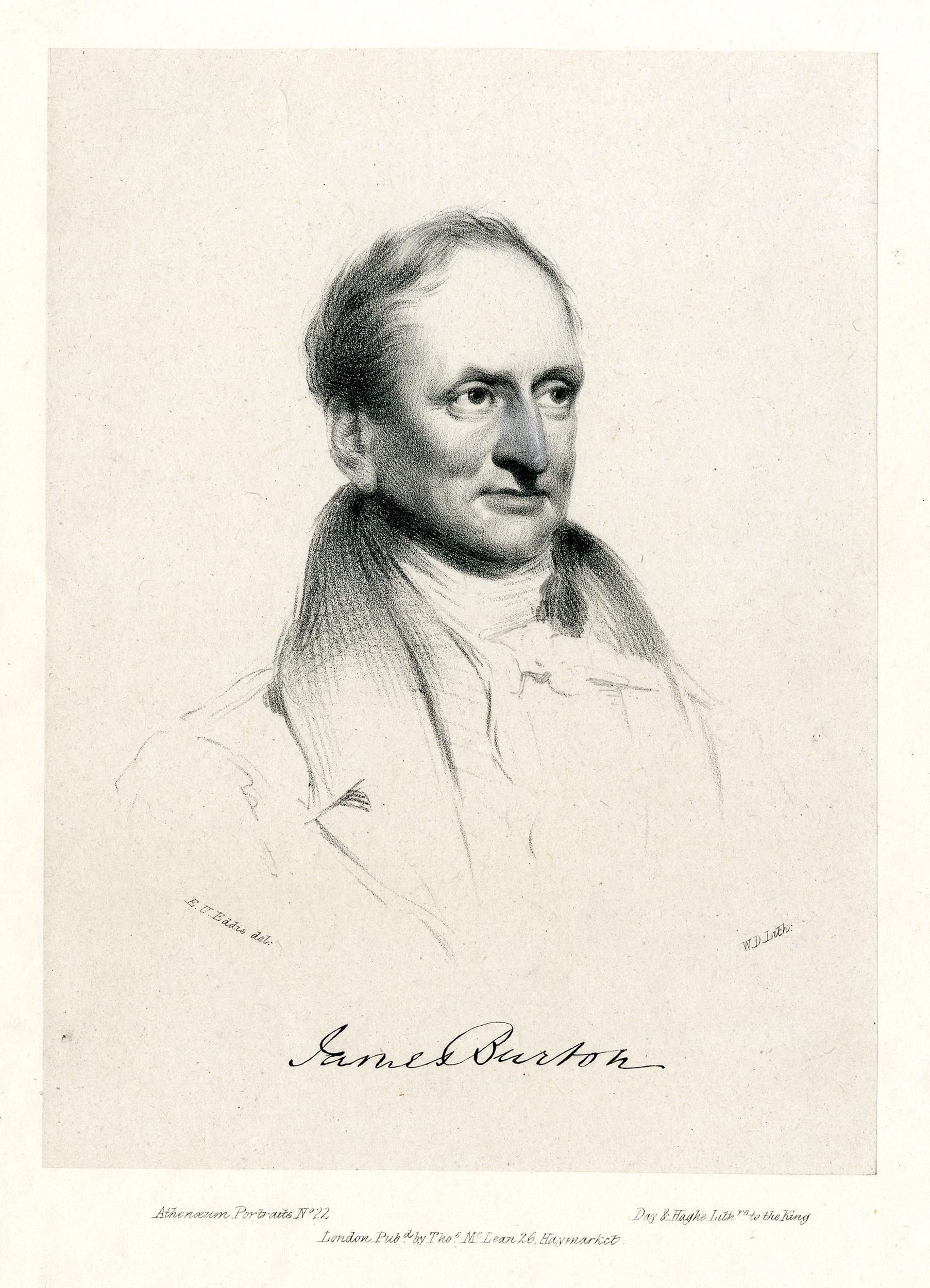
- James Burton (1761 - 1837), the most successful property developer of Regency and of Georgian London.
- Born: 29 July 1761; Strand, London, England
- Died: 31 March 1837 (aged 75); St Leonards-on-Sea, England
- Education: Homeschooled
- Occupations: Property developer; architect; gunpowder manufacturer
- Notable work: Bloomsbury; Regent Street; Regent Street St. James; St. James; Swallow Street; Regent's Park; Russell Square; Bedford Place; Bloomsbury Square; Tavistock Square; Chester Terrace; Cornwall Terrace; York Terrace; Clarence Terrace; St Leonards-on-Sea
- Children: 10 that survived infancy including: James Burton (Egyptologist); Henry Burton (physician); Decimus Burton
- Parents: William Haliburton (1731–1785) (father); Mary Johnson (1735–1785) (mother)
- Relatives: Thomas Chandler Haliburton (cousin); Lord Haliburton (cousin); George Augustus Eliott, 1st Baron Heathfield (cousin); Henry Marley Burton (grandson); Constance Mary Pott (1862 - 1957) (great-granddaughter)

Lieutenant-Colonel James Burton (previously James Haliburton) (29 July 1761 – 31 March 1837) was the most successful property-developer of Regency and of Georgian London, in which he built over 3000 properties in 250 acres. Between 1792 and 1802, he spent over £400,000 (about £30 million in 21st-century money) on the Foundling Hospital Estate alone.

He built most of Bloomsbury (including Bedford Place, Russell Square, Bloomsbury Square, Tavistock Square, and Cartwright Gardens), and St John's Wood, Regent Street, Regent Street St. James, Waterloo Place, St. James's, Swallow Street, Regent's Park (including its Inner Circle villas, in addition to Chester Terrace, Cornwall Terrace, Clarence Terrace, and York Terrace). He financed, and his company built, designs of John Nash at Regent's Park (most of which were designed by his son Decimus Burton) to the extent that the Commissioners of Woods and Forests described him, not Nash, as 'the architect of Regent's Park'. He also founded the town of St Leonards-on-Sea which is now part of Hastings.

Burton and his sons were members of London high society. He was an early member of the Athenaeum Club, London, whose clubhouse his company built to a design by his son Decimus Burton, who became the club's "prime member". Burton was a friend of Princess Victoria (the future Queen Victoria), and of the Duchess of Kent. He was Master of the Worshipful Company of Tylers and Bricklayers, and Sheriff of Kent.

In addition to the famous architect Decimus Burton, Burton's sons included the pioneering Egyptologist and libertine James Burton Junior, and the physician Henry Burton who discovered the Burton line. He was the grandfather of Constance Mary Fearon, who was the founder of the Francis Bacon Society.

The Burtons' London mansion The Holme (which was designed by his son Decimus) was described by architecture critic Ian Nairn as 'a definition of Western civilization in a single view'. James Burton also built the Burtons' Tonbridge mansion Mabledon.

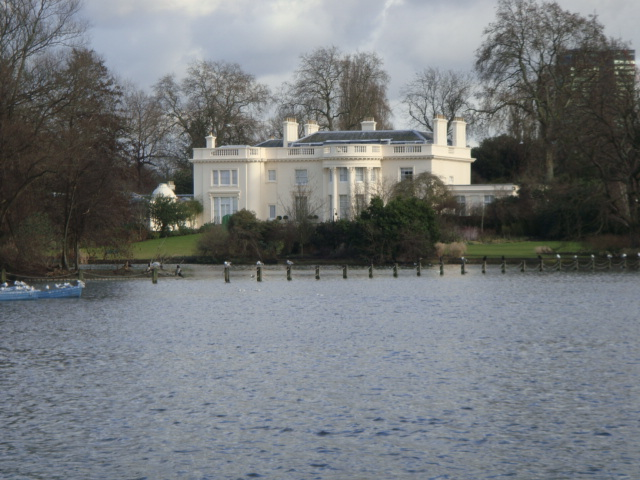
The Burtons' mansion, The Holme of Regent's Park, which was designed by Burton's son Decimus Burton, has been described as 'one of the most desirable private homes in London' by the architectural scholar Guy Williams.

== Family ==
James Burton was born in the Strand, London, as James Haliburton, on 29 July 1761. He was the son of William Haliburton (1731–1785), who was Scottish and from Roxburghshire, who descended from John Haliburton (1573 – 1627) from whom Sir Walter Scott, 1st Baronet, was maternally descended. Burton's paternal great-grandparents were The Rev. James Haliburton (1681 – 1756) and Margaret Eliott who was an aunt of George Augustus Eliott, 1st Baron Heathfield.

Burton was a cousin of the Canadian author and British MP Thomas Chandler Haliburton, and thereby of the Canada First founder Robert Grant Haliburton and the civil servant Arthur Lawrence Haliburton, 1st Baron Haliburton, who was the first Canadian to be raised to the Peerage of the United Kingdom.

Burton's mother was Mary Foster (who was previously Mary Johnson; 1735–1785), whom his father married in 1760, and who was the daughter of Nicholas Foster of Kirkby Fleetham, Yorkshire. William Haliburton and Mary Foster had two sons, James and another who died in infancy. James (b. 1761) was christened with the name 'James Haliburton' at Presbyterian Chapel, Soho, London. He shortened his surname to Burton in 1794, between the births of his fourth and fifth children.

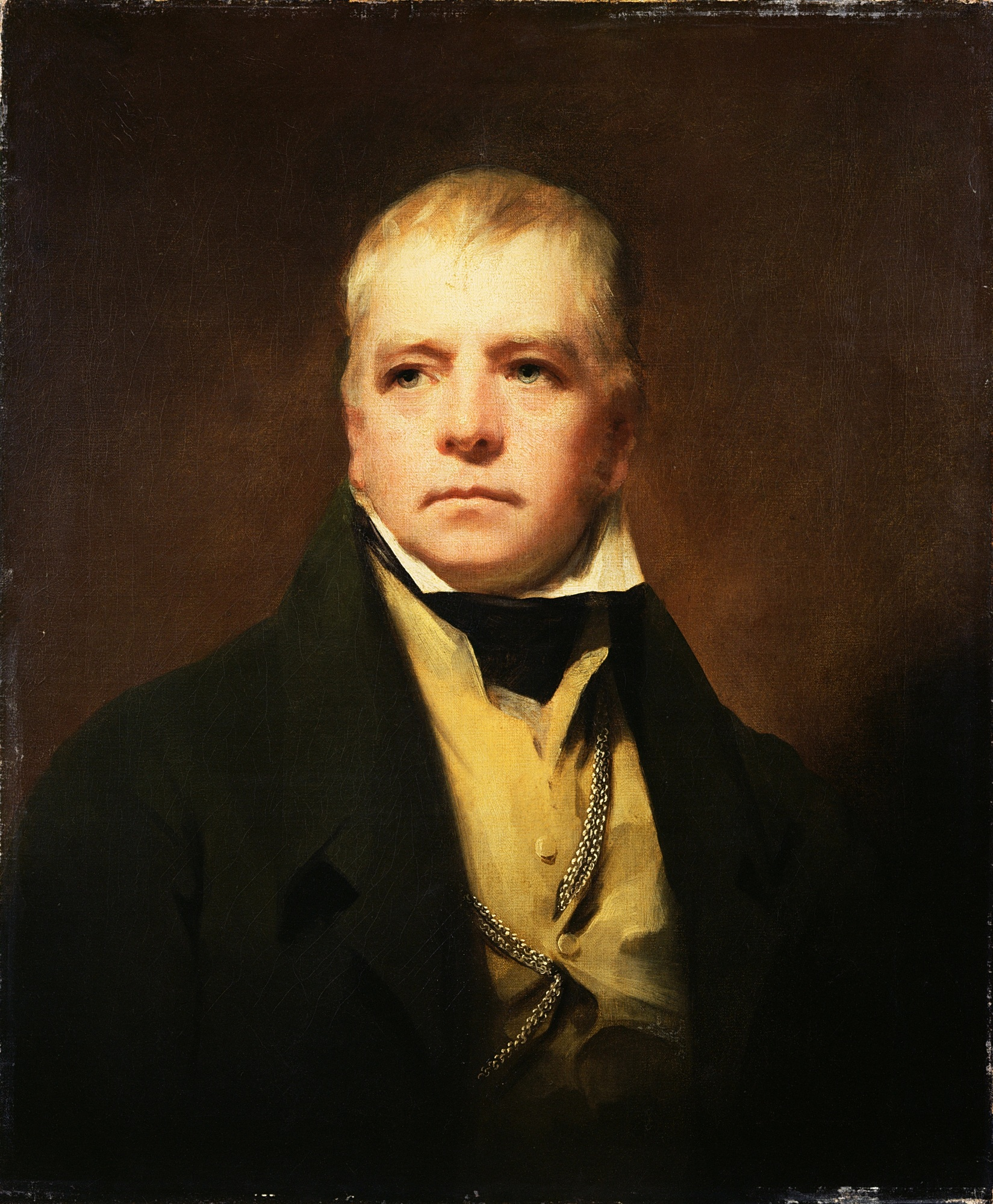
Portrait of Sir Walter Scott by Henry Raeburn, 1823. Burton was a cousin of the poet Sir Walter Scott, 1st Baronet.

== Education ==
James was educated at a day-school in Covent Garden before he was privately tutored, including in architecture. In July 1776 he was articled to a surveyor named James Dalton, with whom he remained for six years, until 1782, when he commenced with speculative construction projects, in some of which Dalton was his partner.

== Significant property developments ==
- Bloomsbury: including the Foundling Hospital Estate on which he built 586 houses from 1789, and spent over £400,000 (about £30 million in 21st-century money), between 1792 and 1802. These included Brunswick Square, Guilford Street, and Mecklenburgh Square(on which he built 600 houses); Bloomsbury Square (where the remaining north side are Burton's original houses); Russell Square; Bedford Place; Montague Street; Tavistock Square; Tavistock House (for himself); Cartwright Gardens (which were originally named Burton Crescent, after him); and Burton Street and Burton Crescent (which were named after him).
- St John's Wood
- Regent Street: Burton built 191 of the houses of Regent Street, and their joining archways. Five of the largest blocks of Regent Street were purchased by Burton in 1817. Burton's houses on Regent Street are No. 4 to No. 12; No. 17 to No. 25; No. 106 to No. 128; No. 132 to No. 154; No. 133 to No. 167; No. 171 to No. 195; and No. 295 to No. 319. These were built, together with Carlton Chambers, between 1817 and 1820. He also built between Leicester Street and No. 129 Swallow Street in 1820. He built the east side of Regent Street in 1821, and the west side of Regent Street, between the Quadrant and Oxford Street, and its archways, in 1822. He built north of Old Burlington Street, and the east side of the street between Chapel Court and the entrance to the King Street Chapel SW1, in 1822.
- Regent Street St. James (Lower Regent Street).
- Waterloo Place, St. James's, whose facades Burton modelled on those of the Place Vendome in Paris, between 1815 and 1816.
- Regent's Park, including the Inner Circle villas; Cornwall Terrace (1821); York Terrace; Clarence Terrace (1823); and Chester Terrace (1825).
- The Holme, Inner Circle, Regent's Park, (1818) The mansion of the Burton family, designed by his son Decimus Burton and built by James Burton's company. It has been described as 'one of the most desirable private homes in London' by architectural scholar Guy Williams, and the architectural critic Ian Nairn described it as 'a definition of western civilization in a single view'.
- St Leonards-on-Sea (1827 - 1837).
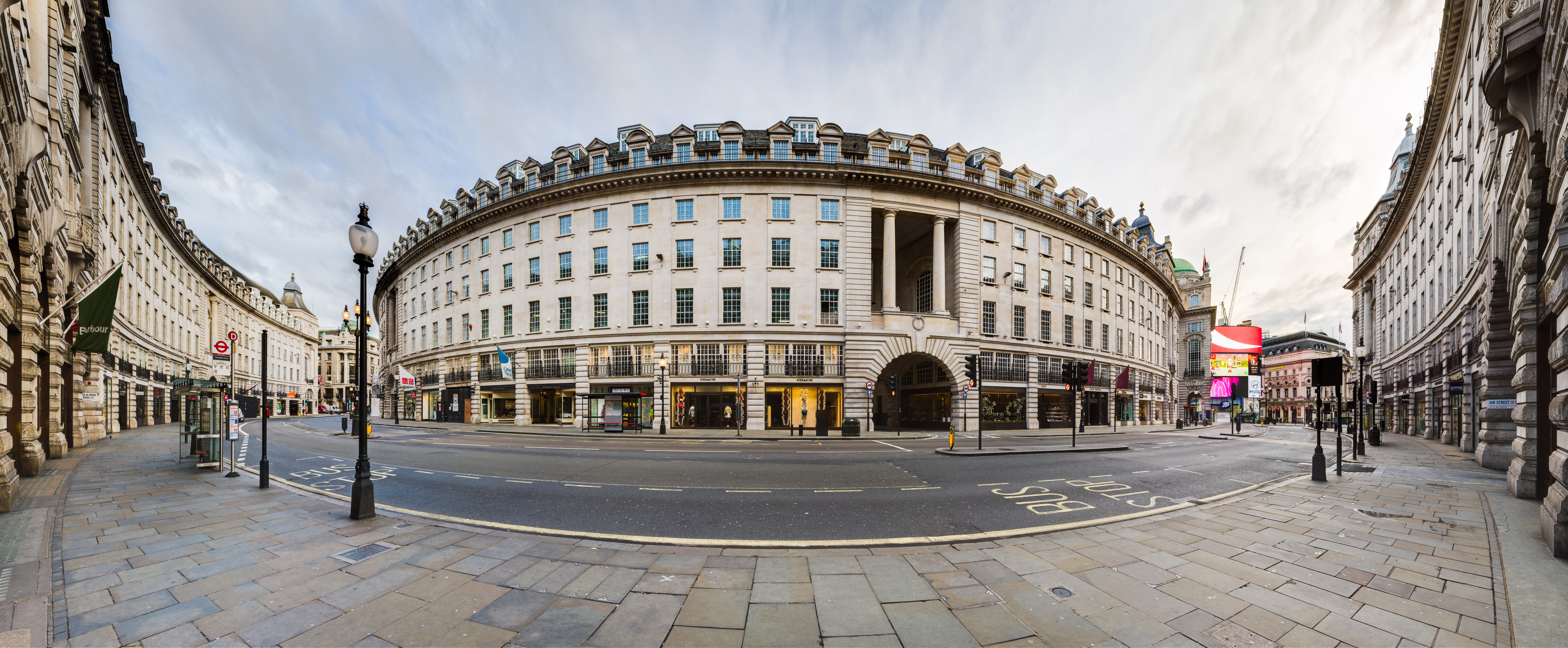
Regent Street

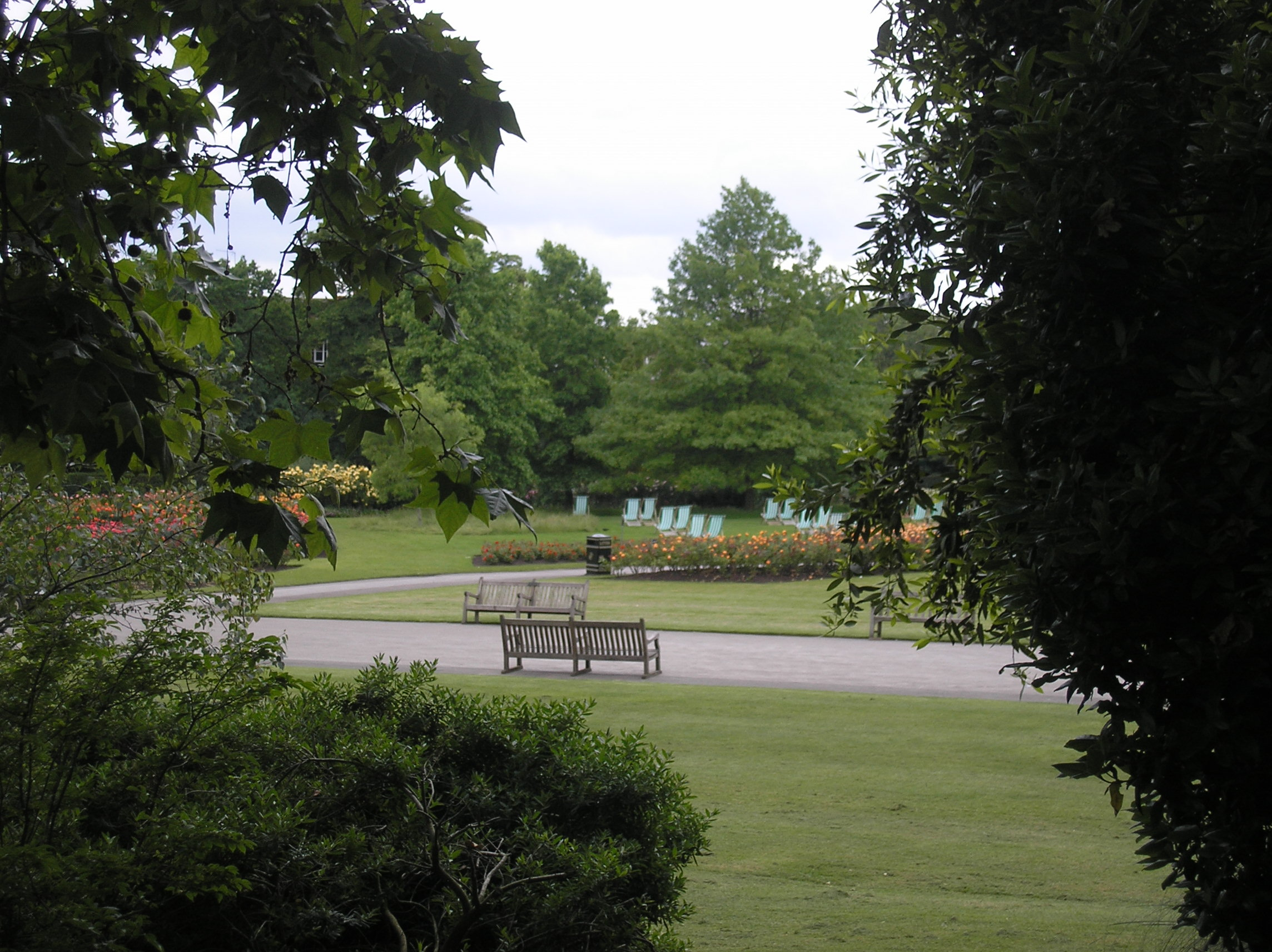
Regent's Park, designed by his son Decimus Burton

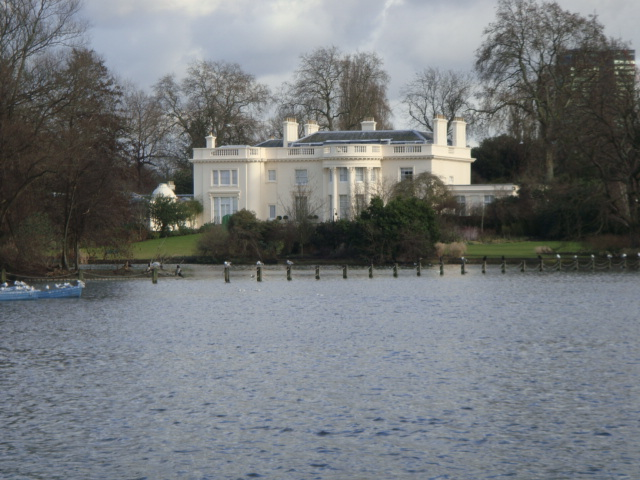
The Holme, the Burton family mansion in Regent's Park, designed by his son Decimus Burton

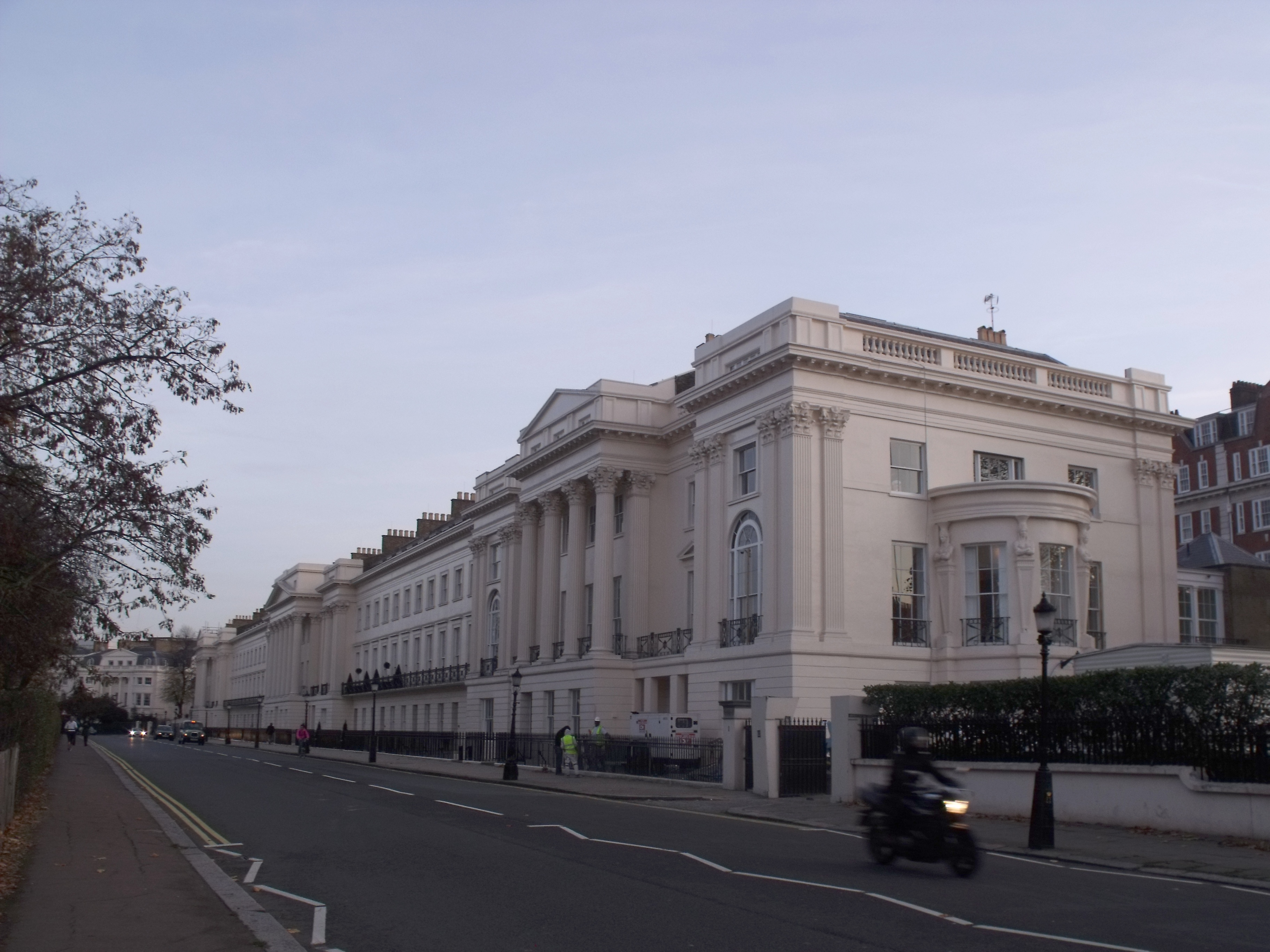
Cornwall Terrace, designed by his son Decimus Burton

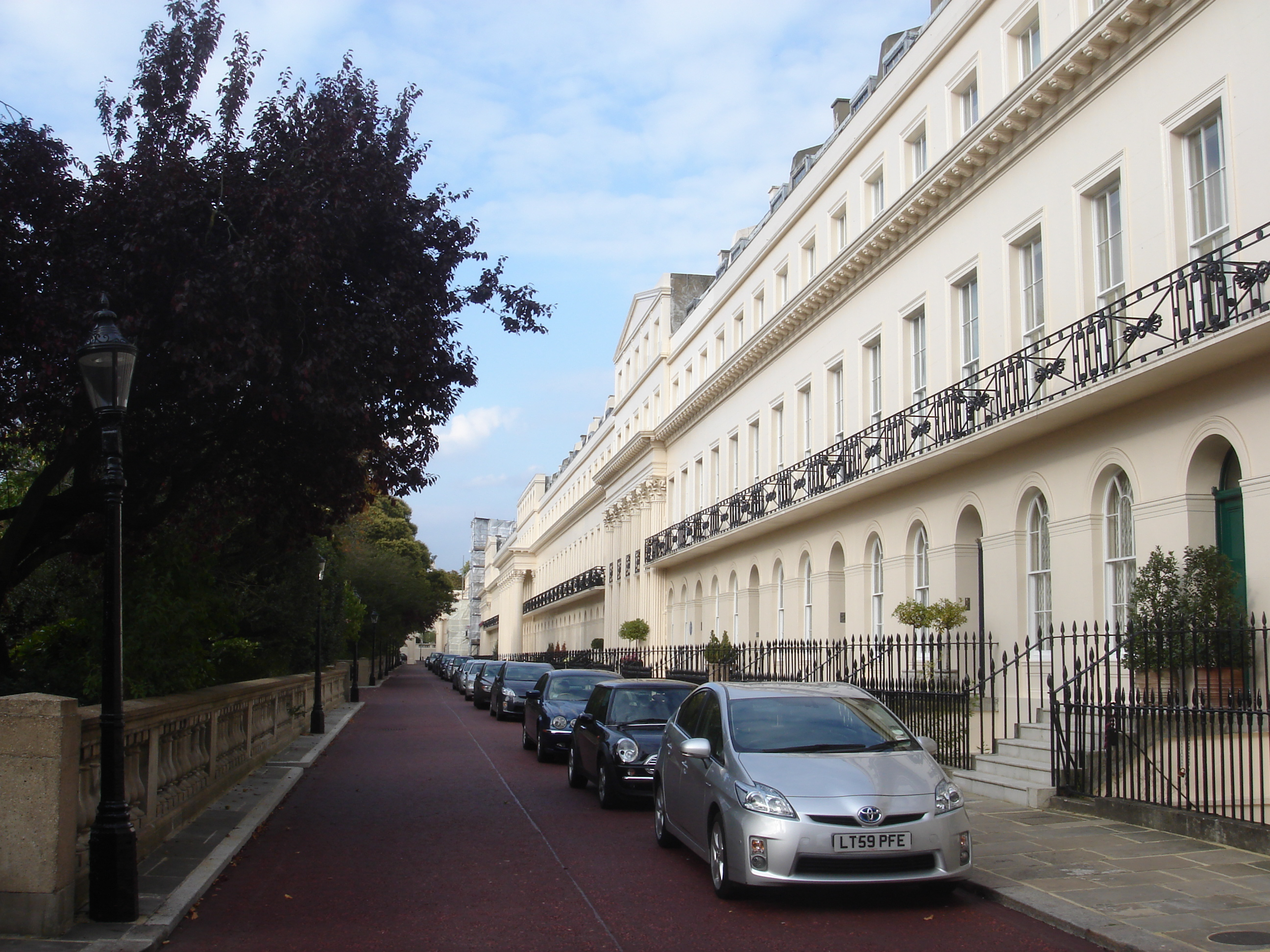
Chester Terrace, designed by his son Decimus Burton

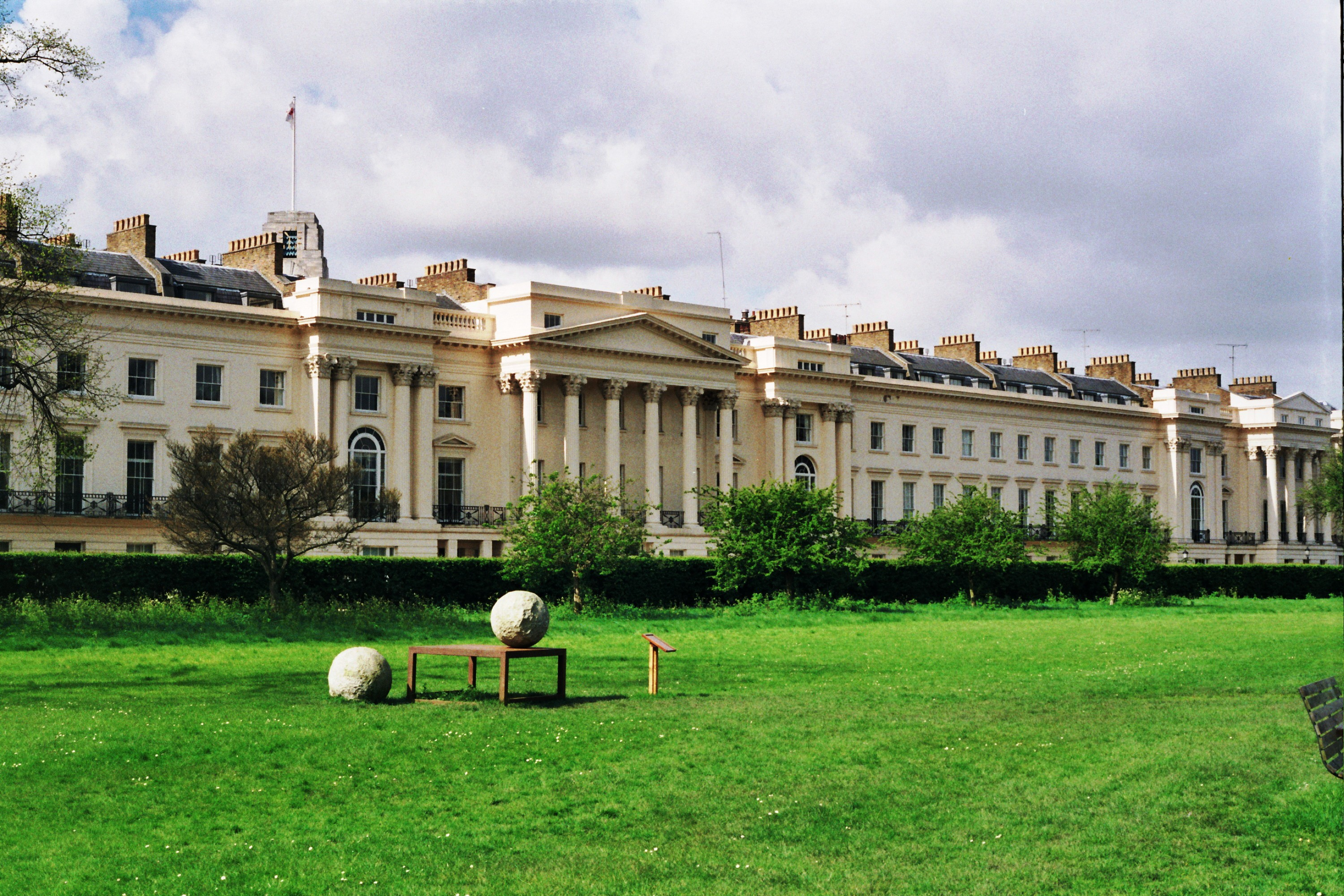
York Terrace, designed by his son Decimus Burton

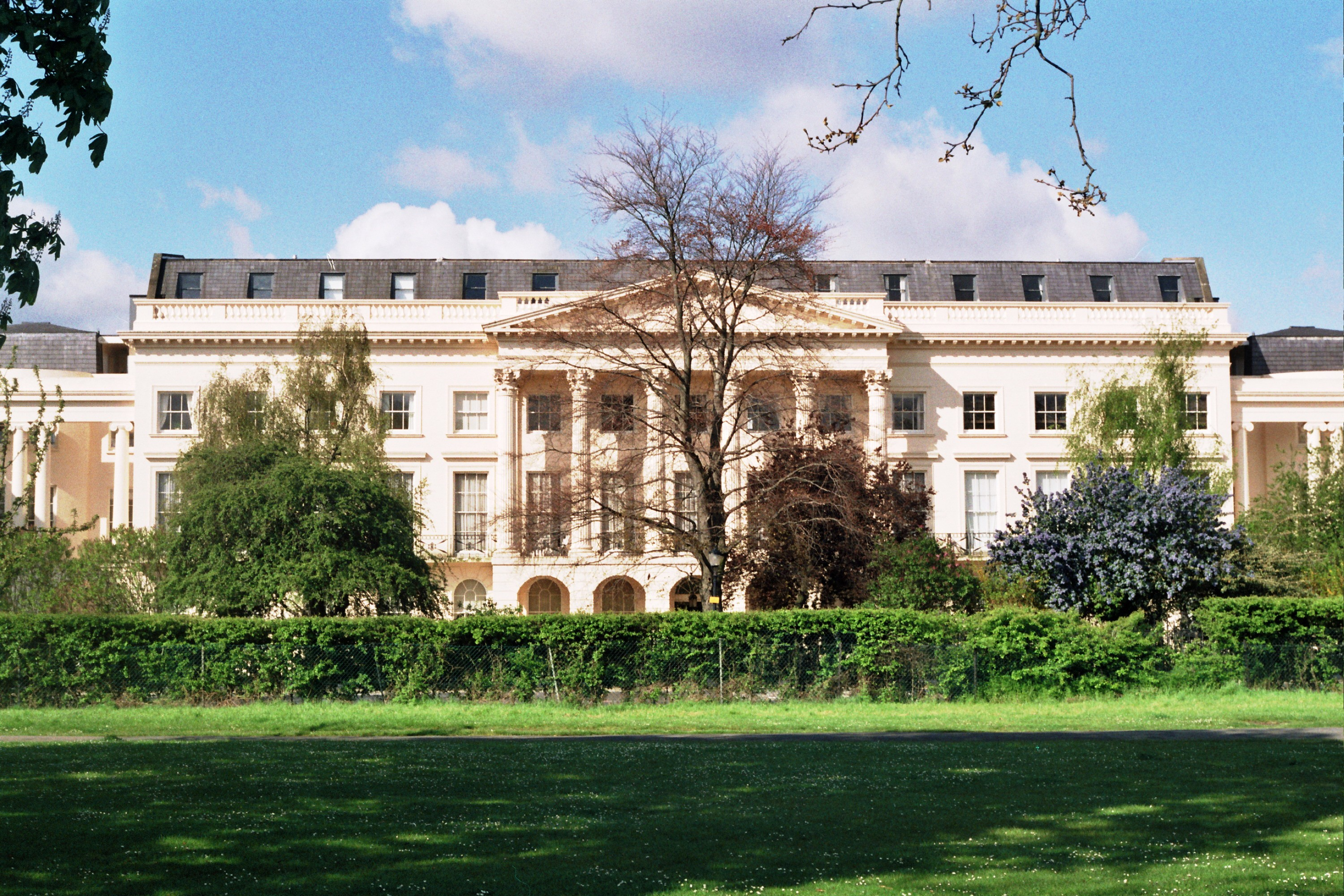
Clarence Terrace, designed by his son Decimus Burton

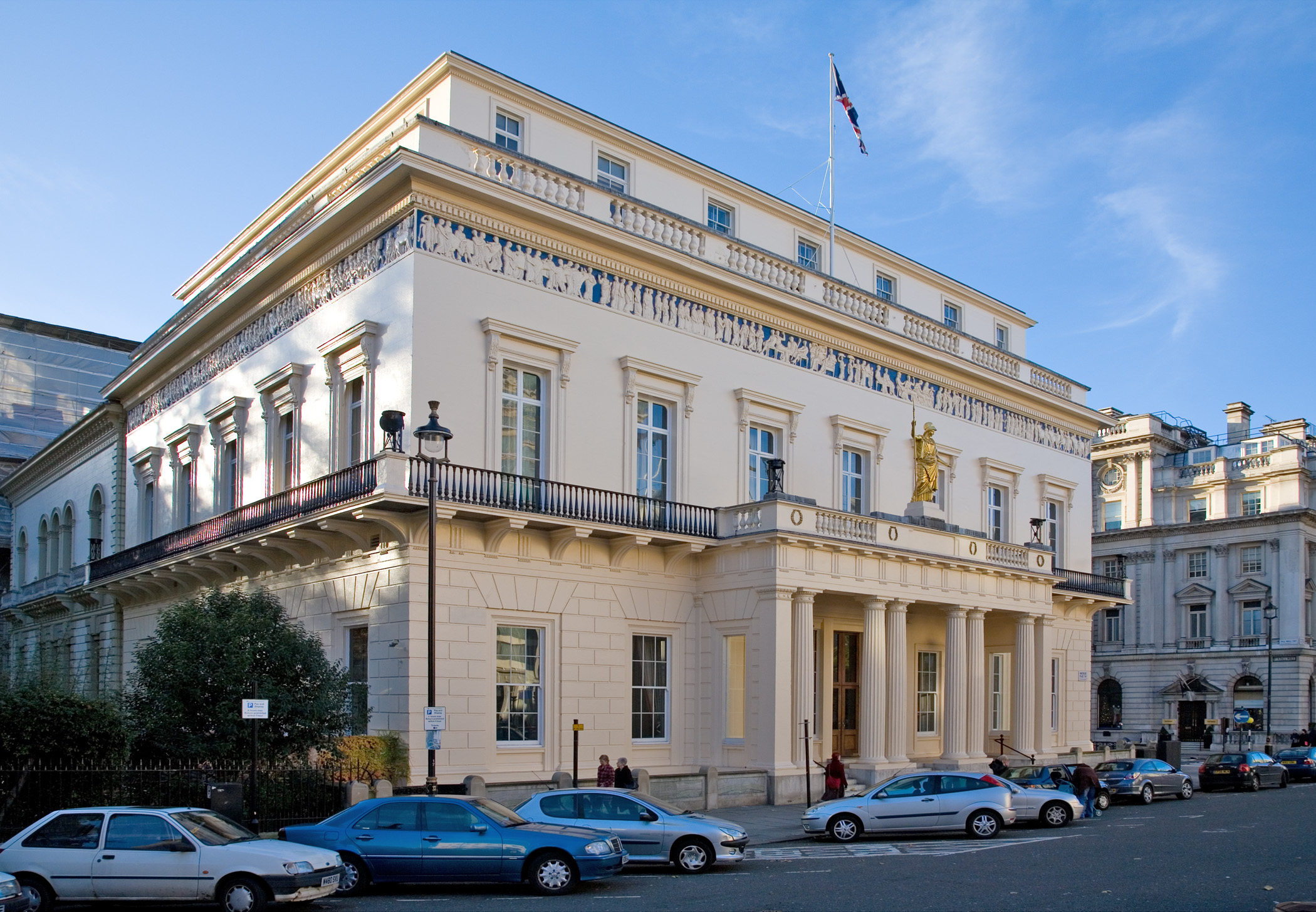
Athenaeum Club, London, designed by his son Decimus Burton, and of which he and Decimus were founders

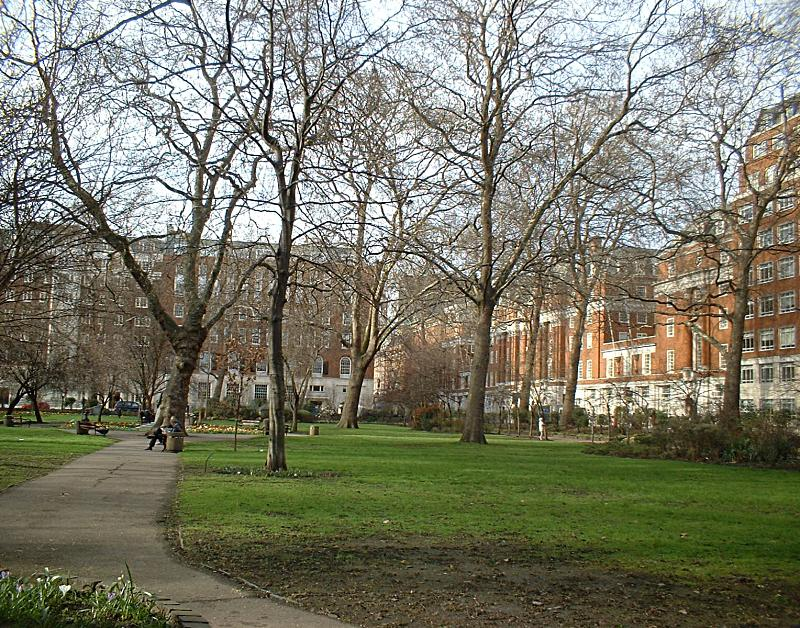
Tavistock Square

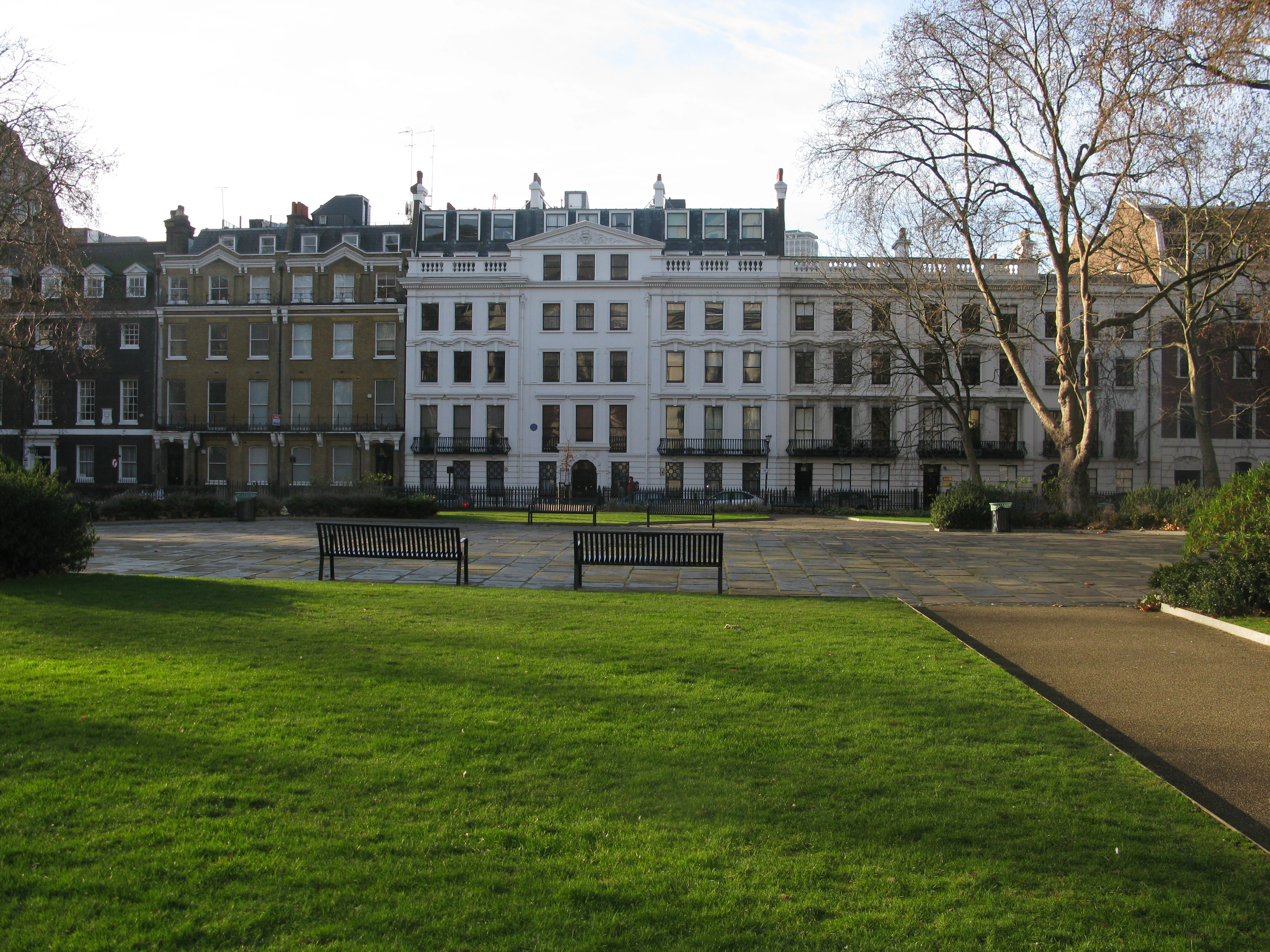
Bloomsbury Square

The architectural scholar Guy Williams contends, "He [Burton] was no ordinary builder. He could have put up an imposing and beautifully proportioned building, correct in every constructional detail, from the roughest of sketches tossed patronizingly at him by a "gentleman architect"". James's industriousness made him quickly 'most gratifyingly rich'. Burton worked as an 'Architect and Builder' in Southwark between 1785 and 1792. By 1787, Burton was lauded in Southwark: in 1786 he had built the Blackfriars Rotunda in Great Surrey Street (now Blackfriars Road) to house the Leverian Museum, for museum proprietor James Parkinson; this building subsequently housed the Southwark Institution.

Burton when aged 28 years proposed to build on the land that was made available by the Foundling Hospital, on which he had worked from 1789. He built 586 houses there from 1789, and spent over £400,000 (about £30 million in 21st-century money), on developments there between 1792 and 1802. He built the earliest part of the Royal Veterinary College in Camden Town in 1792 - 1793.

""He [Burton] was no ordinary builder. He could have put up an imposing and beautifully proportioned building, correct in every constructional detail, from the roughest of sketches tossed patronizingly at him by a "gentleman architect"".

— Architectural historian Guy Williams, about James Burton (b. 1761), in 1990.

Between 1790 and 1792, he asked the Governors of the Foundling Hospital for a permission to exclusively build the whole of Brunswick Square, but they declined to waive their rule of prohibition of any one speculator to develop more than a small proportion of the land, and granted Burton only land on the south side of Brunswick Square and part of Guilford Street. Subsequently, however, Burton expanded that holding by further purchases until he became the most extensive builder on the Hospital's Estate, and owned most of its western property. He between 1792 and 1802 he built 586 houses on the Estate, on which he spent over £400,000 in Georgian money, until the number of his constructions on the estate were 600. Samuel Pepys Cockerell, advisor to the Governors of the Foundling Hospital, commended Burton's excellence:

"Without such a man [James Burton Senior], possessed of very considerable talents, unwearied industry, and a capital of his own, the extraordinary success of the improvement of the Foundling Estate could not have taken place... By his own peculiar resources of mind, he has succeeded in disposing of his buildings and rents, under all disadvantages of war, and of an unjust clamour which has repeatedly been raised against him. Mr. Burton was ready to come forward with money and personal assistance to relieve and help forward those builders who were unable to proceed in their contracts; and in some instances he has been obliged to resume the undertaking and complete himself what has been weakly and imperfectly proceeded with...".

The contemporary Oxford Dictionary of National Biography contends that 'there is certainly no doubt about his energy and financial acumen'. Burton's industry made him 'most gratifyingly rich'. Throughout his development of the Foundling Hospital Estate, Burton was encouraged by Francis Russell, 5th Duke of Bedford, and his successor, John Russell, 6th Duke of Bedford, and by The Worshipful Company of Skinners, to develop the remainder of Bloomsbury and their adjacent estates. In 1800, Burton bought a portion of the London estate of the Dukes of Bedford, and demolished the Bedfords decaying London mansion, Bedford House, on the site of which he constructed family homes, including the houses of Bedford Place and Russell Square.

=== Style ===
"James Burton became adept at relieving the monotony of long residential terraces by allowing their central blocks to project slightly from the surfaces to each side, and by bringing forward, too, the houses at each end. [...] The ironwork in a classical style in James Burton's Bloomsbury terraces was, and often still is, particularly fine, though mass produced".

— Architectural historian Guy Williams, about James Burton (b. 1761), in 1990.

In these Bloomsbury developments, Burton again demonstrated his architectural flair, as Williams describes: "James Burton became adept at relieving the monotony of long residential terraces by allowing their central blocks to project slightly from the surfaces to each side, and by bringing forward, too, the houses at each end". Williams also records that "the ironwork in a classical style in James Burton's Bloomsbury terraces was, and often still is, particularly fine, though mass produced". The Bloomsbury Conservation Areas Advisory Council describes Burton's Bloomsbury terraces, "His terraces are in his simple but eloquent Neoclassical style, with decorative doorcases, recessed sash windows in compliance with the latest fire regulations, and more stucco than before". Jane Austen described Burton's new area of London in Emma: "Our part of London is so very superior to most others! - You must not confound us with London in general, my dear sir. The neighbourhood of Brunswick Square is very different from all the rest".

In 1970, John Lehmann predicted that Burton's Bloomsbury would soon disappear "except for a few isolated rows... to remind us of man-sized architecture in a vanished age of taste". Burton exhibited his design of the south side of Russell Square at the Royal Academy Exhibition of 1800. Burton's urban designs were characterized by spacious formal layouts of terraces, squares, and crescents.

In 1807 Burton expanded his Bloomsbury development north, and was also involved extensively in the early development of St John's Wood. He then left London for a project in Tunbridge Wells but returned in 1807 to build over the Skinners Company land between the Bedford Estate and the lands owned by the Foundling Hospital, where he built Burton Crescent (which was later renamed Cartwright Gardens), Burton Street, and Burton Place, which were named after him. These developments included, for himself, the Tavistock House, on land that is now occupied by the British Medical Association, where he lived until he moved to The Holme in Regent's Park, which was designed for him by his son Decimus Burton. Burton also developed the Lucas Estate.

Burton constructed some houses at Tunbridge Wells between 1805 and 1807. Burton developed Waterloo Place, St. James's, between 1815 and 1816. In 1815, James Burton took Decimus to Hastings, where the two would later design and build St Leonards-on-Sea, and, in 1816, Decimus commenced work in the James Burton's office. Whilst working for his father, Decimus was present in the design and construction of Regent Street St. James (Lower Regent Street). Simultaneously, George Maddox taught Decimus architectural draughtsmanship, including the details of the five orders. After his first year of tuition by his father and Maddox, Decimus submitted to the Royal Academy a design for a bridge, which was commended by the academy.

Between 1785 and 1823, before many of his Regent's Park terraces were complete, James Burton had constructed at least 2366 houses in London.

=== Relationship with John Nash ===
The parents of John Nash (b. 1752), and Nash himself during his childhood, lived in Southwark, where Burton became renowned for prescient speculative-building between 1785 and 1792. Burton built the Blackfriars Rotunda in Great Surrey Street (now Blackfriars Road) to house the Leverian Museum, for land-agent and museum-proprietor James Parkinson.

However, whereas Burton was vigorously industrious, and quickly became 'most gratifyingly rich', Nash's early years in private practice, and his first speculative developments, which failed either to sell or let, were unsuccessful, and Nash's consequent financial shortage was exacerbated by the 'crazily extravagant' wife, whom he had married before he had completed his training, until he was declared bankrupt in 1783. To resolve his financial shortage, Nash cultivated the acquaintance of Burton, and Burton patronized him.

James Burton was responsible for the social and financial patronage of the majority of Nash's London designs, in addition to for their construction. Architectural scholar Guy Williams has written, 'John Nash relied on James Burton for moral and financial support in his great enterprises. Decimus had showed precocious talent as a draughtsman and as an exponent of the classical style... John Nash needed the son's aid, as well as the father's'. Subsequent to the Crown Estate's refusal to finance them, James Burton agreed to personally finance the construction projects of John Nash at Regent's Park, which he had already been commissioned to construct: consequently, in 1816, Burton purchased many of the leases of the proposed terraces around, and proposed villas within, Regent's Park, and, in 1817, Burton purchased the leases of five of the largest blocks on Regent Street. The first property to be constructed by Burton in the vicinity of Regent's Park was his own mansion: The Holme, which was designed by his son, Decimus Burton, and completed in 1818. Burton's extensive financial involvement 'effectively guaranteed the success of the project', in return for which Nash promoted the career of Decimus Burton.

Such were James Burton's contributions to Regent's Parl that the Commissioners of Woods described James, not Nash, as 'the architect of Regent's Park'. The dominant architectural influence of most of the Regent's Park constructions (including Cornwall Terrace, York Terrace, Chester Terrace, Clarence Terrace, and the villas of the Inner Circle, all of which were constructed by James Burton's company) was Decimus Burton, not John Nash who was only architectural 'overseer' for Decimus's projects. Decimus ignored Nash's advice to develop the Terraces in his own style, to the extent that Nash unsuccessfullt sought the demolition and rebuilding of Chester Terrace. Decimus also designed No. 3 and No. 4 Carlton House Terrace.

James Burton's historically underestimated imperative contribution to the West End of London has been acknowledged since the 20th century: including by Baines, John Summerson, Olsen, and Dana Arnold. Steen Eiler Rasmussen, in 'London: The Unique City', commended Burton's buildings but did not identify their architect. The ''Oxford Dictionary of National Biography'' contends that Burton were 'the most successful developer in late Georgian London, responsible for some of its most characteristic architecture', and The Burtons' St. Leonards Society that he were "probably the most significant builder of Georgian London".

== Gunpowder manufacturer ==
James Burton, from 1811, invested in the manufacture of gunpowder at Powder Mills, Leigh, which was managed his eldest son, William Ford, who directed sales of the product from his office in the City of London. The mills (which were initially known as the Ramhurst Powder Mills, and later as the Tunbridge Gunpowder Works) were established in 1811 in partnership with Sir Humphry Davy, who later sold his shares to the Burtons, who thereby became the sole owners of the mills or works. After the retirement of his father in 1824, William Ford became the sole owner of the mills until his death in 1856, by which the gunpowder business was inherited by his brother, Alfred, Mayor of Hastings.

== Development of St Leonards-on-Sea ==
In 1827, James Burton realised that the ancient Manor of Gensing, which was situated between Hastings and the Bulverhythe Marshes, could be developed. Decimus Burton advised against this prospective project of his father, which limited his supply of capital for his own development of the Calverley Estate, but James ignored him, bought it, and proceeded to build St Leonards-on-Sea as a pleasure resort for the gentry. James Burton designed the town 'on the twin principles of classical formality and picturesque irregularity', to rival Brighton. The majority of the first part of the town had been completed by 1830. In 1833, St. Leonards-on-Sea was described as 'a conceited Italian town'.

== Family homes ==
During 1800, in which his tenth child Decimus was born, James Burton Senior resided at the 'very comfortable and well staffed' North House in the newly built Southampton Terrace at Bloomsbury. He subsequently resided at Tavistock House, which later became the residence of Charles Dickens. Subsequent to the birth of his twelfth child, Jessy, in 1804, Burton purchased a site on a hill about one mile to the south of Tonbridge in Kent, where he constructed, to the designs of the architect Joseph T. Parkinson, in 1805, a large mansion which he named Mabledon House, which was described in 1810 by the local authority as 'an elegant imitation of an ancient castellated mansion'. The majority of the stone that Burton needed for Mabledon was quarried from the hill on which Mabledon was to be built, but Burton also purchased stone from the demolition of the nearby mansion Penhurst Place. He employed a bailiff and a gamekeeper, hosted balls and was invested as Sheriff of Kent for 1810. A diary written by James Burton, which records his activities between 1783 and 1811, is at Hastings Museum and Art Gallery. The Burtons lived at Mabledon from 1805 to 1817.

From 1818, Burton resided at The Holme, Regent's Park, which has been described as 'one of the most desirable private homes in London', which was designed by James's son Decimus, and built by his own company. The Holme was the second villa in Regent's Park, and the first to be either designed or constructed by the Burton family. The hallmark of the Burton design is the large semi-circular bay that divided the principal elevation and that had two storeys. The original villa also had a conservatory of polygonal form, which used wrought iron glazing bars, which then had been only recently patented, instead of the customary wooden bars. The first villa to be constructed in the park was St. John's Lodge by John Raffield.

The Burton family had residences and offices at 10, 12, and 14 Spring Gardens, St. James's Park, at the east end of The Mall, that were constructed by Decimus. The Burton family also had offices at Old Broad Street in the City of London, and at Lincoln's Inn Fields (at which Septimus Burton was a solicitor at Lincoln's Inn and trained William Warwick Burton.

== Personal life ==
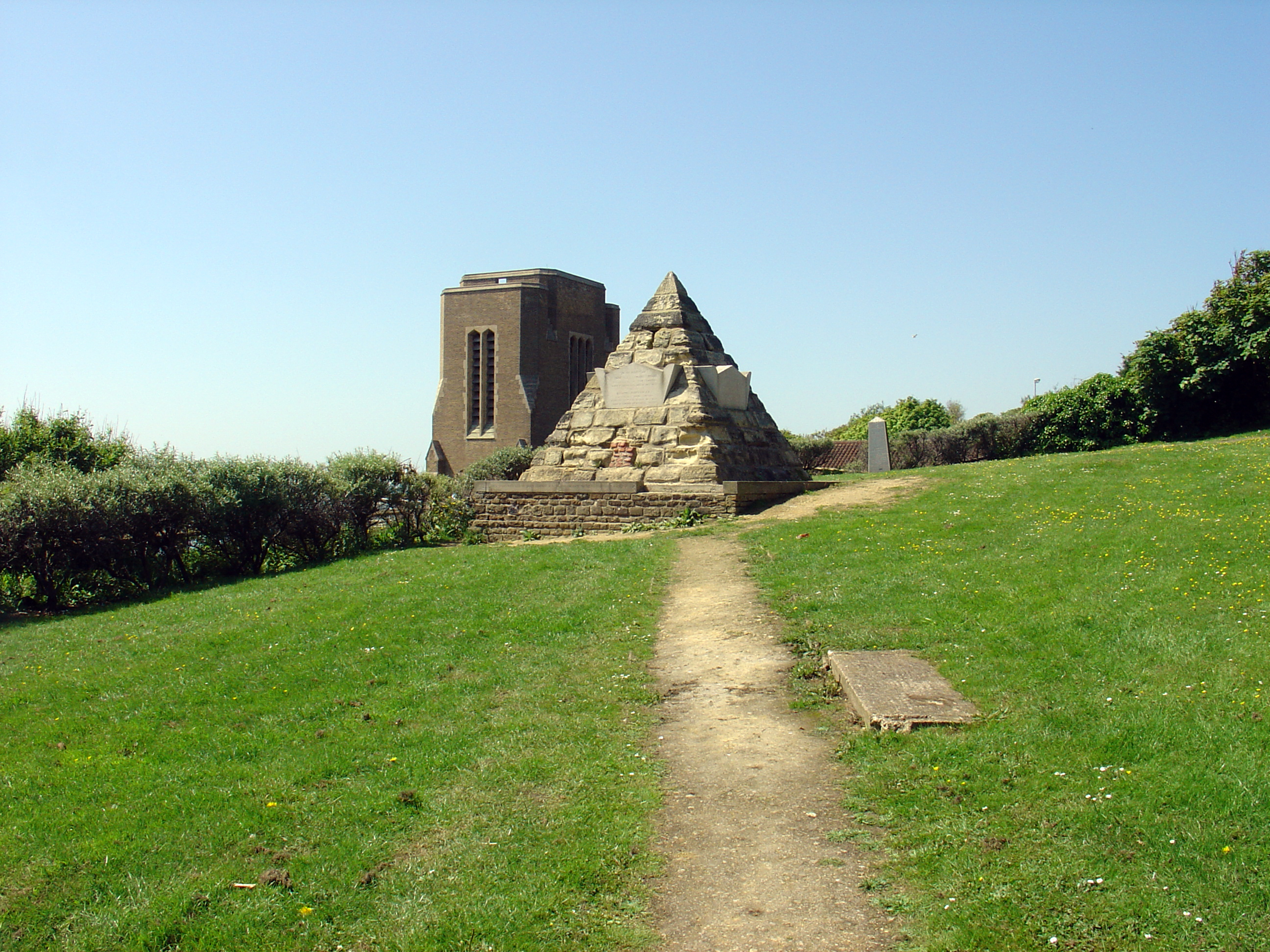
Pyramidal Tomb of James Burton (1761 – 1837) and Burton family at St Leonards-on-Sea, England

Burton was Master of the Worshipful Company of Tylers and Bricklayers in 1801 to 1802. In 1804, in response to the possibility of invasion by France, Burton recruited from his workforce 1600 volunteers, whom he named the Loyal British Artificers, of which he became Lieutenant-Colonel Commandant. The rally-point of Burton's Loyal British Artificers was to be the Tottenham Court Road. Burton attended the funeral of Horatio Nelson in 1806.

James Burton was an early member of the Athenaeum Club, London, as was his son, Decimus Burton, who has been described as the 'prime member of the Athenaeum' by architectural scholar Guy Williams who there 'mixed with many of the greatest in the land, meeting the most creative as well as those with enormous hereditary wealth'. During 1820, Burton, his wife, and his children dined and attended the opera with George Bellas Greenough to finalise Greenhough and Decimus's designs. James and Decimus Burton were 'on excellent terms' with Princess Victoria and with the Duchess of Kent. The Princess and the Duchess laid the foundation stone of a Decimus Burton School in Tunbridge Wells, and, in autumn 1834, stayed for several months, at Decimus's invitation, at James Burton's villa at St Leonards-on-Sea, until several weeks into 1835.

Elizabeth Burton died at St Leonards-on-Sea on 14 January 1837. James Burton died at St Leonards-On-Sea on 31 March 1837. James is buried in a pyramidal tomb in the churchyard of St Leonards-on-Sea, the town that he had designed and created, where a commemorative monument was erected.

=== Marriage and children ===
On 1 March 1783, at St. Clement Danes, Strand, London, James Burton married Elizabeth Westley (12 December 1761 – 14 January 1837), of Loughton, Essex, who was the daughter of John and Mary Westley. They had six sons and six daughters. Their first four children were registered with the surname 'Haliburton'. James and Elizabeth changed their surname to 'Burton' between the birth of their fourth child and the birth of their fifth child. Burton and his children were armigerous.

Ten of Burton's children were alive at the time of his 1837 death at which his vocational legacy was divided in three between his precocious sons William Ford Burton (who inherited the financial management), and Decimus Burton (who inherited the architectural practice), and Alfred Burton (who inherited the societal patronages). James Burton Junior the Egyptologist, Septimus Burton the solicitor, and Henry Burton the physician, started vocational disciplines that did not have any precedent in those of their father.

1. William Ford (11 January 1784 – 18 October 1856). James Burton Senior's eldest son did not attend university as a consequence of an injury that was caused by a fall from his horse during 1806. He instead managed the office of the Powder Mills, Leigh, Medway, (which were initially known as the Ramhurst Powder Mills, and later as the Tunbridge Gunpowder Works) that he founded with Sir Humphry Davy during 1811. He was sole owner of the gunpowder mills or works between 1824 and his death in 1856, when they were inherited by his brother, Alfred, Mayor of Hastings. William Ford lived at St John's Wood, and at The Holme, and at South Lodge, St. Leonards-on-Sea. He had two illegitimate sons by Mary Moore (b. 1784): the architect Captain Henry Marley Burton FRIBA (1821 - 1880) (who was the father of the architect Edgar Burton); and William Warwick Burton (d. 21 October 1861), of Lincoln's Inn Fields, who was articled as a solicitor to William Ford's brother Septimus (1794 - 1842). William Warwick Burton had three children: William Edgar Burton, Edmund Burton, and Jessy Burton. Jessy Burton married the banker James Holmes Parson and their daughter Aimée Elizabeth married the Welsh international chartered shipbroker Ernest William Jones.
2. Emma Elizabeth (1785 - 1785). She died from smallpox.
3. Eliza (29 September 1786 – 6 February 1877). She lived for a time at No. 36 Marina and later at No. 5 West Hill in St. Leonards-on-Sea. She did not marry.
4. James Junior FGS (22 September 1788 – 22 February 1862). Pioneering British Egyptologist.
5. Emily (10 August 1791 – 20 May 1792). She died from a vaccination.
6. Jane (4 April 1792 – 11 December 1879). She married Thomas Walker (1786 - 1867) (who changed his surname to Wood in 1817) at Tonbridge, in 1812. She had one son George James (1813–1831), and three daughters, Emily (1815–1892), Helen (1816–1903), and Rose Anna (1818-1847) who lived at North Lodge St. Leonards-on-Sea.
7. Septimus (27 July 1792 – 25 November 1842). Septimus was in 1810 articled at Lincoln's Inn to John Wittet Lyon and founded his legal practice, at Serle Street, Lincoln's Inn Fields, that managed his father's business. Septimus lived at Chiswick Grove, Middlesex. Septimus in 1824 married Charlotte Lydia Elizabeth Middleton (1801 - 1840) by whom he had two sons. Their son Walter (7 March 1840 - 18 April 1840) died in infancy. Their son Arthur (1830-1867) in 1860 married Lilian Margaret Robertson. Septimus died on 20 November 1842 and is commemorated with his wife at Old Chiswick Cemetery.
8. Octavia (b. 20 May 1796 - d. 1846) She married the banker Edmund Hopkinson (1789-1869) at Tonbridge in 1813, by whom she had no issue.
9. Henry FRCP (27 February 1799 – 10 August 1849). Physician who discovered the Burton line. He in 1826 married Mary Elizabeth Poulton (1800 - 1829) at St. George's, Bloomsbury, by whom he had no issue.
10. Decimus FRS FRSA FSA FRIB (30 September 1800 – 14 December 1881). Famous architect.
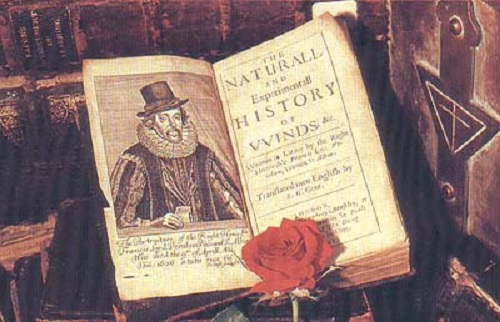
  Burton's granddaughter, Constance Mary Fearon, was the founder of the Francis Bacon Society.
11. Alfred (Senior) (18 June 1802 – 24 April 1877) JP, Mayor of Hastings, and manager of the Burton family estates. He trained in architecture and worked as the secretary of his brother Decimus and to Thomas Wood (previously Walker) who was the husband of his sister Jane Burton. In St. Leonards-on-Sea, where he lived at 64 Marina, Alfred (Senior) was Steward of the Races; President of the Mechanics Institute; Vice-President of the Infirmary; and Trustee of Hastings and Flimwell Turnpike. He was a member of the Queen's Royal St. Leonards Archers, and of the Oriental Club, to which he donated books and pictures, and to which his brother Decimus and nephew Henry Marley Burton made architectural additions. Alfred (Senior) married Anna Delicia Adams (1811 - 1897) in 1843, who was the sister of Major-General Henry William Adams CB, and of Major-General Frank Adams CB. They had one son, Alfred Henry (1845–1917), JP DL, of St. Leonard's Lodge, St. Leonard's-on-Sea, and 18 Manson Place, Queen's Gate, who was High Sheriff of Sussex in 1902, and one daughter, Louisa Charlotte (1849–1873), who did not marry. Alfred Henry (1845–1917) married Ellen Amelia Dickson (1851 - 1923) by whom he had four sons. Their son Robert Cecil Burton (1882 - 1915), who was educated at Winchester College and Oriel College, Oxford, and was a captain of the 2nd Battalion of the Rifle Brigade, with which he served in India and in France, where he was fatally wounded at the Battle of Neuve-Chapelle and died on 16 March 1915 in hospital at Boulogne, is buried at the east end of St Andrew's Churchyard, Fairlight, East Sussex, in a family tomb. Their son Stephen John Burton (1882 - 1917), who was educated at Winchester College and Royal Military College, Sandhurst, and was a major of the Coldstream Guards, with which he served in Egypt and in France and Belgium. He was killed in action on 20 July 1917, at Boezinge, overlooking the Yser Canal, in the Ypres Salient, whilst second-in-command of 1st Battalion Coldstream Guards. He is buried in Grave I F 2 of the Canada Farm Cemetery. Their son Arthur Collingwood Burton, who was educated at Winchester College, was a lieutenant in the Coldstream Guards who died of wounds at Belmont in the Second Boer War on 26 November 1899. Their son Maurice George Walter Burton, who was educated at Winchester College and at Trinity College, Cambridge, and lived at Kensington and 5 Cheyne Place, Chelsea, was a captain of the British Army who died on active service on 29 January 1942. He is buried at St Andrew's Churchyard, Fairlight, East Sussex. Alfred (Senior) left an estate that was worth less than £12,000 (about £1 million in 21st-century money).
12. Jessy/Jessie (12 April 1804 – 1844), of Regent's Park, who married in 1833 John Peter Fearon (1804–1873) who was a lawyer of the Inner Temple and of Great George Street, Westminster, who founded Fearon & Co Solicitors (as Fearon & Clabon) which continues to exist. Jessy/Jessie Burton and John Peter Fearon were married by the groom's brother The Ven. Henry Fearon (d. 1885), Archdeacon of Leicester, Rector of Loughborough, and Fellow of Emmanuel College, Cambridge. Jessy/Jessie and John Peter Fearon had three daughters: Jessy/Jessie Tyndale (1834–1910); Constance Mary (1835–1915) (who married and had issue with Henry Pott, a brother of the hymnwriter Francis Pott); and Ethel Anna (1839–1901) (who married and had issue with Thomas Ayscough); and one son Francis (1837–1914) (who married and had issue with Julia Mary Woodward) who worked for Fearon & Clabon. Jessy/Jessie Burton's daughter Constance Mary Fearon was (under her marital name Mrs Henry Pott) the founder of the Francis Bacon Society and an author who advocated that Francis Bacon, 1st Viscount St. Alban, was the author of most of the works that were ascribed to William Shakespeare. Constance Mary Fearon (or Mrs Henry Pott) was also the mother of the artist Constance Mary Pott (1862 - 1957).
