= Hardyman =

Name

Hardyman is a first and last name. Notable people with it include:

- Hardyman Lamit (born 1986), Bruneian footballer
- Henry Hardyman Parker (born 1963), English Royal Navy officer
- Lucius Ferdinand Hardyman (1771–1834), British Royal Navy officer
- Paul Hardyman (born 1964), English footballer
