= York Terrace =

Street next to Regent's Park in London

Coordinates: 51°31′25″N 0°9′10″W

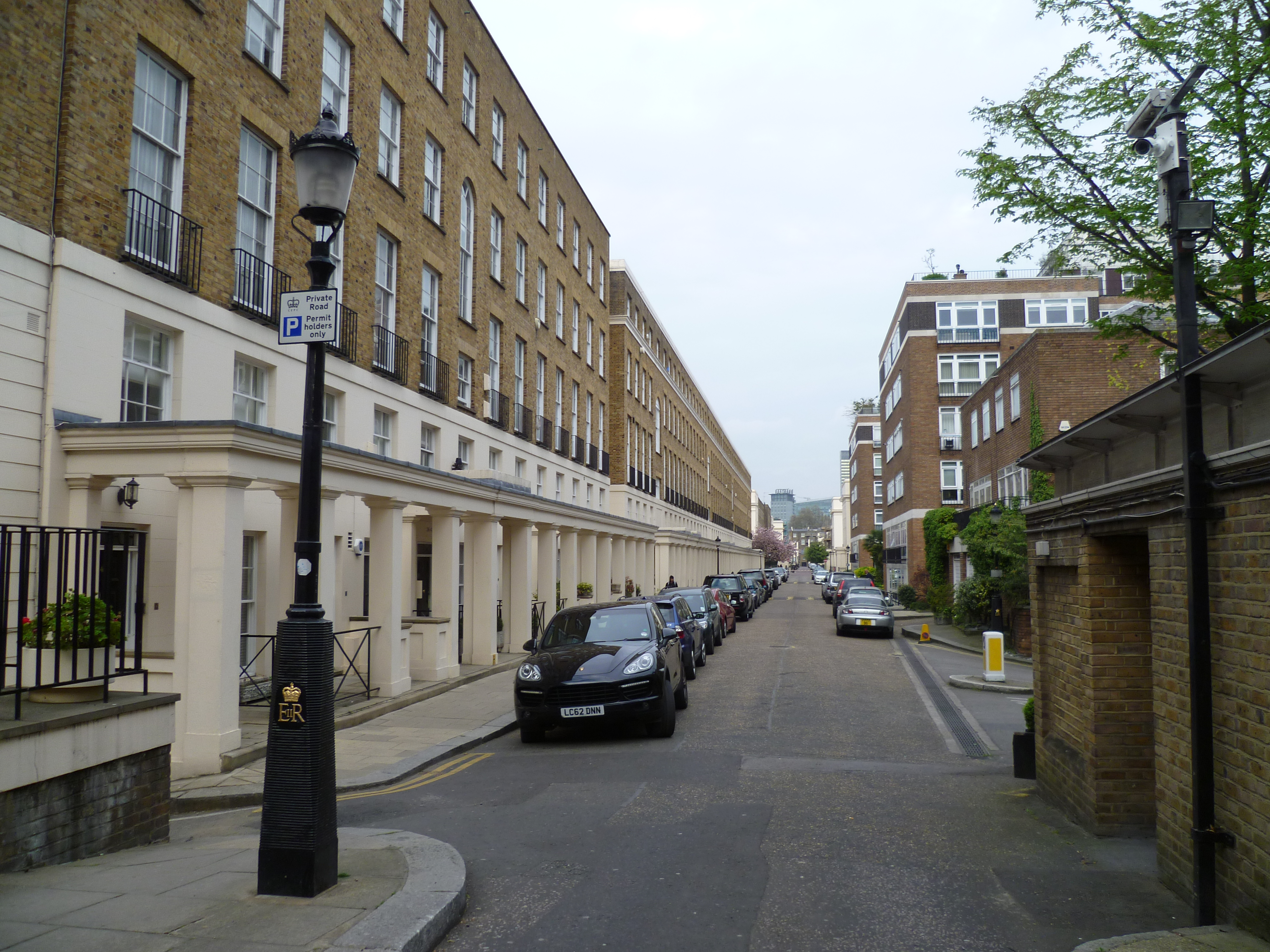
York Terrace West, NW1, in April 2015

York Terrace overlooks the south side of Regent's Park in Marylebone, City of Westminster, England. York Terrace West is a Grade I listed building. York Terrace East contains Grade II listed buildings. 1–18 York Terrace East is listed at Grade I.

== History ==
It consists of two separate Regency style terraced buildings, York Terrace East and York Terrace West, which are joined by York Gate (built 1813) which frames St Marylebone Parish Church. York Terrace is one of the park's principal buildings.

As with Cornwall Terrace and Clarence Terrace, York Terrace was constructed by the company of James Burton, to a design by John Nash and Decimus Burton.

There are two blue plaques on York Terrace East, at the Doric Villa at Nos. 19 and 20, for the psychoanalyst Ernest Jones and the actor-manager Sir Charles Wyndham respectively.
