= Lucius Ferdinand Hardyman =

Royal Navy officer (1771–1834)

Rear-Admiral Lucius Ferdinand Hardyman CB
- Born: 1771
- Died: 17 April 1834 (aged 62–63); Cornwall Terrace, Regent's Park, London
- Military career
- Allegiance: Great Britain; United Kingdom
- Service: Royal Navy
- Rank: Rear-Admiral
- Conflicts: French Revolutionary Wars; Battle of Dominica; Action of 28 February 1799; Anglo-Spanish War; Battle of Monte Video; Napoleonic Wars; Battle of the Basque Roads

Lucius Ferdinand Hardyman, CB (1771–1834) was an officer in the Royal Navy. He saw action as a midshipman at the battle of Dominica in 1782, was first lieutenant of the Sibylle during her capture of the Forte in 1799, and commanded the Unicorn at Monte Video in 1807, and at the Basque Roads in 1809. He was made a CB in 1815 and a rear-admiral in 1830.

== Career ==
Lucius Ferdinand Hardyman was son of Thomas Hardyman (1736–1814), a captain in the British Army. His six brothers were all in the British Army, and three attained the rank of general. He entered the Royal Navy in 1781 on board the Repulse, with Captain Thomas Dumaresque, and in her was present in the battle of Dominica, on 12 April 1782. In June he followed Dumaresque to the Alfred, and returned to England in 1783. From 1791 to 1794 he was serving on board the Siren, with Captains Manley and Graham Moore.

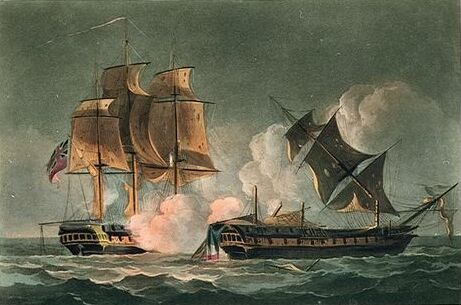
Thomas Whitcombe: Capture of La Forte, 28 February 1799

On 5 March 1795 he was promoted to the rank of lieutenant, and appointed to the Sibylle under the command of Captain Edward Cooke. He was first lieutenant of the Sibylle when, on the night of 28 February–1 March 1799, she engaged the French frigate Forte, and succeeded to the command when Cooke was carried below mortally wounded. He conducted the action to a victorious issue, and was immediately afterwards promoted by Vice-admiral Rainier to command the prize. From the East India Company, and from the insurance companies of Calcutta and Madras, he received three swords of honour.

On 27 January 1800 he was advanced to post rank, and continued to command the Forte on the East India station till, on 29 January 1801, she struck on an unknown rock as she was going into the harbour of Jeddah, and became a total wreck. Hardyman was acquitted of all blame, but the master of the flagship, who was piloting her in, was sentenced to lose twelve months' seniority. In 1803 Hardyman commissioned the Unicorn frigate, which he commanded in 1805 on the West India station; in 1807 in the expedition against Monte Video under Sir Charles Stirling; and in 1809 in the Bay of Biscay under Lord Gambier, and was present at the destruction of the French ships in Basque Roads on 11 April, when the Unicorn was one of the few ships actively engaged. (Note: See Thomas Cochrane, 10th Earl of Dundonald.) He was afterwards transferred to the Armide frigate, which he commanded on the coast of France until the peace.

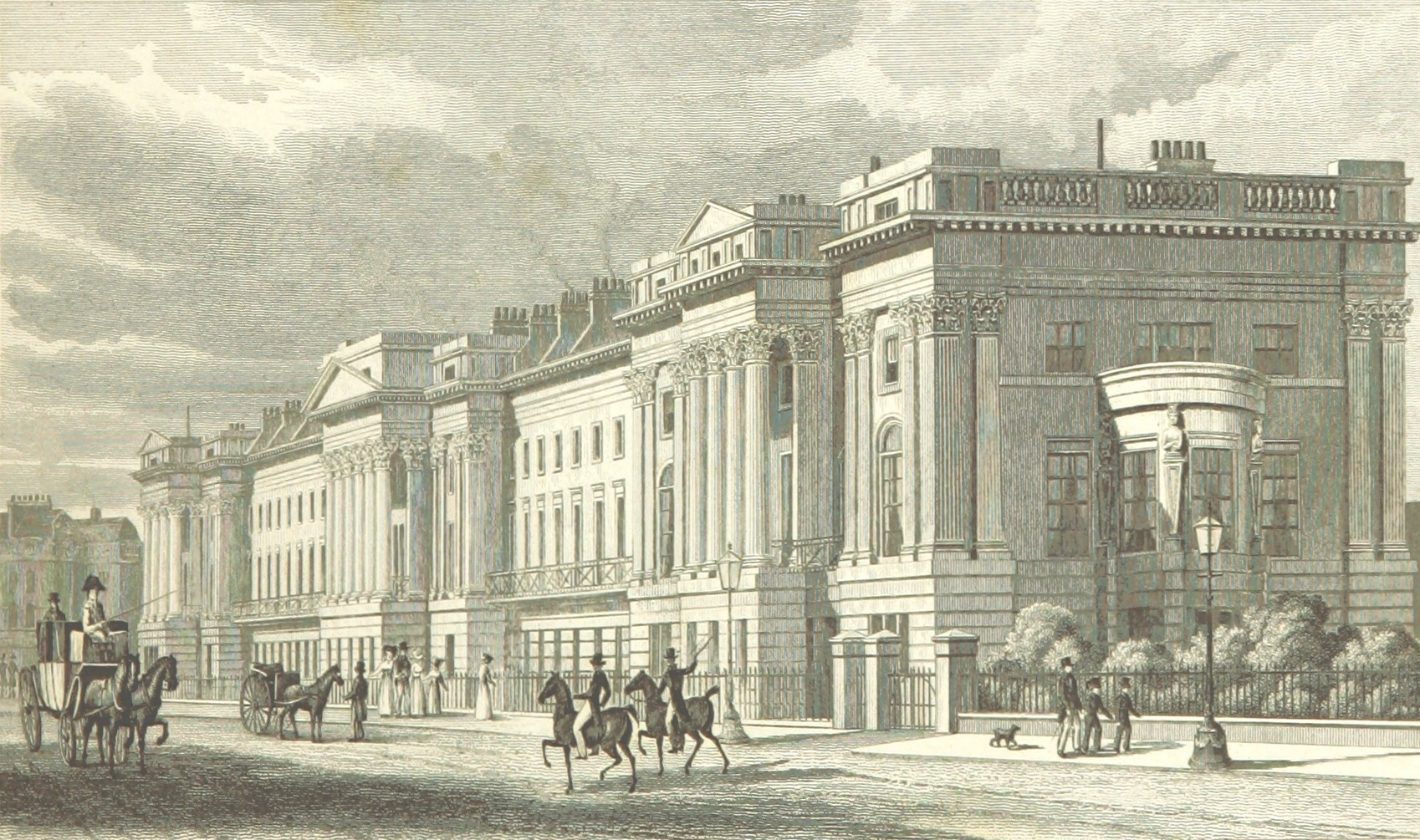
Cornwall Terrace in 1828

In 1815 he was made a CB; commanded the Ocean from 1823 to 1825 as flag-captain to Lord Amelius Beauclerk; and became a rear-admiral on 22 July 1830. Hardyman died at his residence, at Cornwall Terrace, Regent's Park, London, on 17 April 1834.

== Personal life ==
He married, in 1810, Charlotte, daughter of John Travers, a director of the East India Company, (Note: Cf. William Brown.) by whom he had one son, Lucius Heywood Hardyman, who became a lieutenant 5th Bengal Cavalry, and was killed in the retreat from Cabul in January 1842; he had also three daughters, of whom two were still living in 1890. His widow died, in her ninety-third year, in 1872.

== Sources ==
- James, William (1886). The Naval History of Great Britain. New ed. Vol. 4. London: Richard Bentley & Son. p. 279.
- Laughton, J. K.; Morriss, Roger (2004). "Hardyman, Lucius Ferdinand (1771–1834), naval officer". Oxford Dictionary of National Biography (online ed.). Oxford University Press. doi:10.1093/ref:odnb/12295. (Subscription, Wikipedia Library access or UK public library membership required.)

Attribution:

- This article incorporates text from a publication now in the public domain: Laughton, John Knox (1890). "Hardyman, Lucius Ferdinand". In Stephen, Leslie; Lee, Sidney (eds.). Dictionary of National Biography. Vol. 24. London: Smith, Elder & Co. p. 362.
