= The Holme =

Mansion in Regent's Park, London, England

Coordinates: 51°31′39″N 0°9′23″W

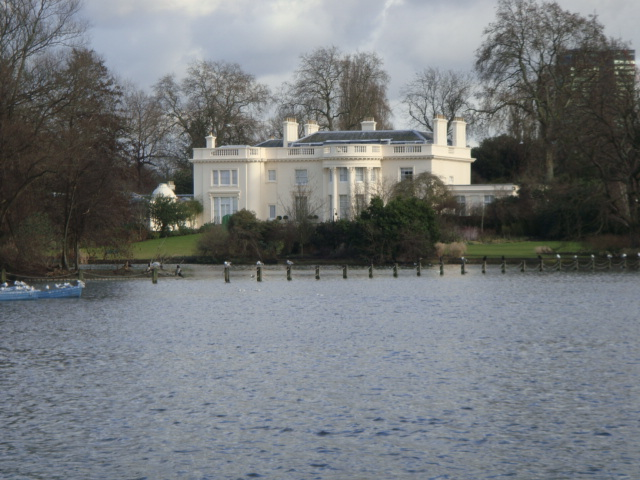
The Holme in 2009

The Holme (Saxon: "river island") is a mansion located on Inner Circle by Regent's Park in the City of Westminster, London, England. It was designed by Decimus Burton, as a residence for the Burton family, and built in 1818, by the company of James Burton, who subsequently lived there. It has been described as "one of the most desirable private homes in London" by architectural scholar Guy Williams. Architectural critic Ian Nairn wrote of the house, "If you want a definition of western civilization in a single view, then here it is".

In June 2026, the property was sold to Abbas Sajwani, an Emirati real estate developer and son of Hussain Sajwani.

== History ==
The Holme was the second villa to be built in Regent's Park, and the first of those to be designed or constructed by the Burton family. The house consists of two storeys above ground, as well as offices contained in a basement. The entrance is under an Ionic-style portico and pediments. It has a bow or rotunda decorated by four columns; the bow is surmounted by an attic, and is covered with a well-proportioned cupola. Renovations occurred in 1911 with the addition of wings by Bertie Crewe and again in 1935 when a balustrade replaced an existing dome.

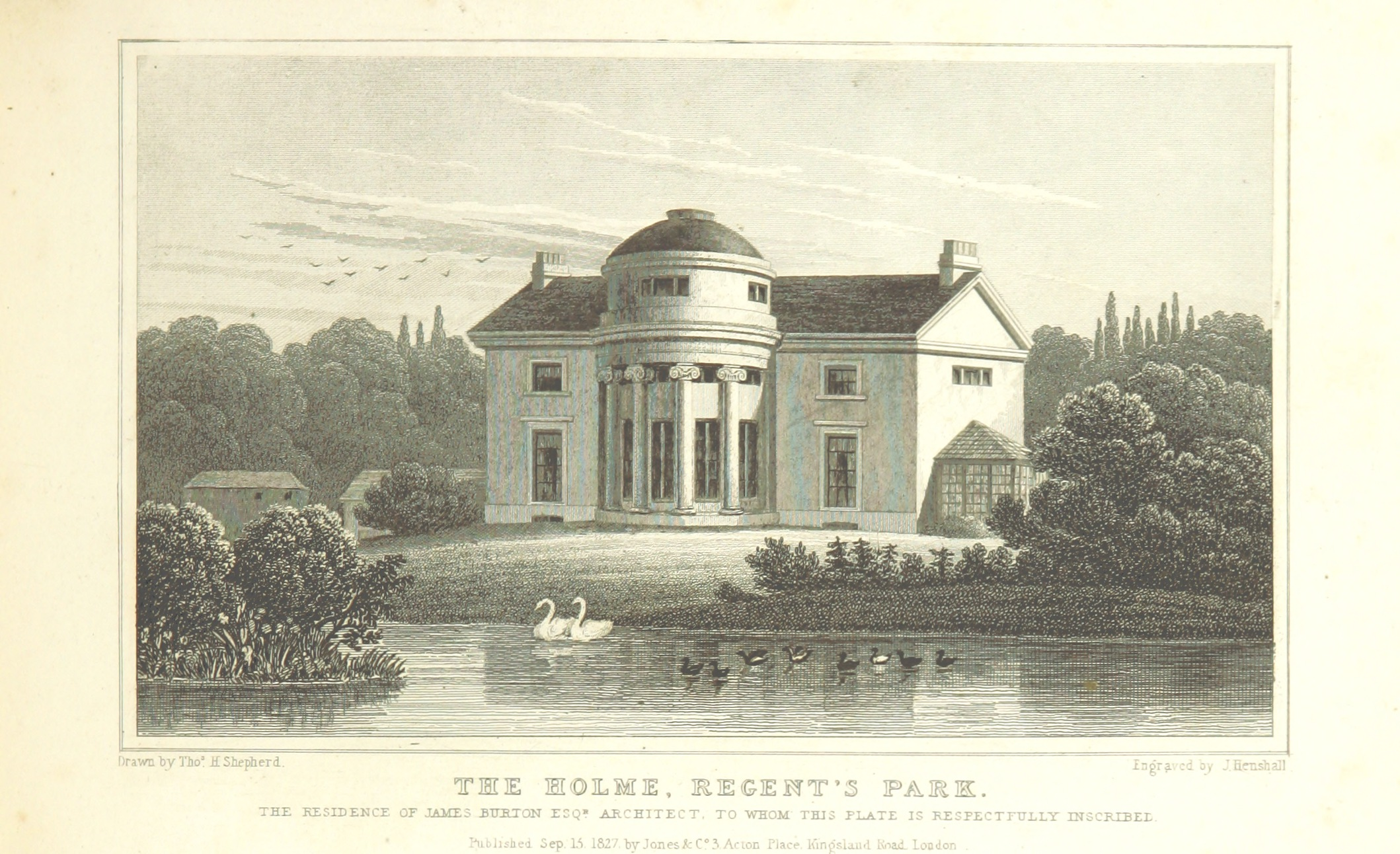
The Holme in 1827, drawn by Thomas H. Shepherd

Prior to 1984, The Holme was owned by the Crown Estate. The freehold of the land remains with the Crown. It was bought for £34 million in 1991 through the Guernsey-based company, Quendon Ltd and owned by the children of former Saudi defence minister, Prince Khaled bin Sultan al-Saud.

It was later seized by creditors reportedly after defaulting on a loan for a private jet. The jet was leased by Yuntian 10 Leasing Company, an Irish subsidiary of China Minsheng Bank, through a corporation in Bermuda. It was alleged the property was kept to manage arrears from loans whilst concealing the ultimate beneficiary of the property.

As of March 2023, the mansion was put up for sale by its then owner for a reported price of £250m, making it the most expensive private residence in the UK.

It was later sold for £139 million by Abdullah bin Khalid Al Saud, then Saudi Arabia's ambassador to Germany, to Zedra, a Luxembourgish corporate services firm that manages investments for wealthy people, in a deal with estate agent, Knight Frank, on 13 December 2024. The sale was enforced, due to arrears from a £160 million loan secured against the property, resulting in the property being put into receivership. The identity of the buyer was unknown, although reports suggested it was a US based "tech billionaire" and bought as a London base. The buyer was later revealed to be Leon Li, a Chinese crypto investor and the founder of Huobi (later known as HTX), via Zedra's UK subsidiary. In June 2026, 18 months after the previous sale, it was sold again for around £190 million. The buyer was later revealed to be Abbas Sajwani, an Emirati real estate developer and son of Hussain Sajwani, owner of DAMAC Properties. Sajwani financed the property with a mortgage from Deutsche Bank's Luxembourg branch.

== Bibliography ==
- Stourton, James (2012). Great Houses of London. London: Frances Lincoln. ISBN 978-0-7112-3366-9.
- "The Holme". members.lycos.co.uk/Catherine_Slater. Catherine Slater. Archived from the original on 4 January 2009.
