= Leopold Redpath =

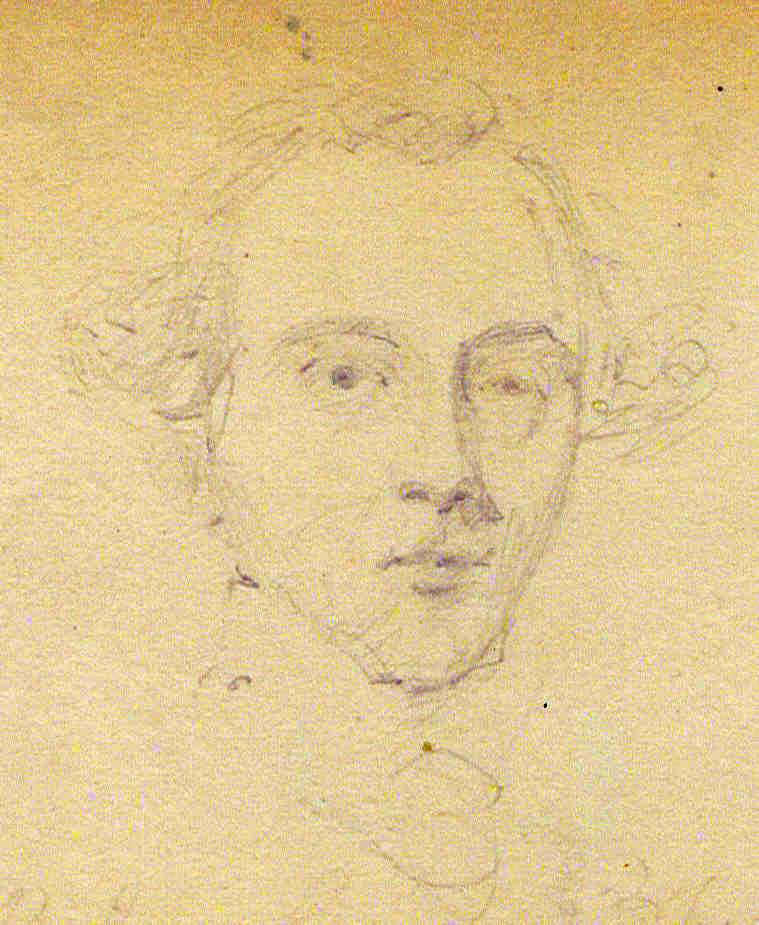
Leopold Redpath. Pencil drawing attributed to William Egley, 1839. National Portrait Gallery, London.

Leopold Redpath in The Chronicles of Newgate

Leopold Redpath (12 May 1816 - 1 May 1891) was a clerk of the Great Northern Railway Company who perpetrated a notorious fraud against his employers and was transported to Australia.
