= Worshipful Company of Tylers and Bricklayers =

Livery company of the City of London

- Motto: In God is all our trust, let us never be confounded
- Location: peripatetic
- Date of formation: 1568
- Company association: Bricklaying; roof tiling & slating; ceramic wall & floor tiling (including mosaic tiling)
- Order of precedence: 37th
- Master of company: David White
- Website: www.tylersandbricklayers.co.uk

The Worshipful Company of Tylers and Bricklayers is one of the ancient livery companies of the City of London. The organisation of Tylers (roof and floor tile layers) and Bricklayers existed in 1416; it was incorporated by a royal charter in 1568. Originally, the company possessed a monopoly over bricklaying within the City of London. Following the Great Fire of London, the king mandated that buildings be constructed with brick or stone instead of timber, leading to an influx of craftsmen from across England to assist with the extensive rebuilding efforts. This resulted in the effective termination of the company's monopoly. Today, like most livery companies, it supports its traditional crafts, primarily functioning as a charitable organisation. It supports various building schools, including the Building Crafts College in Stratford, London.

The Tylers' and Bricklayers' Company ranks thirty-seventh in the order of precedence of livery companies.

== Brief history ==
The earliest reference to the company is in 1416 though records show that a guild representing the crafts was in existence well before that time. The company's charter was granted in 1568. A City ordinance of 1570 defined its area of control as being within a radius of 15 miles of the City.

The company was successful with brick and tiles being widely adopted in place of timber and thatch. The Great Fire of 1666 led to a royal proclamation requiring their use. The scope and scale of the rebuilding programme was beyond the capacity of company members alone; craftsmen flocked in from elsewhere and the monopoly was broken. The succeeding years saw a continuing reduction in the influence and fortunes of the company which nonetheless retained ownership of a hall until the end of the 19th century and almshouses in Islington into the second half of the 20th century. Masters and liverymen of the company have ensured that it still plays its part in support of the City, its crafts and numerous charitable causes.

Two of the company's liverymen have served as Lord Mayor of London.

== Support for the crafts ==
The company supports three separate recognised crafts within the building industry. These are bricklaying, roof slating and tiling, and hard-surface wall and floor tiling – crafts. It awards prizes for excellence achieved by students on courses at vocational colleges and in The Corps of Royal Engineers, the company's link regiment, and also for success in craft competitions such as Skillbuild.
