= Cornwall Terrace =

Grade I listed architectural structure in London

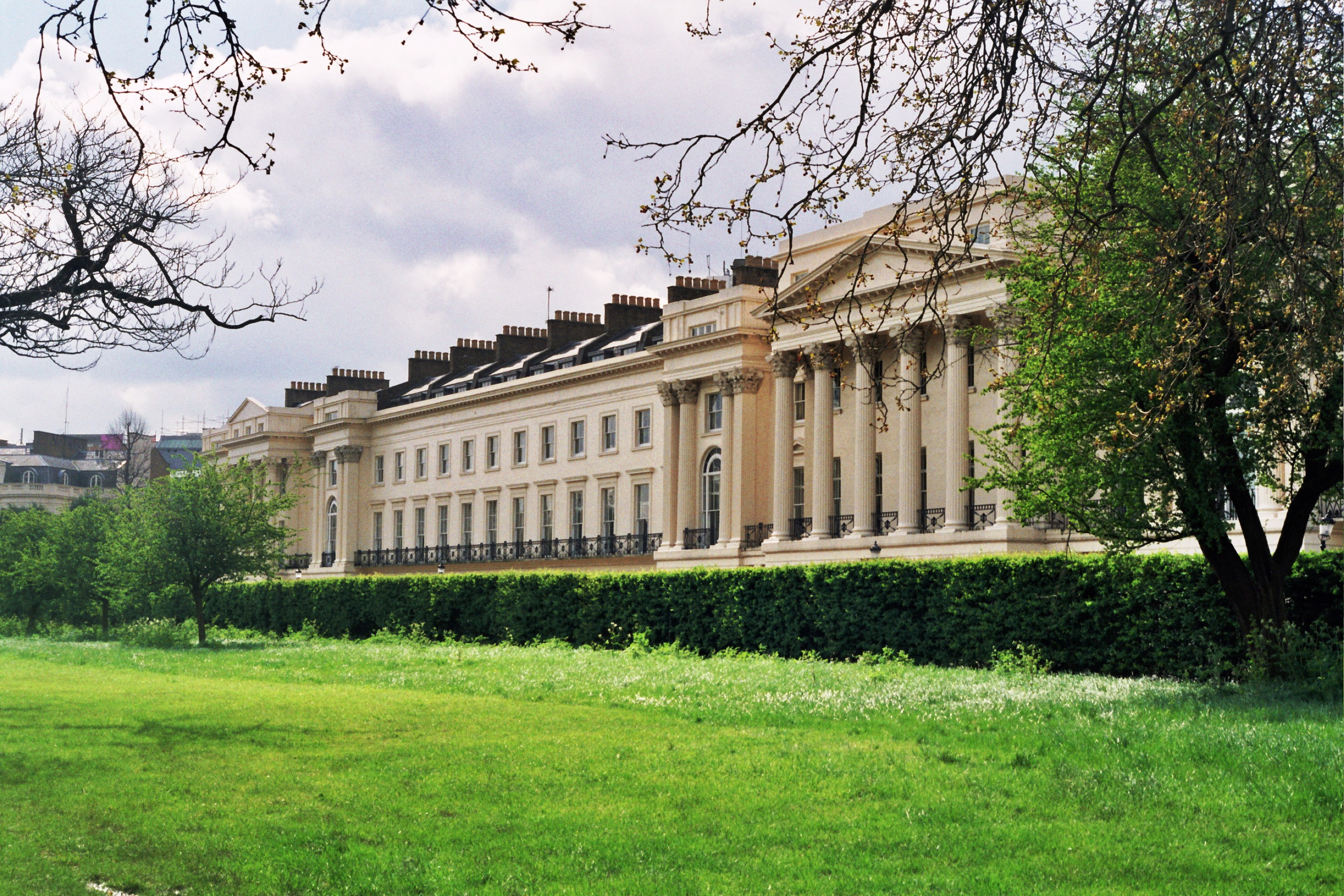
- 1–21 Cornwall Terrace in 2010

- Location within City of Westminster

General information
- Type: Historic building with several mansions
- Architectural style: Greco-Roman
- Location: Cornwall Terrace Mews, City of Westminster, London NW1, UK, London Borough of Westminster, Greater London, England
- Coordinates: 51°31′27″N 0°9′27″W
- Groundbreaking: 1821
- Completed: 1823
- Renovated: 1980

Cornwall Terrace (also 1–21 Cornwall Terrace) is a Grade I listed building of consecutive terraced mansions overlooking Regent's Park in the City of Westminster, Greater London. It is situated at the park's southwest corner, near Baker Street, between York Terrace and Clarence Terrace, within the park's Crown Estate development. Cornwall Terrace was part of the scheme of the Prince Regent, later King George IV, to develop grand housing in Regent's Park. The buildings are Grade I listed buildings.

== History ==
Cornwall Terrace was one of the earliest buildings constructed in Regency Park, and the park's first completed terrace. The terrace was constructed, between 1821 and 1823, by the property developer James Burton, to a Greco-Roman design by Decimus Burton and Sir John Nash. After the Second World War, the terrace was refurbished. It became a Grade I listed building on 9 January 1970.

In January 1975, hippie groups moved in and squatted the entire terrace. The Divine Light Mission opened up a health food store. Later in 1975, after the squatters were evicted, the terrace became the headquarters of British Land, a large property development company.

In the 2000s, much of the terrace was refurbished by Oakmayne Developers, who turned 18 of the houses into 8 luxury residences. The refurbishment of eight mansions was overseen by English Heritage and the Crown Estate. Each home was given the name of a notable person connected to the terrace.

== Architecture ==
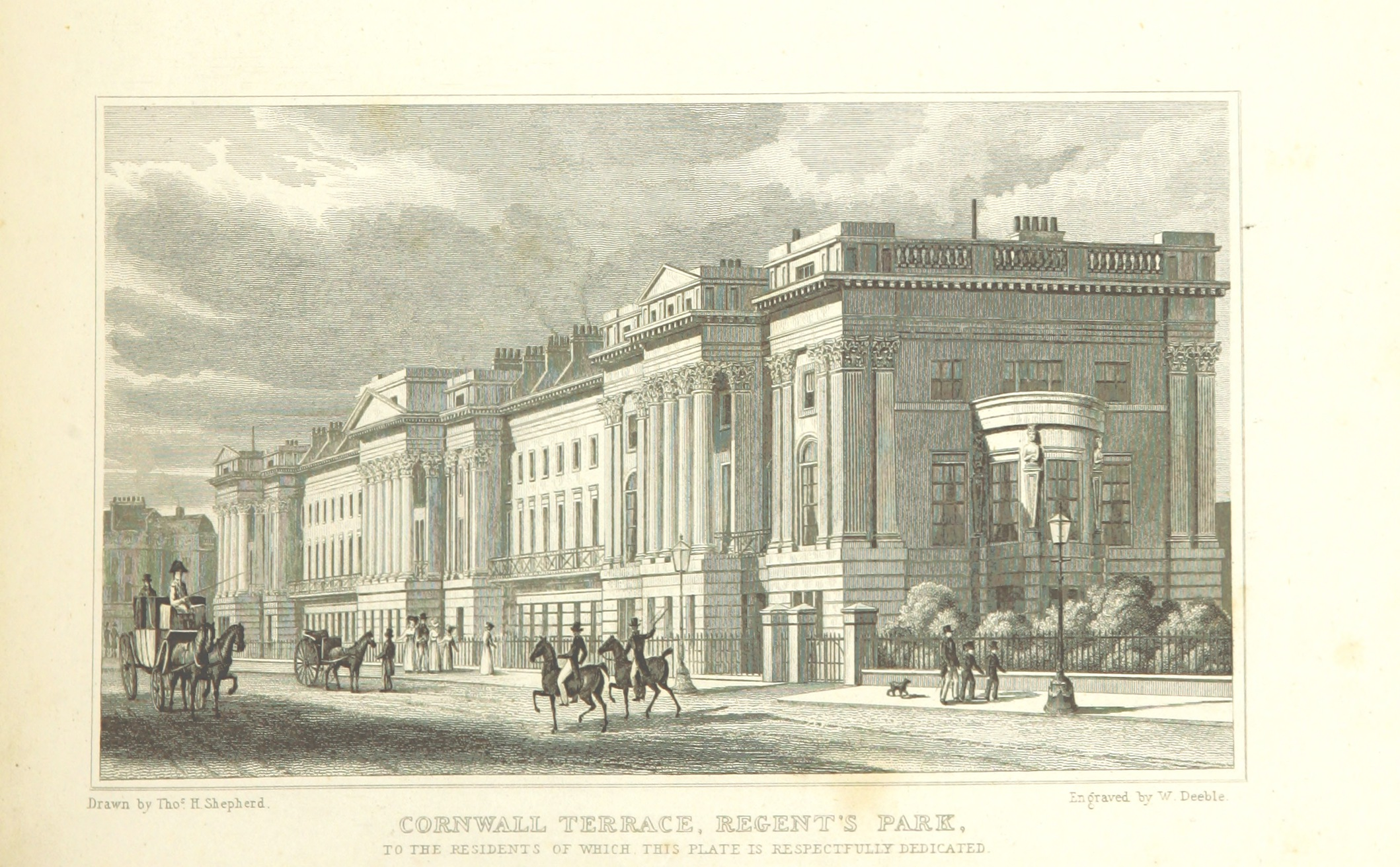
Cornwall Terrace in 1828

Architectural features give the building a regal appearance. The ground storey is rusticated, while the principal storeys are of the Corinthian order. The terrace block originally consisted of 19 houses, with Nos. 20 and 21 constructed later from the south pavilion. The original design contained three main storeys, an attic storey, pavilions, mansards, and basements, as well as shallow porches, square headed doorways, shallow architraves, first floor cornices, balustraded parapets, wings with Venetian-style windows, cast iron balconies, and spearhead area railings. There are fluted shafts, well proportioned capitals, and an entablature, No. 1 was adorned with a caryatid-bow.

== No. 1 ==
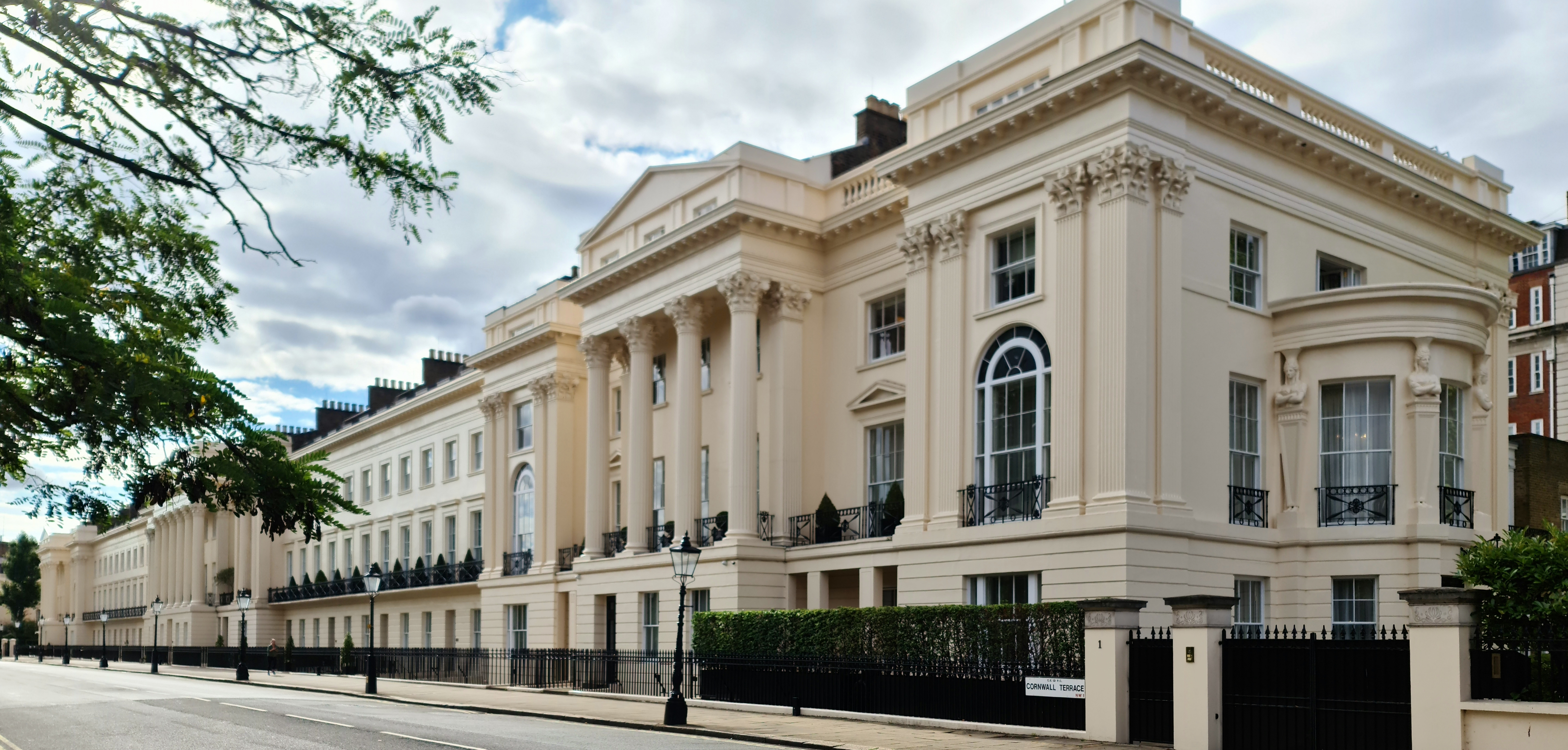
Cornwall Terrace in 2022; number 1 is on the right

No. 1 Cornwall Terrace is 21,500 square feet (2,000 m^{2}) in size. It has seven bedrooms, nine bathrooms, a hydraulic elevator, and 11 reception rooms; it is described as a "Trophy Home". The interior consists of hardwood floors and doors, Italian marble, period fireplaces, cornices.

No. 1 was the home of the New Zealand High Commissioner from 1955 until the mid-1970s; Sir Clifton Webb was the first New Zealand High Commissioner to live here.

By 2002, it belonged to telecommunications entrepreneur Charles Wigoder. Oakmayne Developers bought the mansion in 2007. When they refurbished it, two extra floors were added in the basement by digging 2 metres (6 ft 7 in) below the original basement.

Moza bint Nasser, the consort of a former Emir of Qatar bought numbers 1, 2 and 3 Cornwall Terrace in 2013 for an estimated £120 million. The following year, a planning application was made to merge the three properties into one 34,155 square foot home. The plan for a super-mansion with 17 bedrooms, 14 lounges, four dining rooms, a swimming pool, a cinema and a cigar lounge was recommended for refusal and withdrawn.

== No. 6 ==
No. 6 was put on sale in 2011 for £39 million. The refurbishment included marble floors, a £60,000 fireplace and a hydraulically operated lift.

== No. 9 – Siddons House ==
Pramod Agarwal bought No. 9 from Christian Candy for £37.5 million in October 2013 and was later forced to sell it. The residence is made from two townhouses knocked together in the 2000s. Since its refurbishment it is known as Siddons House after Mary Frances Scott-Siddons, who complained to the Prince Regent about the plans for Cornwall Terrace ruining her views of the park from Upper Baker Street.

== No. 11 – Silk House ==
Silk House (No. 11) was judged the Evening Standard's best new luxury home in 2011. It has a gym with spa, library, vault, five bedrooms, six reception rooms and staff quarters. It is named after former resident James Silk Buckingham.

== No. 13 ==
The Daiwa Anglo-Japanese Foundation has been based at Nos. 13–14 since 1993. It was formerly the home of Arthur Lasenby Liberty.

== No. 17 ==
The Royal College of Ophthalmologists was based at No. 17 from 1993 until 2014.

== No. 18/19 ==
Numbers 18 and 19 are owned by Vijay Mallya, who is subject to an extradition request by the Indian Government for various financial crimes. In 2018, he claimed that the property did not belong to him but his mother. Banks wanting to claim his assets found that the property was owned by a British Virgin Islands-based company called RCV, which is owned by Gladco Properties, which is owned by Continental Administration Service Ltd (CASL). CASL is a trustee of the Sileta Trust, which is a Mallya family trust. UBS Group AG pursued an order for possession in November 2018, seeking to evict Mallya, his son Sidhartha and his 95-year-old mother Lalitha Devi. The bank claimed that the five-year £20.4 million mortgage had not been repaid. The judge threw out Mallya's arguments and set a trial for May 2019.

Mallya then negotiated a settlement with UBS and the trial was vacated. According to the terms of the agreement, Mallya can remain in the property and if the mortgage is not repaid by April 2020, UBS have a right to immediate possession. Mallya must also pay the interest of £820,333 accrued up to April 2019 plus any further amount accrued up to 1 May 2020. He was also instructed to pay legal costs of £1,047,081 and receivers' costs of £223,863. Mallya is still appealing his extradition to India.

== No.20 – Lethbridge House ==
Lethbridge House (No.20) is a six bedroom house with swimming pool, gym, steam room, cinema and ballroom. It was put on sale in 2012 for £48 million. It is named after former resident Roper Lethbridge.
