= Clarence Terrace =

Building in Westminster, England

Coordinates: 51°31′30″N 0°09′34″W

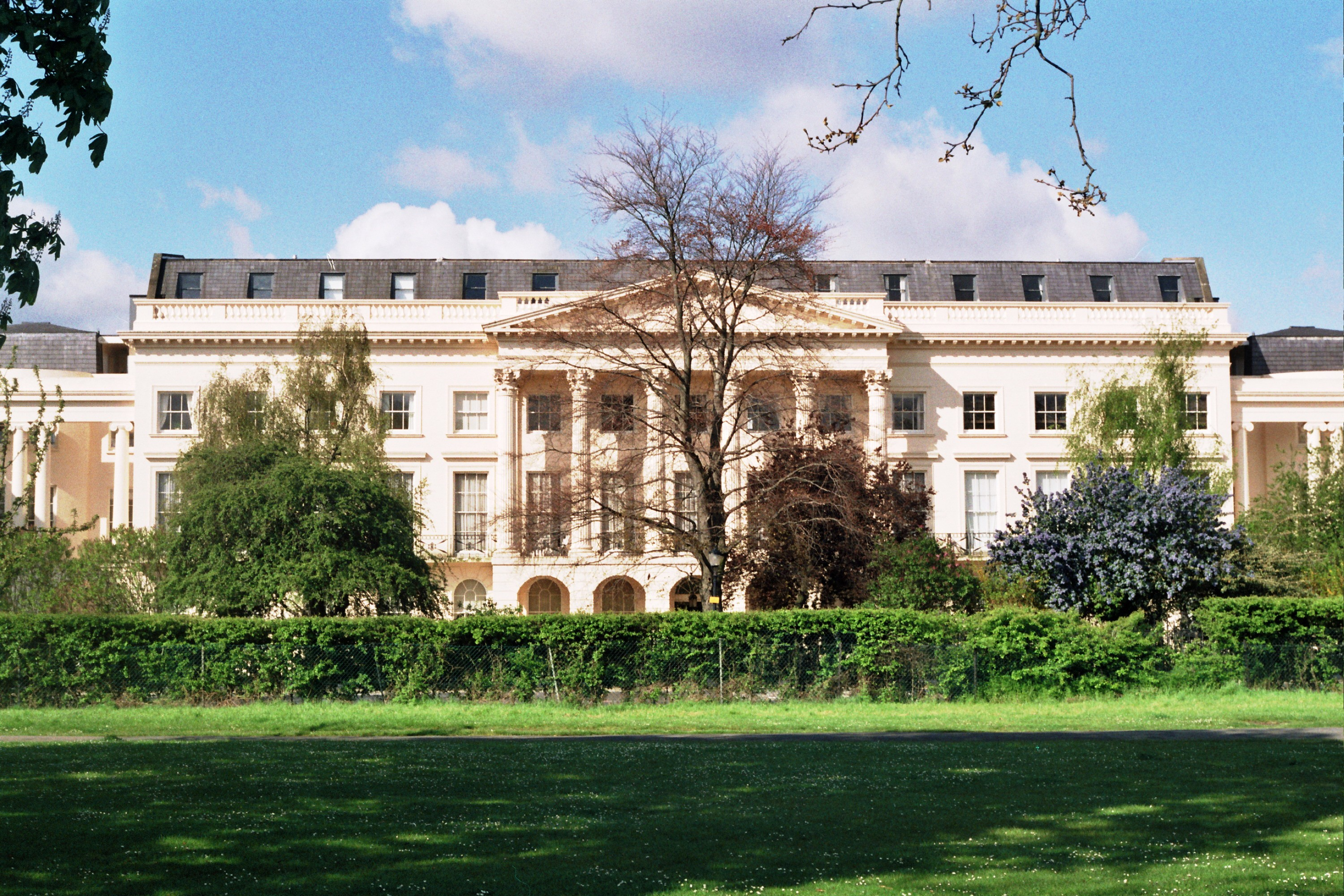
Clarence Terrace, Westminster

Clarence Terrace overlooks Regent's Park in Marylebone, City of Westminster, England. This terrace is the smallest in the park. The terrace is a Grade I listed building.

== Architecture ==
This row of terraced houses is named after William IV. It was constructed, by James Burton, to a design by Decimus Burton. It is composed of three sections, a centre and two wings, of the Corinthian order, connected by two colonnades of the Ilyssus Ionic order. The elevation is divided into three stories; namely, a rusticated entrance, which serves as a basement to the others, a Corinthian order embellishing the drawing room and chamber stories. There is also a well proportioned entablature.
