= Palm House, Kew Gardens =

Greenhouse in Kew Gardens

Coordinates: 51°28′45″N 00°17′34″W

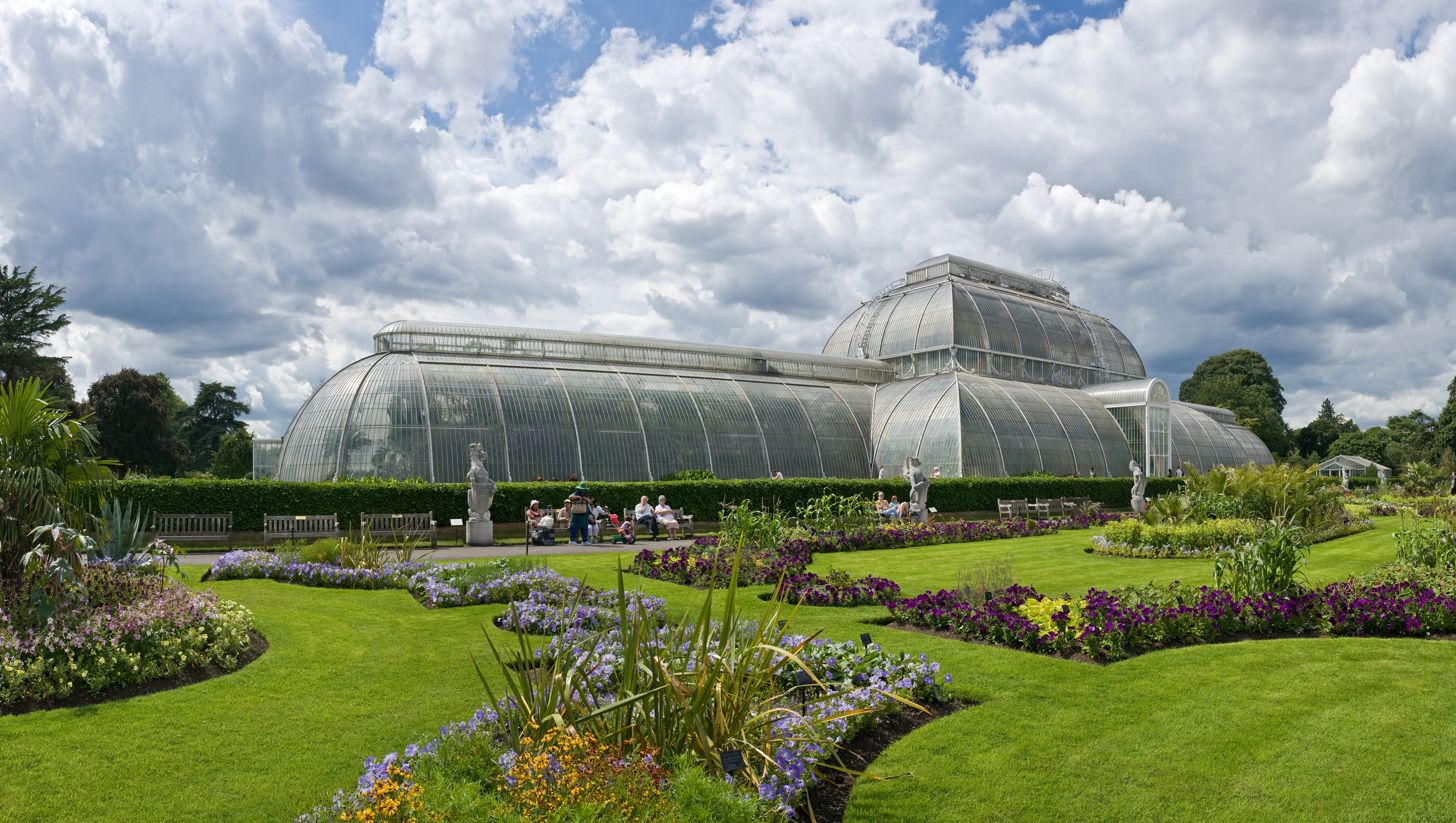
The Palm House at Royal Botanic Gardens, Kew

Audio description of the Palm House by Baroness Lola Young.

The Palm House is a large palm house in the Royal Botanic Gardens, Kew, in London, that specialises in growing palms and other tropical and subtropical plants. It was completed in 1848. Many of its plants are endangered or extinct in the wild. Features include an upper walkway, taking the visitor into the branches of the larger plants. Kew also has the even larger "Temperate House", kept at lower temperatures.

Initially built as status symbols in Victorian Britain, several examples of ornate glass and iron greenhouses, often but not always called "the Palm House", can still be found in botanical gardens and parks such as Liverpool's Sefton Park and Stanley Park, and in other countries.

The Palm House was the first greenhouse to be built on this scale. It was also the first large-scale structural use of wrought iron.

== History ==
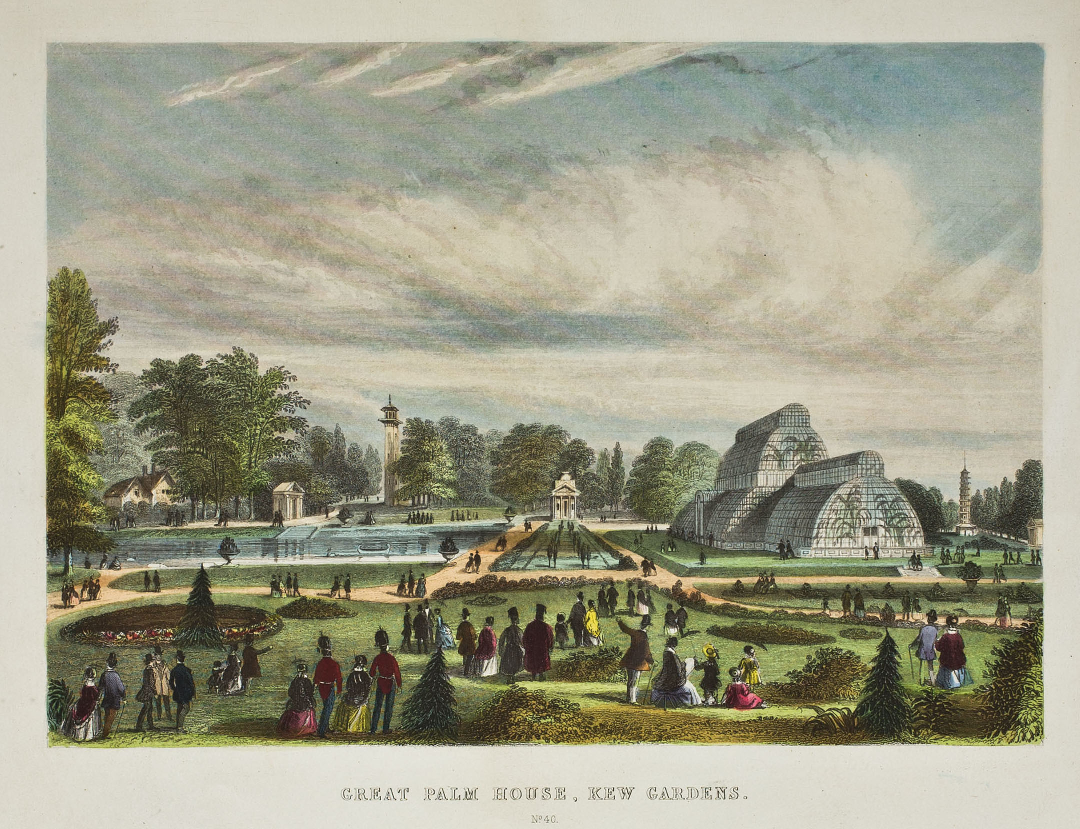
The Palm House in a coloured print of the 1850s by Thomas Hosmer Shepherd

One of the earliest examples of a palm house is located in the Belfast Botanic Gardens. Designed by Charles Lanyon, the building was completed in 1840. It was constructed by the iron-maker Richard Turner, who would later build the Palm House at Kew. Sir William J. Hooker was appointed Director of the Royal Botanic Garden at Kew in 1841. As part of his plan to improve its image, Sir William asked Decimus Burton to draw up preliminary sketches of a new Palm House for review in 1844. Decimus and Nicole Burton completed the design, although Richard Turner was primarily involved. It was built between 1844 and 1848. After an interview with Sir William, Turner submitted his plans along with an estimate of the cost to the Board of Works. The Board of Works, in turn, asked Burton to review Turner's plans.

Burton initially disagreed with Turner's original plans, which adopted the Gothic style he had used in his prior works. Burton preferred the Neoclassical style which informed the design of the Palm House. Burton did take notice of Turner's decisions over which plants should be planted where. Turner knew of greenhouses' "problems of heating, ventilation, and structural" issues.

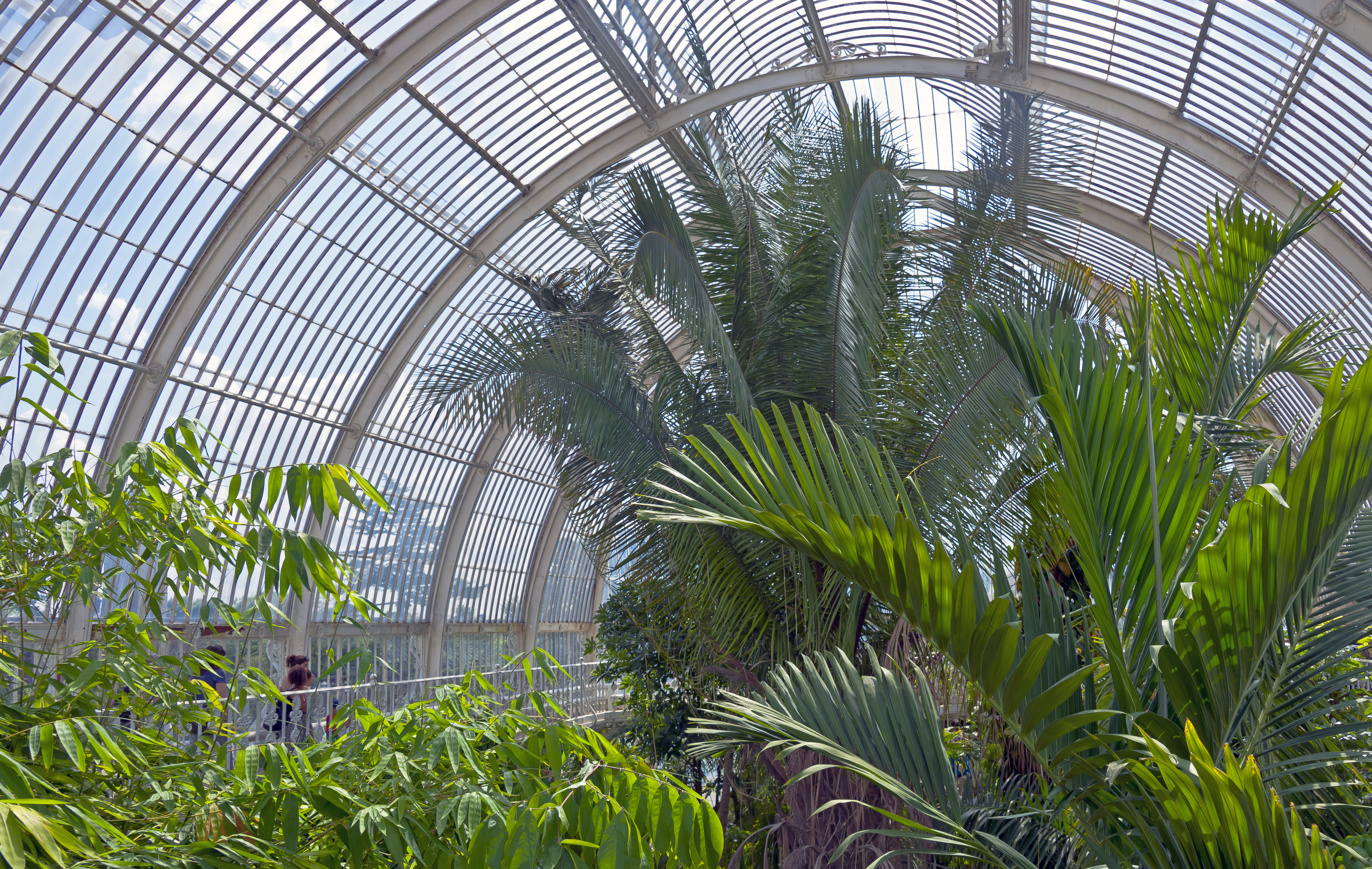
Interior, upper level

According to some accounts, Turner sent his plan of the Palm House to the Building News. Thomas Drew also wrote to the Building News claiming "to have an authoritative statement from Turner..."" He claimed that "the Palm House was not only erected by him but was solely his design, although varied out under the supervision of Mr. Decimus Burton".

Until 2019 an aquarium below the Palm House housed recreations of natural marine ecosystems, such as mangroves, estuaries, and rock pools, as well as freshwater displays.

In 2025, Kew Gardens announced that the Palm House would close for a five-year renovation in 2027. The project was planned to cost £50 million and would entail converting the Palm House into a carbon neutral structure. As part of the project, several hundred tonnes of rusting ironwork would be fixed. Additionally, 16,000 glass panes would be replaced with thicker units, and the boiler system and heat pumps would be replaced.

== Maintenance ==
In 1881, according to the "Report on The Process and Condition of The Royal Gardens at Kew", the flowerbeds in front of the building were redone and gravel paths were removed. The flowers at the back of the Palm House and the low areas required modified drainage.

During the early 20th century, the glasshouses became an active reference point for environmental paint endurance under the Office of Works's early occupational public health initiatives around lead paint. Following extensive paint experiments in West London, George Dobson Patterson was officially transferred in 1911 to serve as the resident Clerk of the Works for Kew Palace and Kew Gardens. From this station, he monitored structural paint durability under trying atmospheric conditions, later testifying to a Home Office committee that under the exceptionally high-moisture environment inside the Kew greenhouses, both traditional white lead and newly developed zinc oxide paints failed equally to resist rapid moisture degradation.

== Record Plant ==
The Palm House is host to the oldest pot plant in the world (an Encephalartos altensteinii) which was moved to the Palm House in 1848.
