= Reductoniscus costulatus =

Scientific classification
- Kingdom: Animalia
- Phylum: Arthropoda
- Class: Malacostraca
- Order: Isopoda
- Suborder: Oniscidea
- Family: Armadillidae
- Genus: Reductoniscus
- Species: R. costulatus

Binomial name
- Reductoniscus costulatus Kesselyák, 1930

Species of woodlouse

Reductoniscus costulatus is a species of woodlouse in the family Armadillidae. In the wild, R. costulatus has been found in Mauritius, the Seychelles and Hawaii, including the islands of Oʻahu and Kauaʻi and Hawaiʻi. It was discovered in the Palm House at the Royal Botanic Gardens, Kew in 1948, 1976 and 1988, and has been found in greenhouses across Europe.

== See also ==
- List of woodlice of the British Isles
