= Palm house =

Type of greenhouse

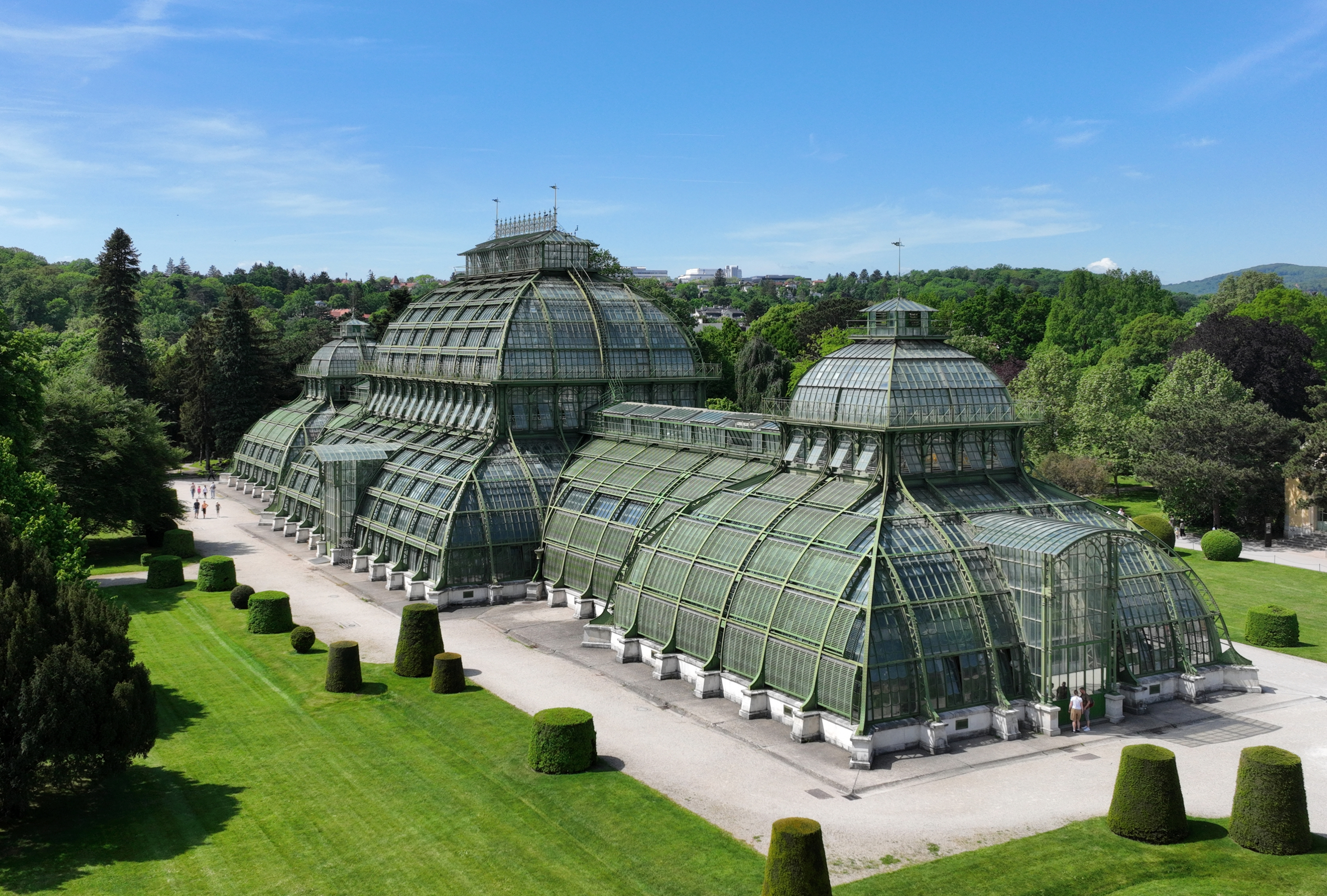
The Palmenhaus Schönbrunn in Vienna, 1882, 111 metres long, 28 metres wide and 25 metres high

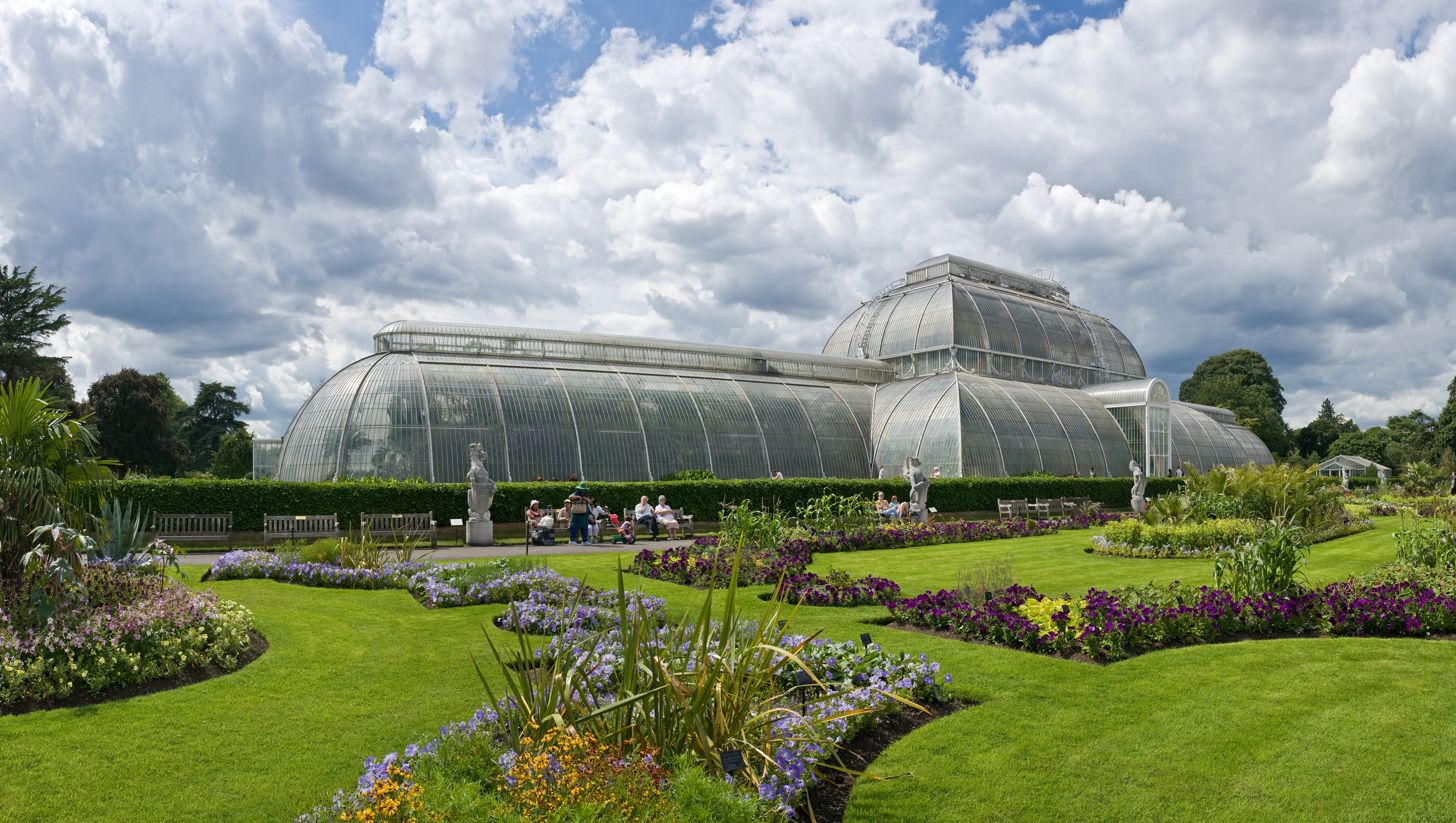
The Palm House, Kew Gardens, 1848, 62 feet high and 362 long

Palm house is a term sometimes used for large and high heated display greenhouses that specialise in growing palms and other tropical and subtropical plants. In Victorian Britain, several ornate glass and iron palm houses were built in botanical gardens and parks, using cast iron architecture. Especially in English-speaking countries outside the British Isles, these are often called conservatories, in the UK mainly a term for small glass structures attached to houses.

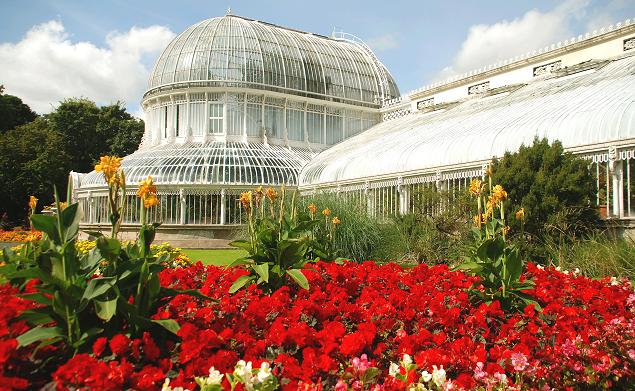
The Palm House at the Belfast Botanic Gardens, 1840

The large example, completed in 1848, in Kew Gardens, London was arguably the first greenhouse to be built on this scale. It was also the first large-scale structural use of wrought iron. The later Temperate House at Kew is in fact even larger. Other British examples are at Liverpool's Sefton Park and Stanley Park. Elsewhere there are the Franklin Park Conservatory in Columbus, Ohio, the Royal Greenhouses of Laeken in Brussels, the Palmenhaus Schönbrunn in Vienna, and many others.

The rounded shapes characteristic of Kew were replicated during the 19th century. Due to the fact that certain ironworking technqiues were adopted from shipbuilding, the resemblance of many designs to upturned hulls is not entirely coincidental. In the 20th century some pyramidal designs and geodesic domes were adopted. The "Tropical Pyramid" at the Muttart Conservatory in Alberta (c. 1976) and Eden Project in England are respectively examples of these shapes. The term "palm house" tends not to be used, though the function of the buildings remains the same.

== History ==
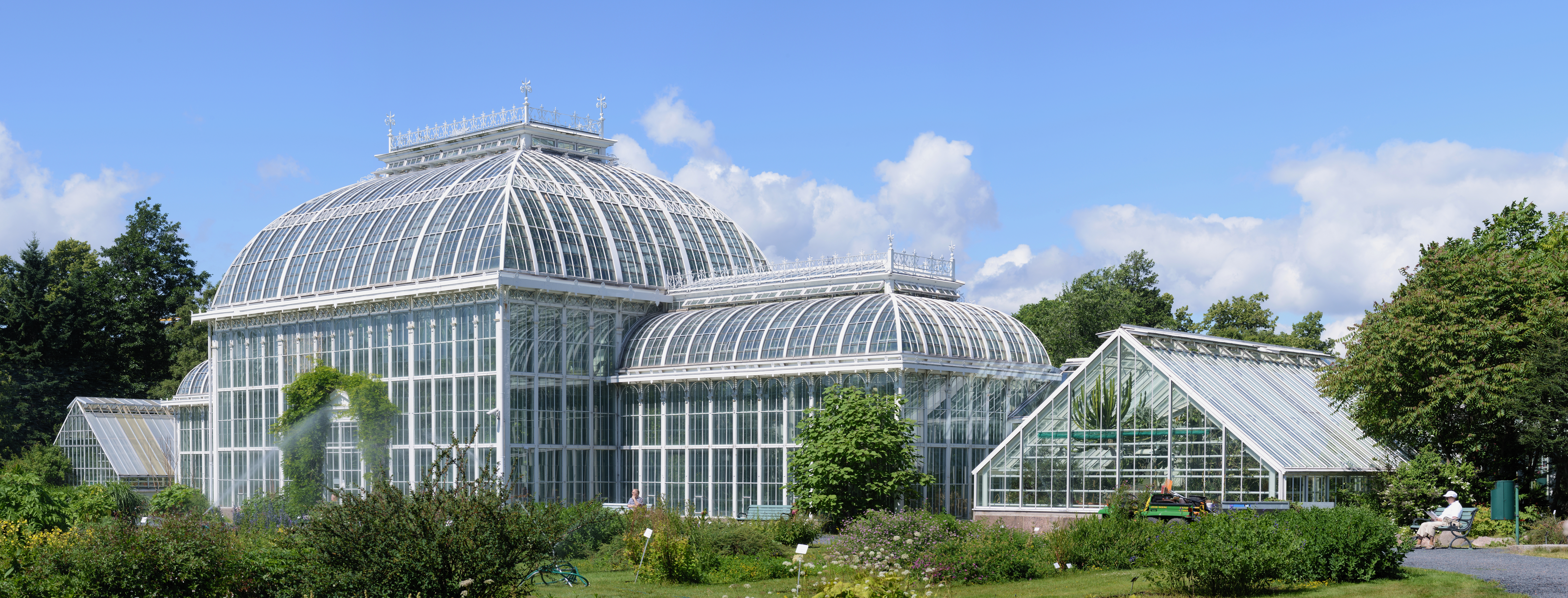
Helsinki Botanic Garden, 1889

The palm house was a stage in the 19th-century development of glass and iron architecture, which was also widely used in railway stations, markets, exhibition halls, and other large buildings needing a large and open internal area. The Anthaeum, Hove was a very ambitious example, with a huge cupola-topped dome covering more than 1.5 acres (0.61 ha). It was planned by Henry Phillips as a visitor attraction by itself, with Amon Henry Wilds as the architect; both were local men from Brighton and Hove. However, it collapsed the day before its official opening in 1830.

One of the earliest examples of a palm house is located in the Belfast Botanic Gardens. Designed by Charles Lanyon, the building was completed in 1840. It was constructed by iron-founder Richard Turner, who would later build the Palm House at Kew in 1848, to a design by Decimus Burton; this is 62 feet high and 362 long. This came shortly after the Chatsworth Great Conservatory (1837–40; 67 feet high and 277 long, demolished in 1920) and shortly before The Crystal Palace (1851), both designed by Joseph Paxton, and both now lost.

== Faunal biodiversity ==
Palm houses can be seen as a special human-made ecosystems, or anthromes, which serve as islands of habitat in temperate climates for otherwise-tropical species of terrestrial and aquatic invertebrates (such as spiders and rotifers) who were brought there unintentionally on plant material. Scientists have used palm houses and their unusual populations of exotic invertebrates to study otherwise-remote species, and some unknown-to-science species have been collected in palm houses. In some cases, these species may not be able to survive outside of the palm house, but for a particularly adaptable species, a palm house might help cause a species invasion.
