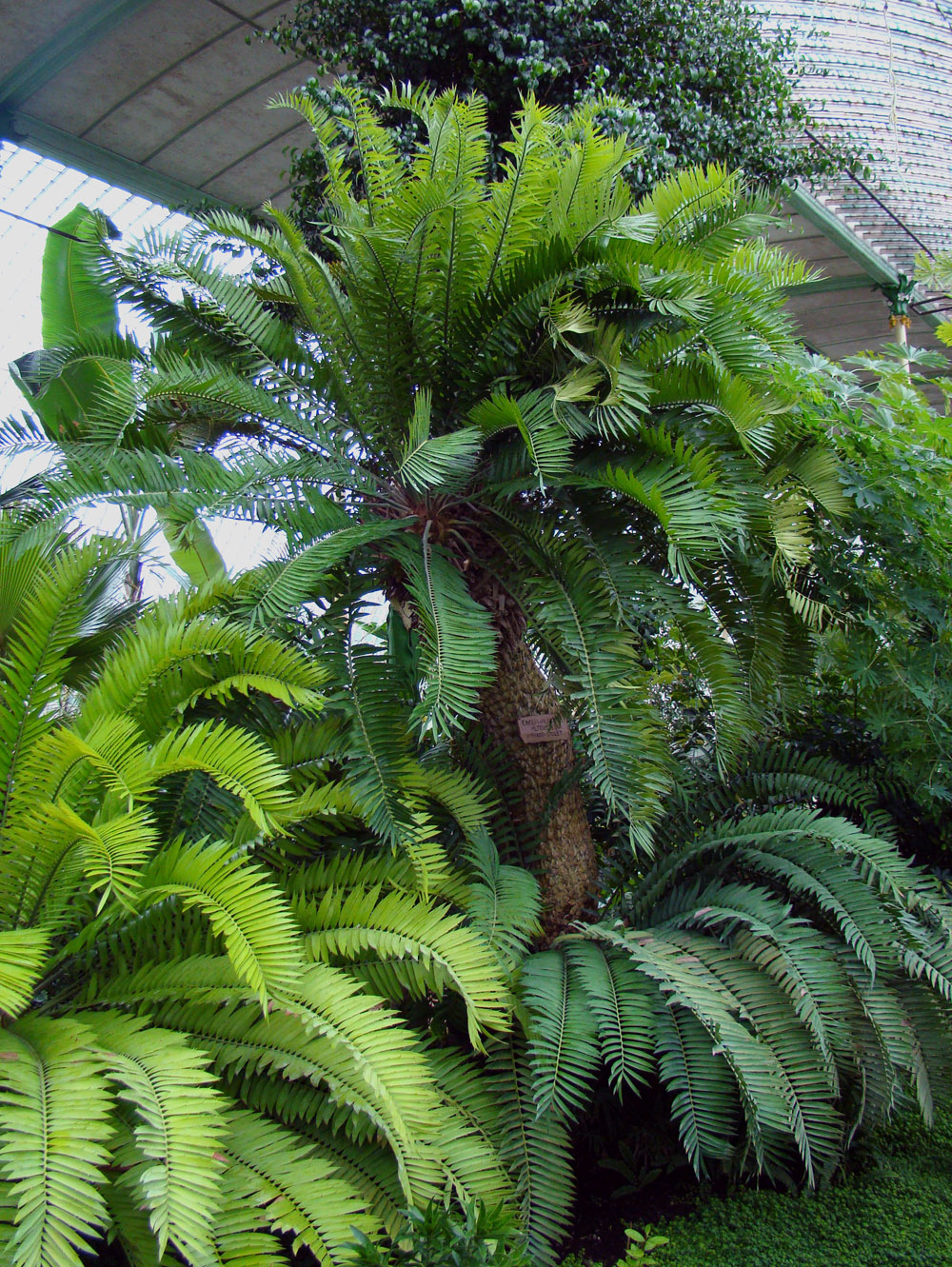
- The oldest European cycad in Lednice Greenhouse, Czech Republic. This plant predates the 1845 glasshouse and is estimated to be 300–500 years old.

Conservation status
- Vulnerable (IUCN 3.1)
- CITES Appendix I (CITES)

Scientific classification
- Kingdom: Plantae
- Clade: Tracheophytes
- Clade: Gymnospermae
- Division: Cycadophyta
- Class: Cycadopsida
- Order: Cycadales
- Family: Zamiaceae
- Genus: Encephalartos
- Species: E. altensteinii

Binomial name
- Encephalartos altensteinii Lehm.

Synonyms
- List: Zamia altensteinii (Lehm.) Heynh.; Bombax encephalartos J.Schust.; Encephalartos altensteinii var. angustifolius Miq.; Encephalartos altensteinii var. distans Regel; Encephalartos altensteinii var. eriocephalus de Vriese; Encephalartos altensteinii var. grandis Regel; Encephalartos altensteinii var. macrophyllus Regel; Encephalartos altensteinii var. parvifolius Regel; Encephalartos altensteinii var. semidentatus Miq.; Encephalartos altensteinii var. spinosior Regel; Encephalartos marumii de Vriese; Encephalartos regalis W.Bull; Encephalartos vroomii Mast.; Zamia glabra J.Schust.; Zamia katzeri Regel ex J.Schust.; Zamia spinosa Lodd. ex Miq.; Zamia vernicosa T.Moore & Mast.; Zamia vroomanii L.Gentil

= Encephalartos altensteinii =

Species of cycad

Encephalartos altensteinii is a species of palm-like cycad in the family Zamiaceae. It is endemic to South Africa. The species name altensteinii commemorates Altenstein, a 19th-century German chancellor and patron of science. It is commonly known as the breadtree, broodboom, Eastern Cape giant cycad or uJobane (Zulu). It is listed as vulnerable due to habitat destruction, use for traditional medicine and removal by collectors.

== Description ==
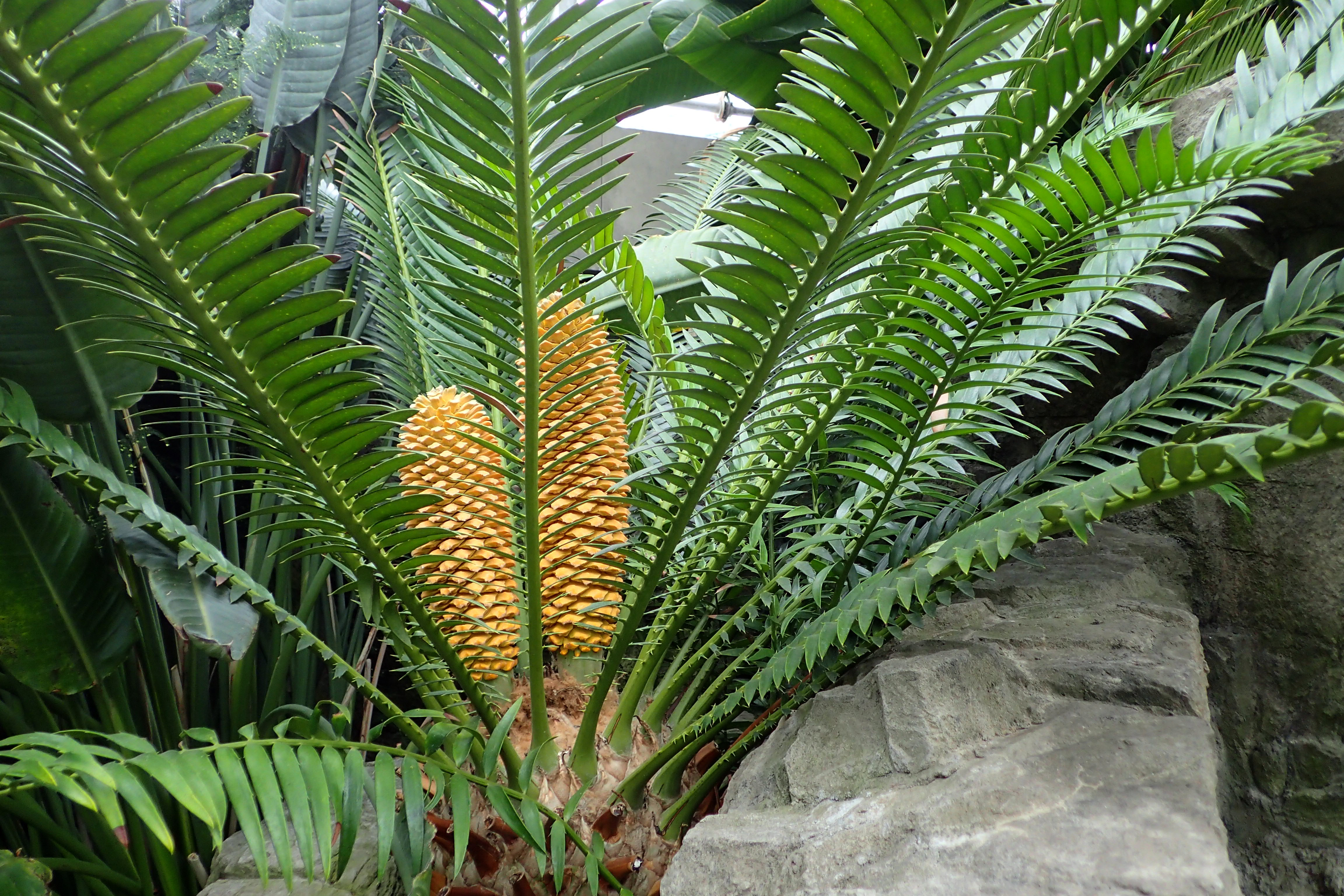
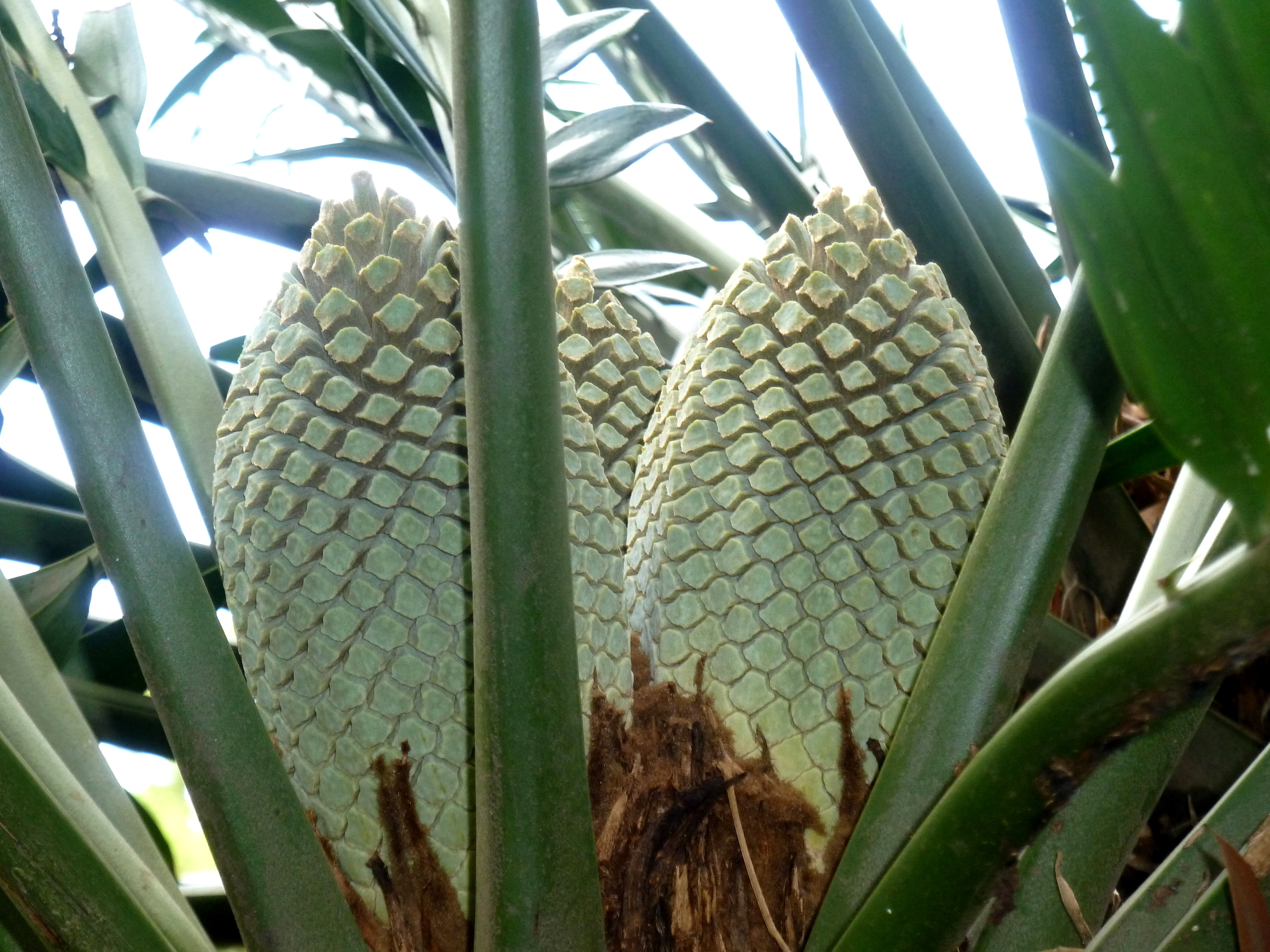
Male cones (above) and female cones (below)

This cycad grows up to seven metres (23 ft) tall and may be branched or unbranched. The leaves are straight or curved backwards and up to three metres (9.8 ft) in length. The leaflets are rigid and fairly broad with one or both margins toothed. There are no prickles at the base of the leaf which distinguishes it from E. natalensis. There are usually two to five greenish-yellow cones up to 50 centimetres (20 in) long, the female scales covered with protuberances. The cones are poisonous to humans. The seeds are scarlet and up to four centimetres (1.6 in) long.

== Distribution and habitat ==
This species is widespread in the Eastern Cape and south-western KwaZulu-Natal provinces of South Africa. It favours sites near the coast including open scrub, steep rocky slopes, evergreen forests in valleys and river banks. It also occurs inland at a higher altitude in isolated sites in the Amatola Mountains.

The individual growing in the Palm House at Royal Botanic Gardens, Kew, UK is considered to be the oldest potted plant in the world, having arrived there in 1775. Other individuals have also reached a great age, with the one in Lednice Greenhouse, Czech Republic estimated to be 300 to 600 years old.
