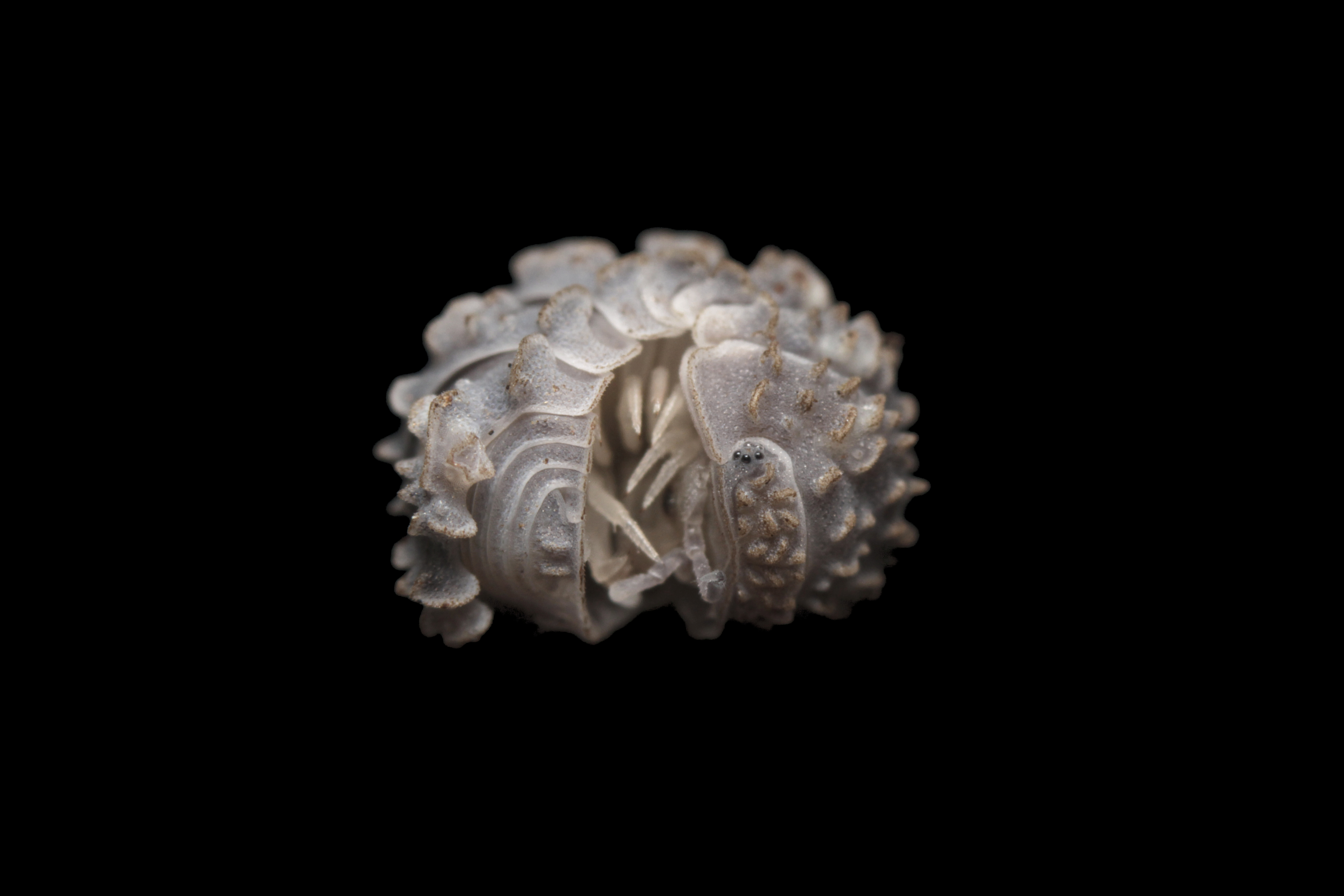
- Reductoniscus tuberculatus

Scientific classification
- Kingdom: Animalia
- Phylum: Arthropoda
- Class: Malacostraca
- Order: Isopoda
- Suborder: Oniscidea
- Family: Armadillidae
- Genus: Reductoniscus; Kesselyák, 1930

= Reductoniscus =

Genus of woodlice

Reductoniscus is a genus of woodlice belonging to the family Armadillidae. This genus was described in 1930 by Adorján Kesselyák. The type specimen for this species is a Reductoniscus costulatus that was found in the greenhouses of Berlin Botanical Garden and Botanical Museum. There are currently four species in this genus.

== Description ==
This genus has very reduced uropods.

== Distribution ==
This genus has been found in the wild in Hawaii, Malaysia, Mauritius, New Guinea, Seychelles, and Saint Helena. It is also found in greenhouses in mainland Europe.

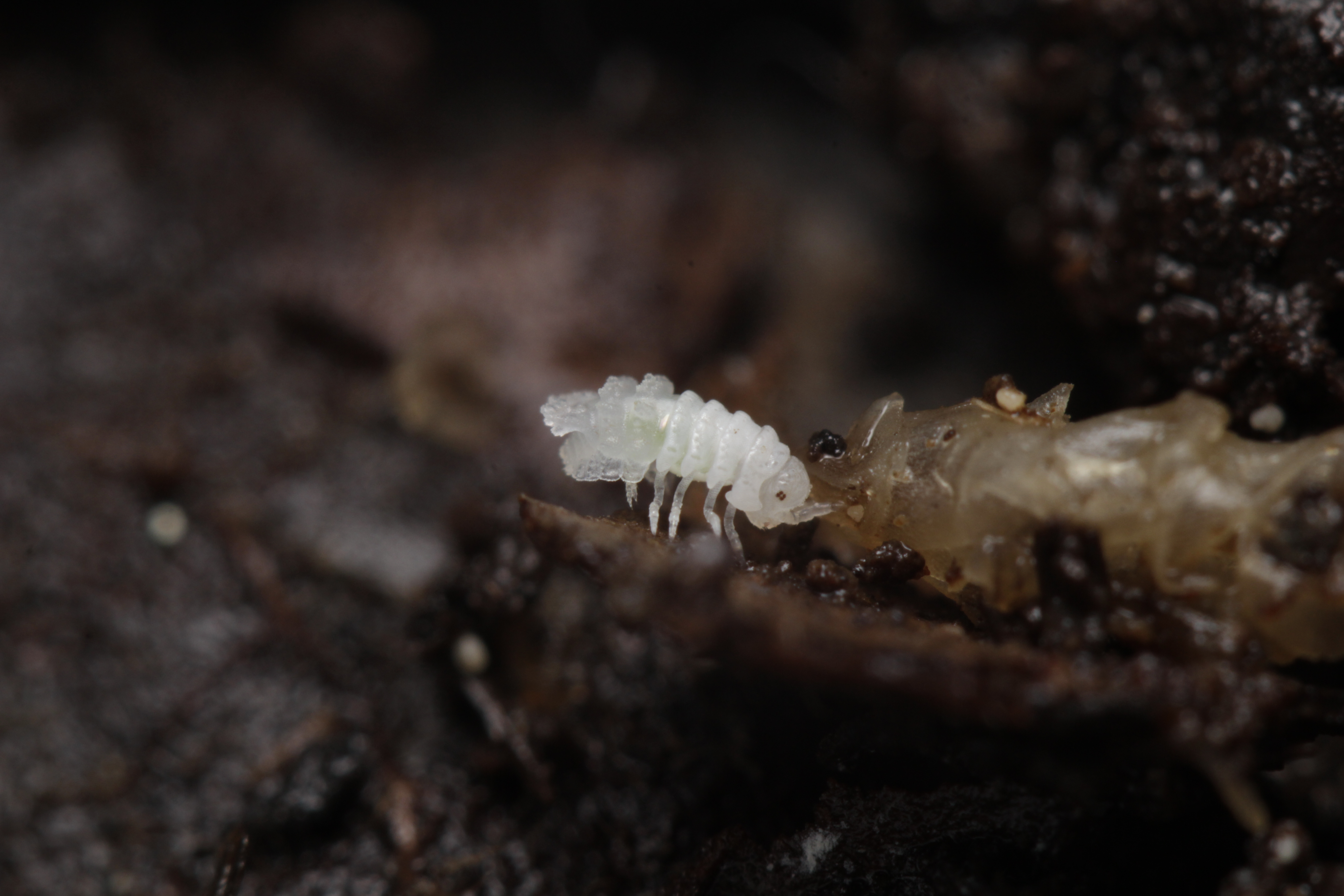
Reductoniscus tuberculatus, manca, after molting posterior half (first molt) Date 25 September 2023

== Species ==
- Reductoniscus costulatus Kesselyák, 1930
- Reductoniscus novaehiberniae Ferrara & Taiti, 1990
- Reductoniscus pulcher Ferrara & Taiti, 1990
- Reductoniscus tuberculatus Leistikow, 1997

=== Former species ===
- Reductoniscus gibbus Lemos de Castro, 1972 = Pseudodiploexochus gibbus
- Reductoniscus insularis Vandel, 1977 = Pseudodiploexochus insularis
- Reductoniscus leleupi Vandel, 1977 = Pseudodiploexochus leleupi
- Reductoniscus mellissi Vandel, 1977 = Pseudodiploexochus mellissi
- Reductoniscus wattii Vandel, 1977 = Pseudodiploexochus wattii
