= Botanic Gardens (Belfast) =

Public garden in Belfast, Northern Ireland

Botanic Gardens Belfast
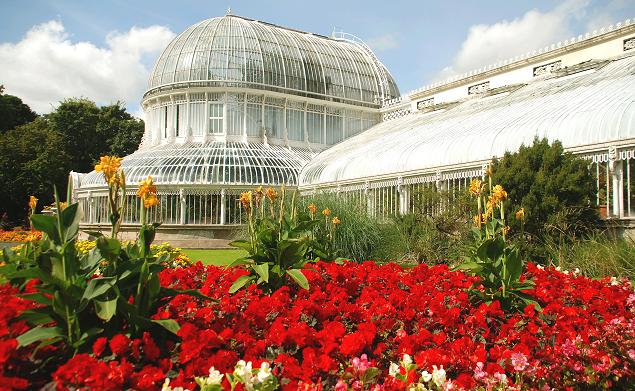
- Palm House and flower bed
- Interactive map of Botanic Gardens Belfast
- Type: Botanical
- Location: Belfast, County Antrim
- Coordinates: 54°34′50″N 5°55′50″W
- Area: 28 acres (110,000 m^{2})
- Opened: 1828
- Owner: Belfast City Council
- Status: Open All Year
- Collections: Lilies; Xanthorrhoea; Sunken Garden
- Public transit: Botanic railway station
- Website: Belfast City Council web page

Botanic Gardens is a public garden in Belfast, Northern Ireland.

Occupying 28 acres (110,000 m^{2}) of south Belfast, the gardens are popular with office workers, students and tourists. They are located on Stranmillis Road with Queen's University nearby. The Ulster Museum is located at the main entrance.

== History ==
The gardens opened in 1828 as the private Royal Belfast Botanical Gardens. It continued as a private park for many years, only opening to members of the public on Sundays prior to 1895. Then it became a public park in 1895 when the Belfast Corporation bought the gardens from the Belfast Botanical and Horticultural Society. The Belfast Corporation was the predecessor of Belfast City Council, the present owner.

== The Palm House ==
The gardens' most notable feature is the Palm House conservatory. The foundation stone was laid by the Marquess of Donegall in 1839 and work was completed in 1840 by leading ironmaster Richard Turner (iron-founder). The dome was added in 1852.

It is one of the earliest examples of a curvilinear cast iron glasshouses in the world. Belfast's Palm House predates the glasshouses at Kew and the Irish National Botanic Gardens at Glasnevin, both of which Turner went on to build. The Palm House consists of two wings, the cool wing and the tropical wing.

Lanyon altered his original plans to increase the height of the latter wing's dome, allowing for much taller plants. In the past these have included an 11-metre-tall (36 ft) globe spear lily. The lily, which is native to Australia, finally bloomed in March 2005 after a 23-year wait. The Palm House also features a 400-year-old Xanthorrhoea.

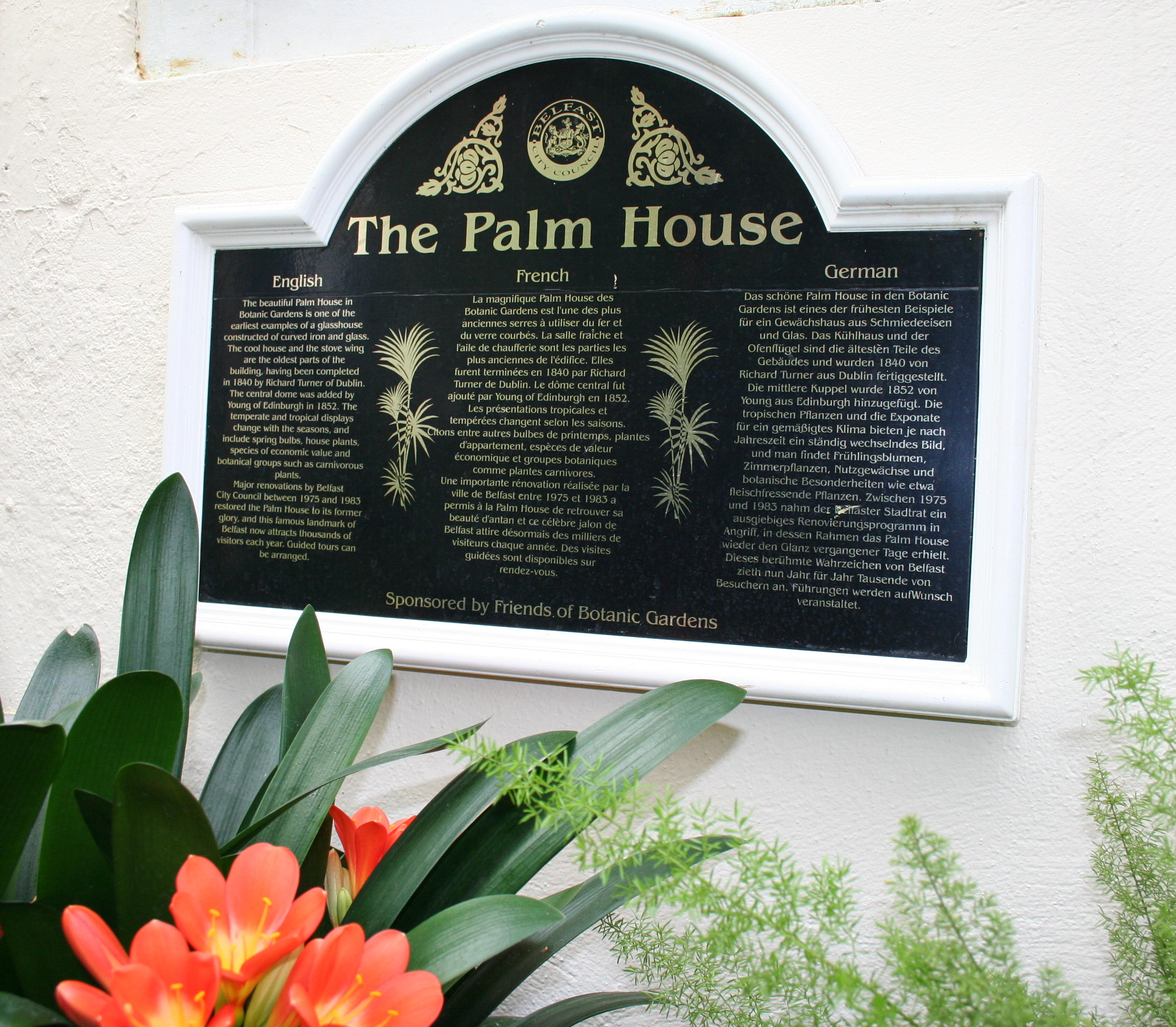
Plaque in three languages

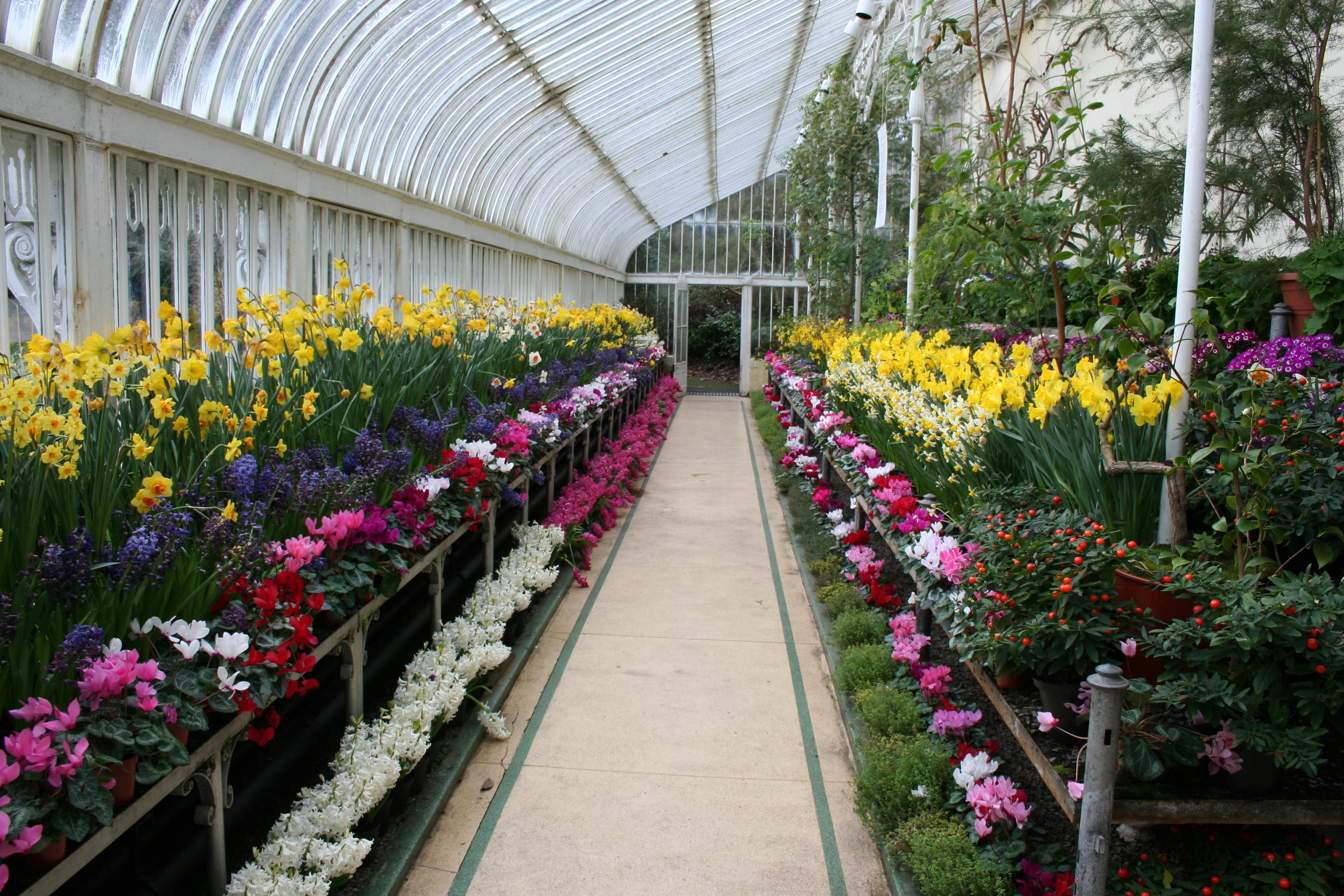
Early spring flowers

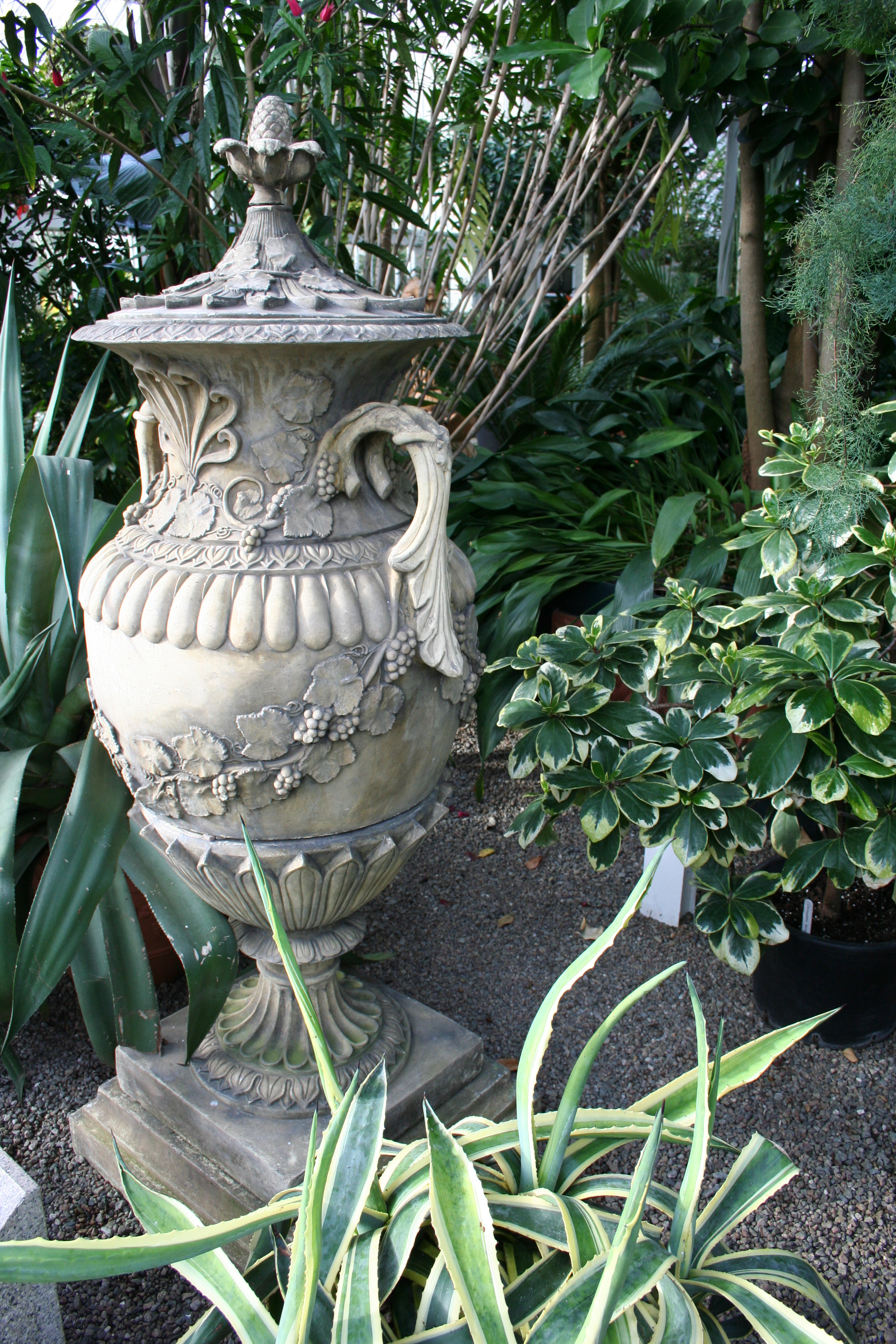
Urn

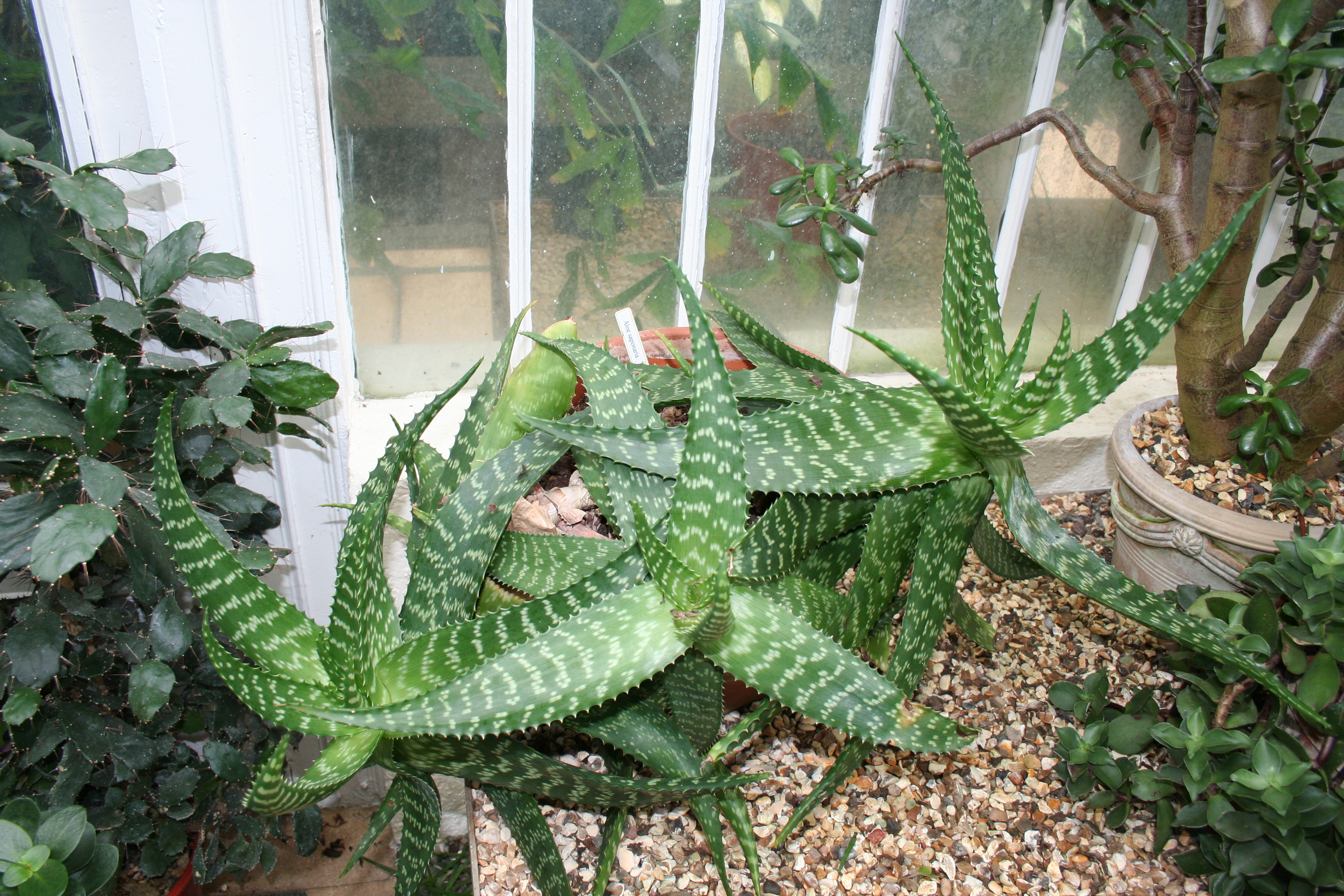
Aloe saponaria

== Other features ==
The gardens contain another glasshouse, the Tropical Ravine House. Built by head gardener Charles McKimm in 1889, it features a unique design. A sunken ravine runs the length of the building, with a balcony at each side for viewing. The most popular attraction is the Dombeya, which flowers every February.

The Palm House and the Tropical Ravine House were symbols of Belfast's growing industrial might and prosperity in the Victorian era and attracted over 10,000 visitors a day. The gardens also feature one of the longest herbaceous borders in the UK and Ireland. There is also a rose garden built in 1932 and various species of tree, including the hornbeam-oak. A statue of Lord Kelvin stands at the Stranmillis Road entrance.

== Global Medicine Garden ==
n 2019, Friends of Belfast Botanic Gardens developed a Global Medicine Garden on a next to the newly restored Tropical Ravine. The garden is managed for wildlife and so neither pesticides or herbicides are used, while compost and leaf mould are made on-site and larger supplies of compost are peat-free.

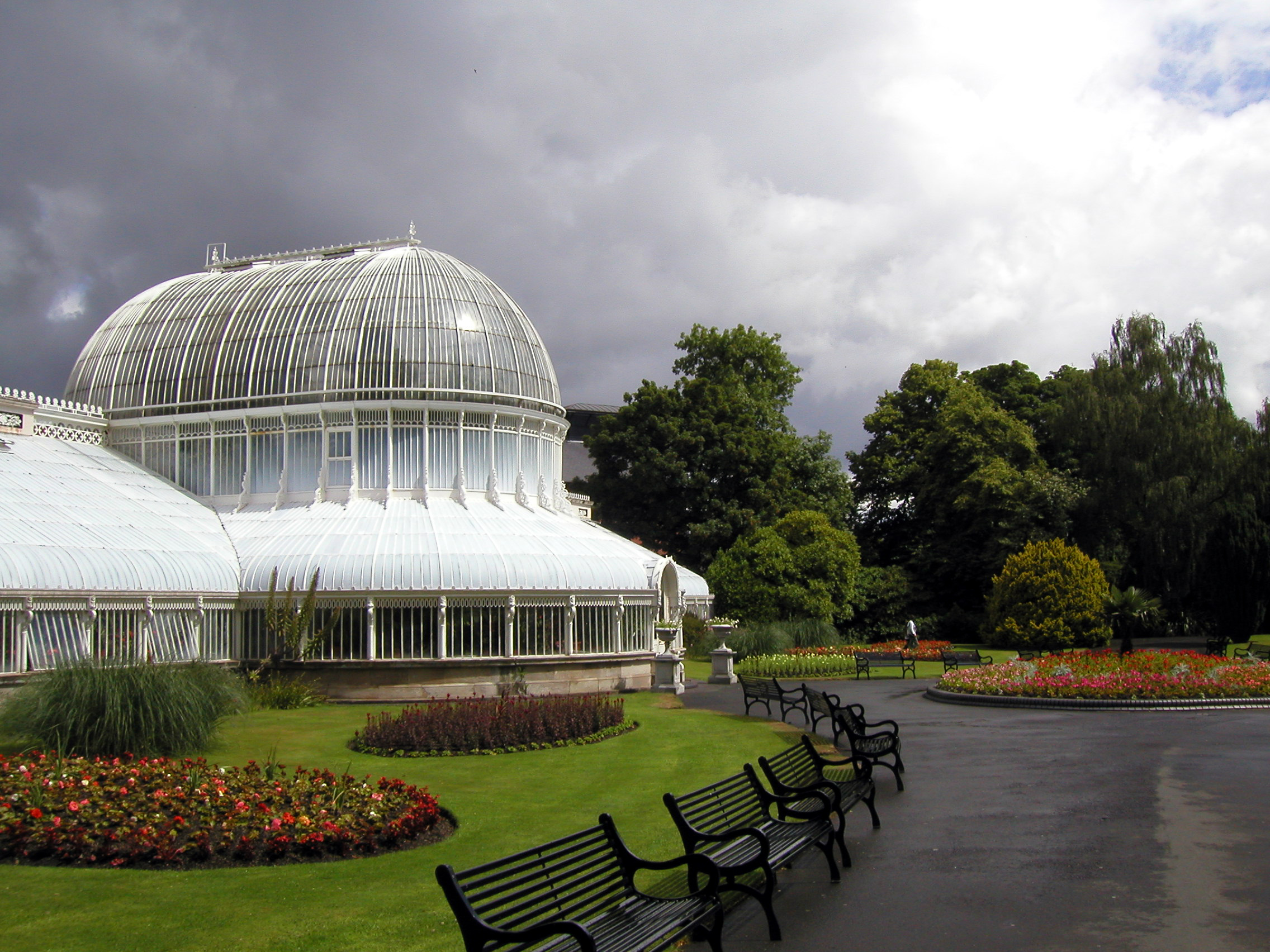
The Palm House

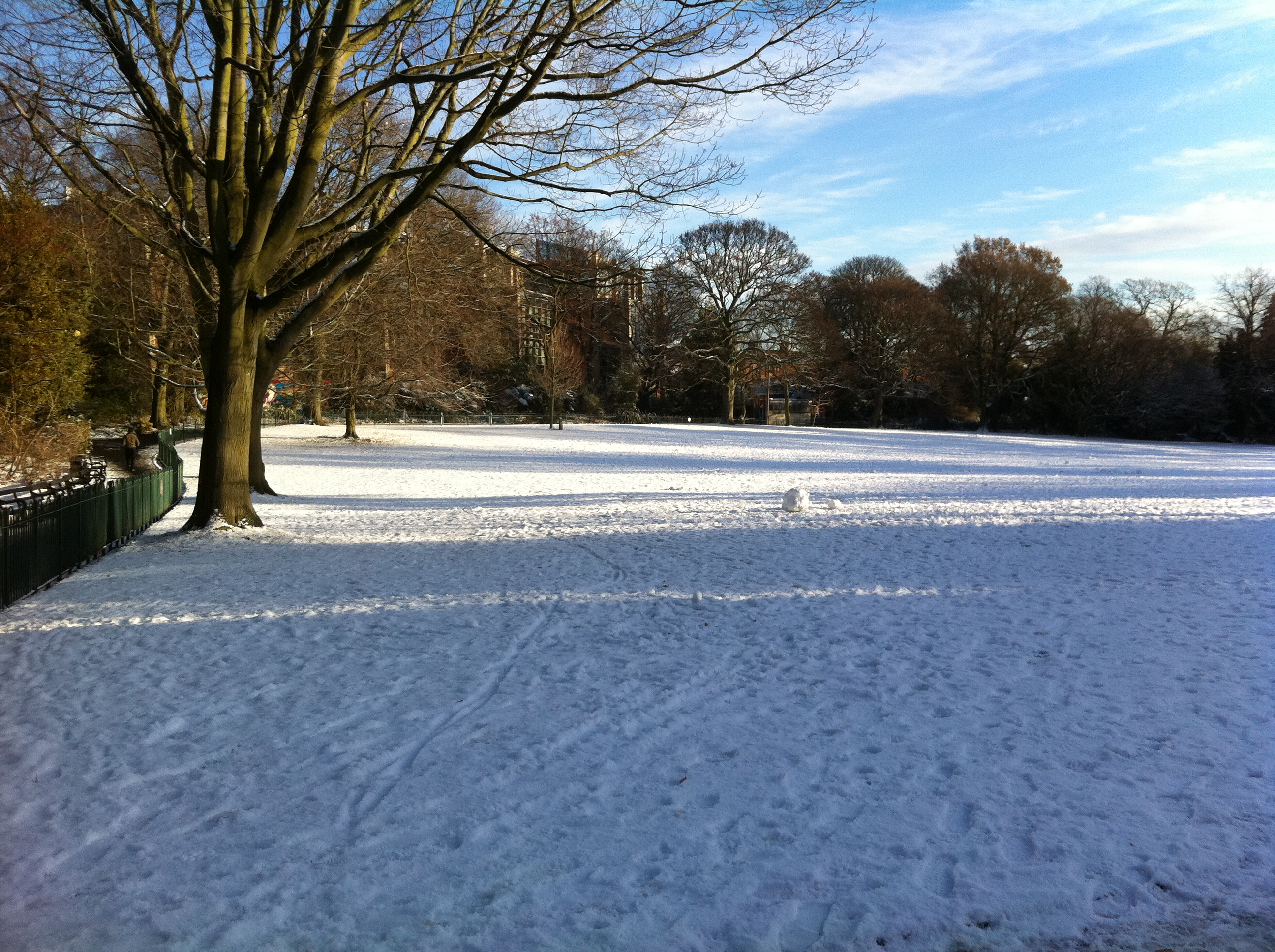
Botanic Green in winter

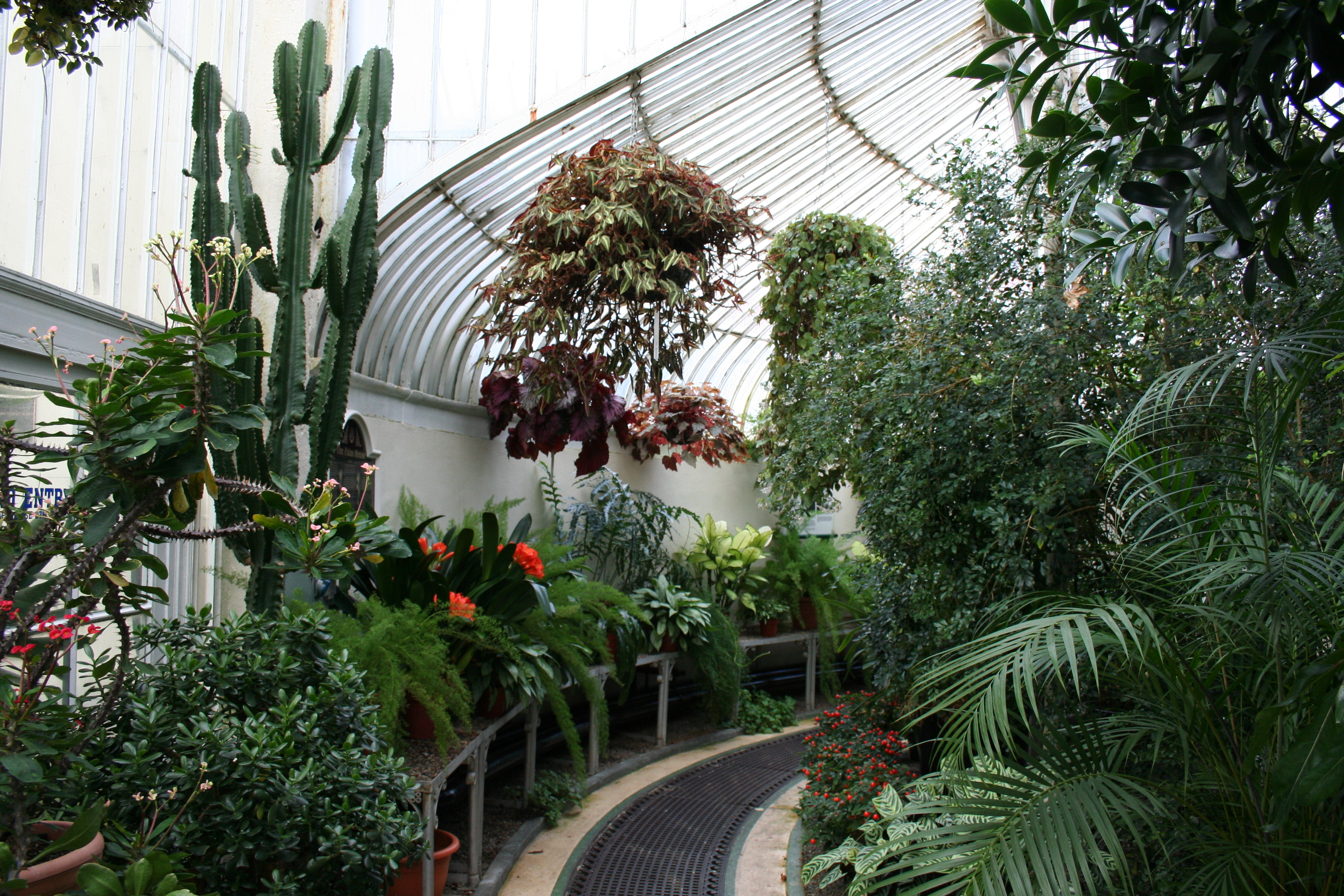
Inside the Palm House

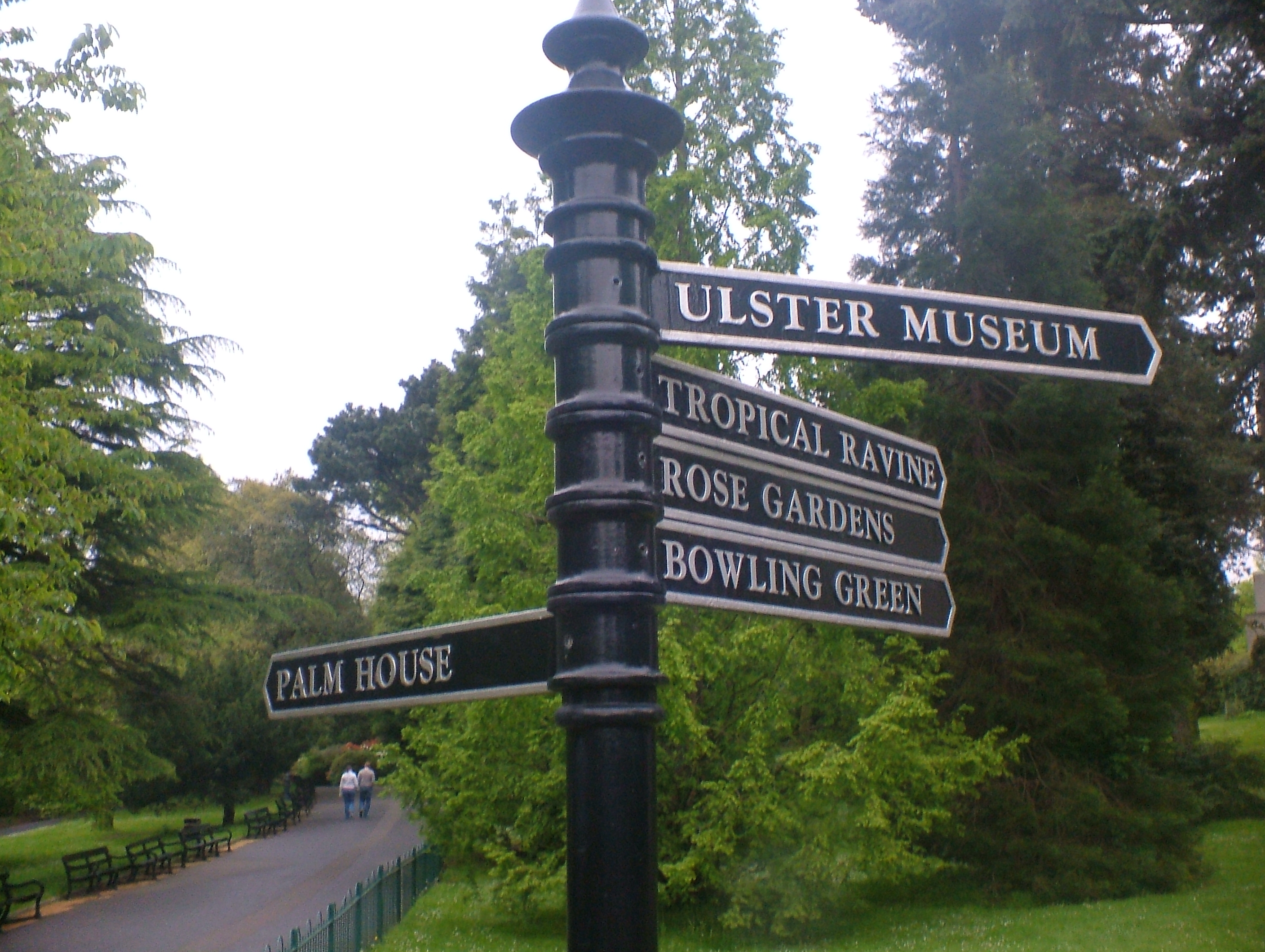
Botanic park sign post

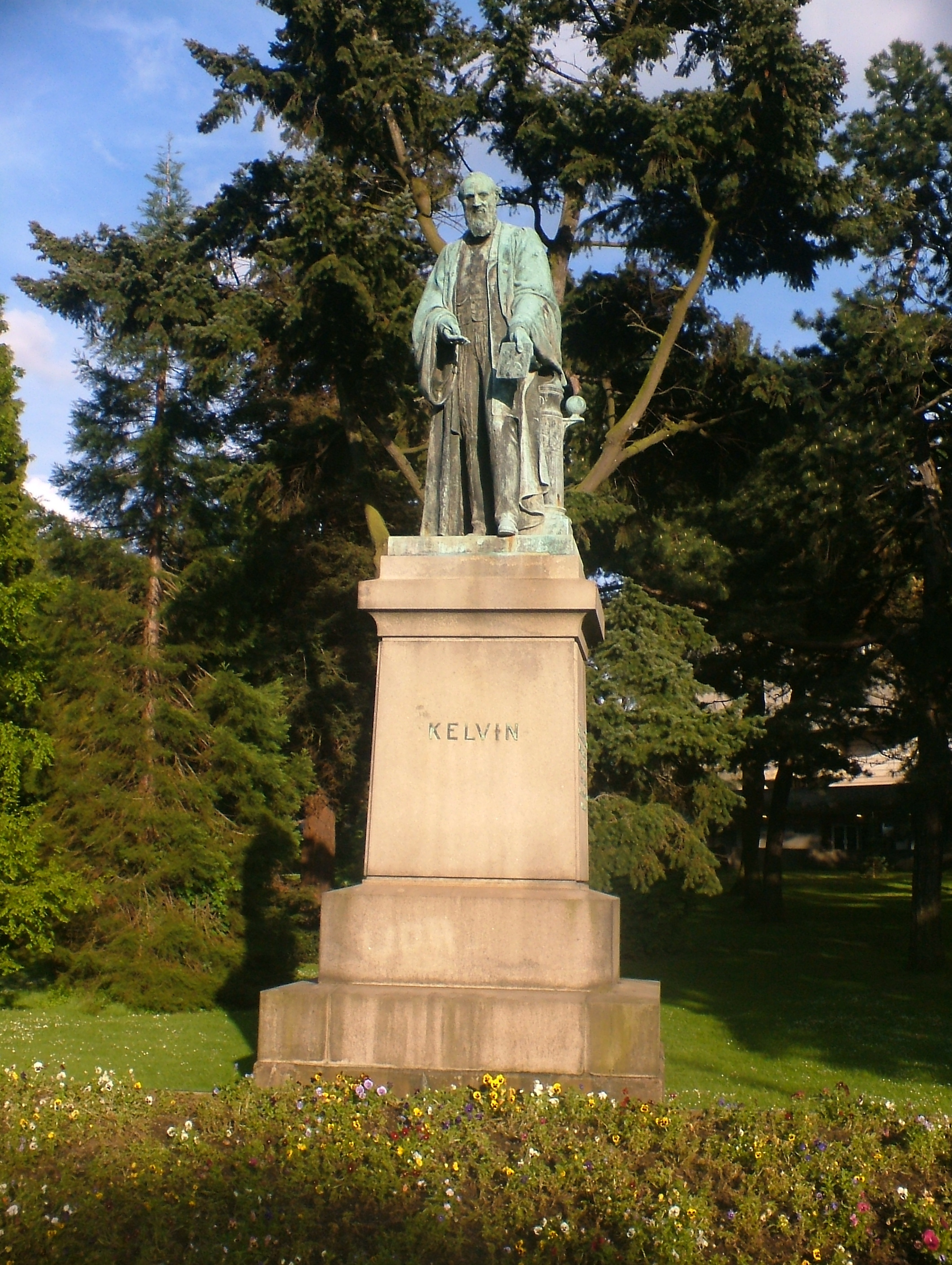
Belfast born physicist Lord Kelvin at the entrance to the Botanic gardens

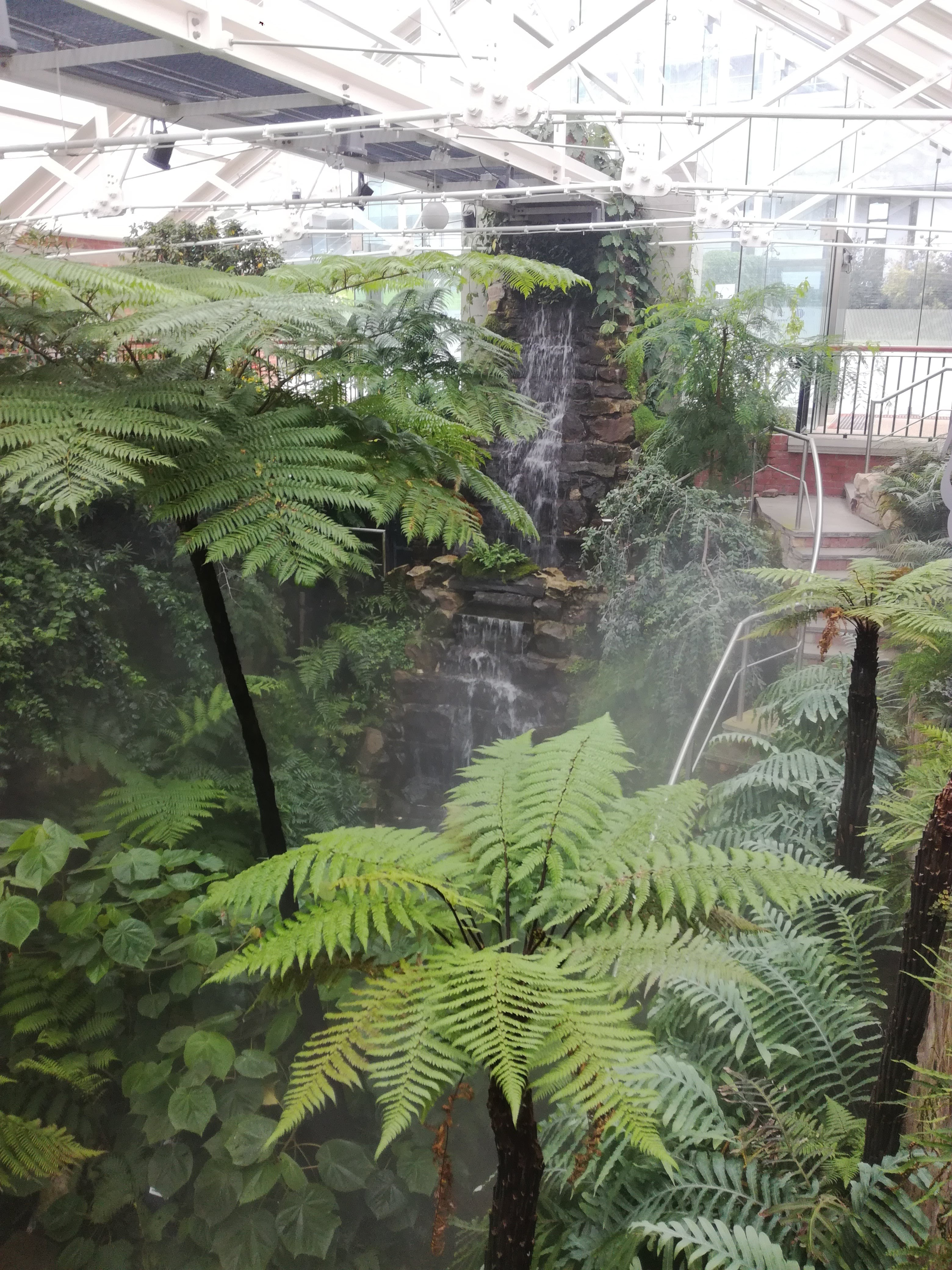
Tropical Ravine House in 2018, after refurbishment

== Concerts ==
Concerts and music festivals are held at the Stranmillis Embankment end of the gardens. From 2002 to 2006 the Tennents ViTal festival was held in the gardens. Performers included Kings of Leon, Franz Ferdinand, The Coral, The Streets and The White Stripes. In 2006 Snow Patrol, The Raconteurs, Editors and Kaiser Chiefs played at the festival.

On 26 August 1997 U2 played their first Belfast concert in over a decade as part of the PopMart Tour. 40,000 fans attended, with thousands more lining the perimeter fence and watching from rooftops on Ridgeway Street. Local band Ash and Howie B were the support acts.

Celine Dion was due to perform in the Botanic Gardens on 29 May 1999 during her Let's Talk About Love World Tour, however the show was cancelled along with her performance in Dublin on 27 May 1999.

== Popular Culture ==
- The consumption of alcohol is banned within the park, however groups of young people drinking are common during the summer months. The opening scene of Colin Bateman's novel Divorcing Jack finds the protagonist Dan Starkey with a crate of Harp Lager in the gardens.
- The park figures prominently in The Fall, as the favorite destination of young Olivia "Livvy" Spector, whose serial killer father, (Peter) Paul Spector, and babysitter Katie both take her there, on different occasions. CCTV captures Spector's presence there on the same Saturday as one of his victims, Sarah Kay, whose sister tells the police the siblings met there weekly. Indeed, by eavesdropping on the sisters' conversation at the park that day (in series 1), Spector learns Sarah Kay has not changed her back door locks, which knowledge he uses to his advantage. And in series 2, when Katie takes Livvy out of school without the Spectors' knowledge or permission, Paul finds them there, on a hunch.

== Botanic Station ==
Frequent trains operated by Northern Ireland Railways run to Botanic railway station.

== See also ==
- List of tourist attractions in Ireland
