= Richard Turner (iron-founder) =

Irish iron founder

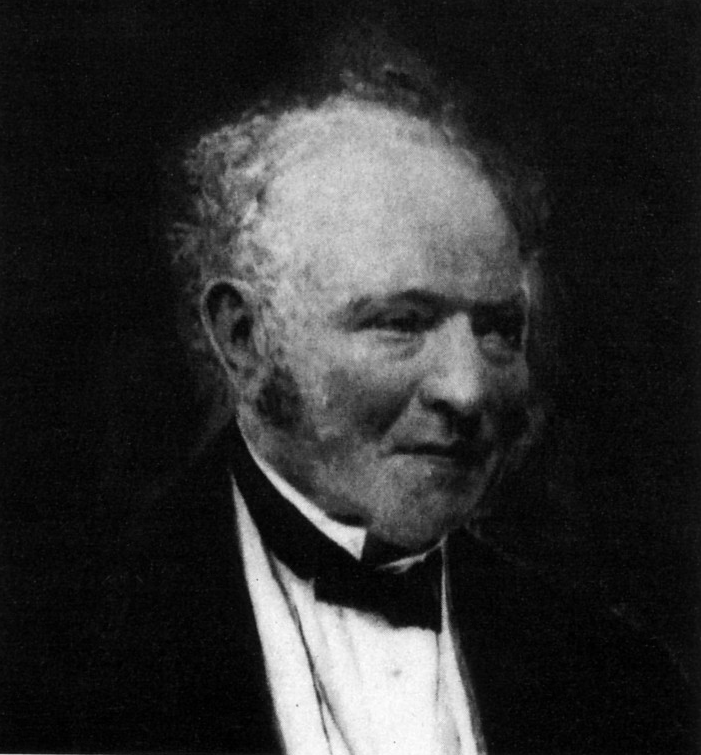
- Born: 1798; Dublin, Ireland
- Died: 31 October 1881 (aged 82/83); 78 Rathmines Road, Dublin
- Resting place: Mount Jerome Cemetery and Crematorium
- Occupations: Ironmaster and engineer

Richard Turner (1798–1881) was an Irish iron founder and manufacturer of glasshouses, born in Dublin. He is rated as one of the most important glasshouse designers of his time. His works included the Palm House at Kew Gardens (with Decimus Burton), the glasshouse in the Winter Gardens at Regent's Park in London, the Palm House at Belfast Botanic Gardens and the Curvilinear Range at the Irish National Botanic Gardens, Glasnevin, Ireland.

== Life ==
Turner was born in Dublin around 1798, the son of a merchant Timothy Turner and Catherine (née Sissons). Both his grandfather and great-grandfather were also ironsmiths, the elder of which worked on the provost's house at Trinity College, Dublin. Turner inherited the ironworks from his uncle, also named Richard Turner. Turner became a property speculator, building houses on Pembroke Road, Leeson Street and Rathmines Road in Dublin. All of the houses were known for their geometric fanlights. He married Jane Goodshaw in 1816, and the couple had at least 10 children.

== Iron foundry work ==
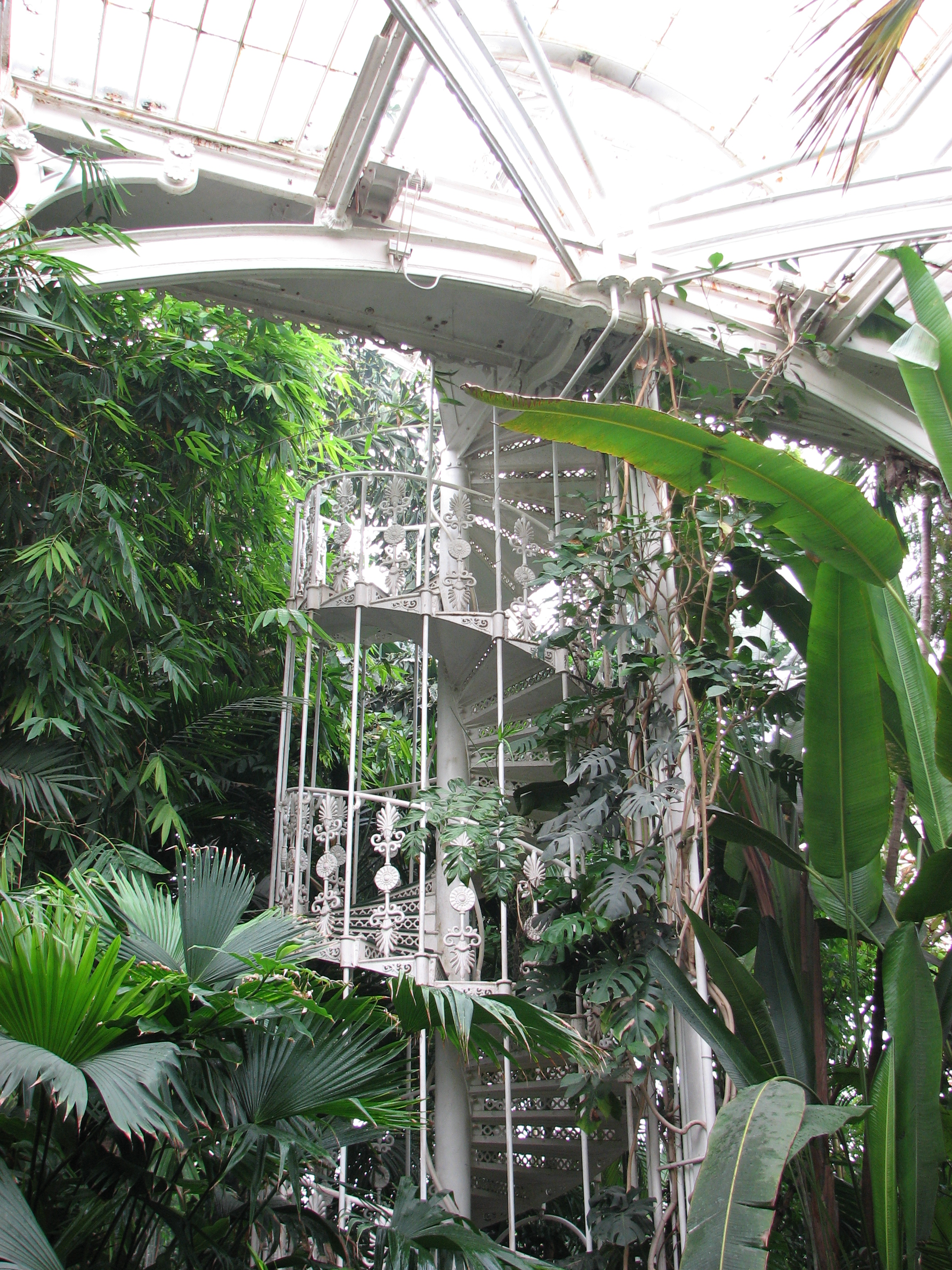
Temperate House, Kew Gardens, London

Turner earliest known curvilinear conservatory from 1833 at Colebrooke, County Fermanagh. In 1834, he set up the Hammersmith ironworks in Ballsbridge. It was from here that he made the lightest iron structures of the time using wrought iron ribs linked with cast iron tubes. One of his key patrons was Ninian Niven, the director of the National Botanic Gardens at Glasnevin. Turner built the east side of the Palm House for the Gardens in 1834, and potentially the miniature version which is attached to Niven's house in Monkstown.

Turner designed and constructed the railway sheds at Westland Row and at the Broadstone in Dublin, and Lime Street in Liverpool, but also turned his hand to the design and manufacture of railings, boilers, cisterns and bedsteads. His entry in Thom’s directory for 1849 describes him as ‘manufacturer of wrought-iron gates, railway conservatories, hothouses etc., and hot water engineer’, indicating the broad range of activities which the firm undertook.

Turner entered the initial competition for designs for the London International Exhibition of 1851 and out of 233 entries was jointly awarded the second prize along with an entry by Hector Horeau. The final built design was The Crystal Palace by Joseph Paxton.

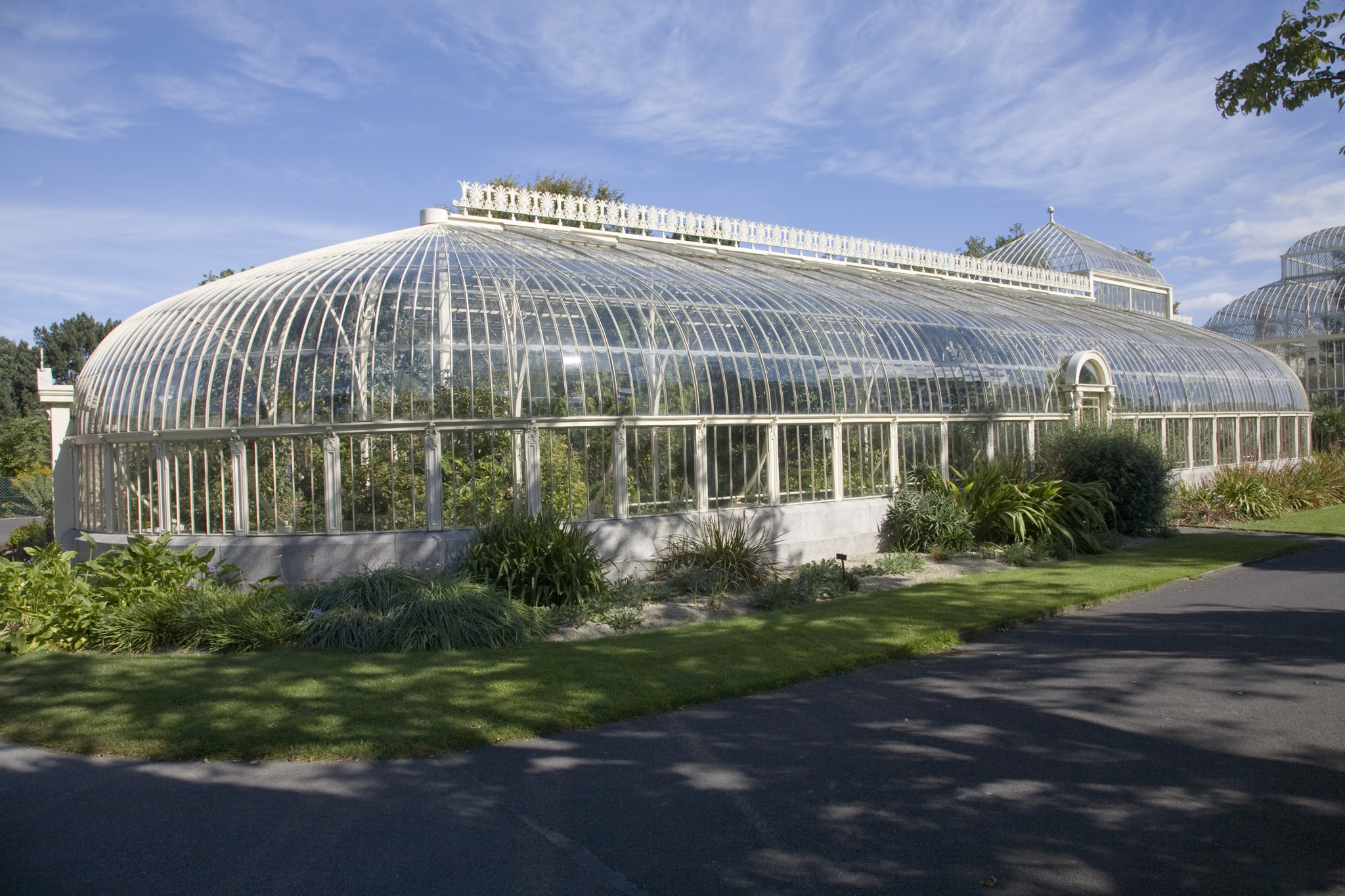
Turner's Curvilinear Range of glasshouses at the Irish National Botanic Gardens

== Premises ==
Turner's premises from the 1830s was at Hammersmith Works, Ballsbridge. The site was later owned by the building firm G&T Crampton until 1963, and is now the site of Hume House offices. In Samuel Lewis’s 1837 Topographical Dictionary of Ireland, he describes the new Hammersmith Works as part of the entry for ‘Ball’s-Bridge’ as follows: ‘Near the village are the Hammersmith iron-works, established in 1834 by Mr. R. Turner: the front of this extensive establishment is 200 feet long, presenting a handsome façade towards the road; and at the back are numerous dwelling houses for the workmen, which are called the Hammersmith cottages. The road on which these works are situated has been greatly improved; wide footpaths have been formed, and the whole is lighted with gas. Nearly adjoining the works are the botanical gardens belonging to Trinity College’.

== Selected works ==
- Marlfield, Clonmel, County Tipperary (1835–40)
- Bellvue at Enniskillen (1835)
- The wings of the palm house at Belfast Botanic Gardens (1839–40)
- Temperate House, Kew Gardens with Decimus Burton
- Palm house, Kew Gardens with Burton
- Waterlily House, Kew Gardens with Burton
- The winter garden at Regent's Park, London (1845) dismantled in 1932
- Roofs at Dublin Broadstone railway station (1847)
- Rath House, Ballybrittas, County Laois (1847–50)

== Sources ==
- Dictionary of Irish Architects Richard Turner entry
- Curvilinear Range information
- Lewis, S. (1837) A Topographical Dictionary of Ireland, London.
- Thom, A. (1849) Dublin Street Directory, Dublin.
