= Temperate House, Kew Gardens =

Temperate House
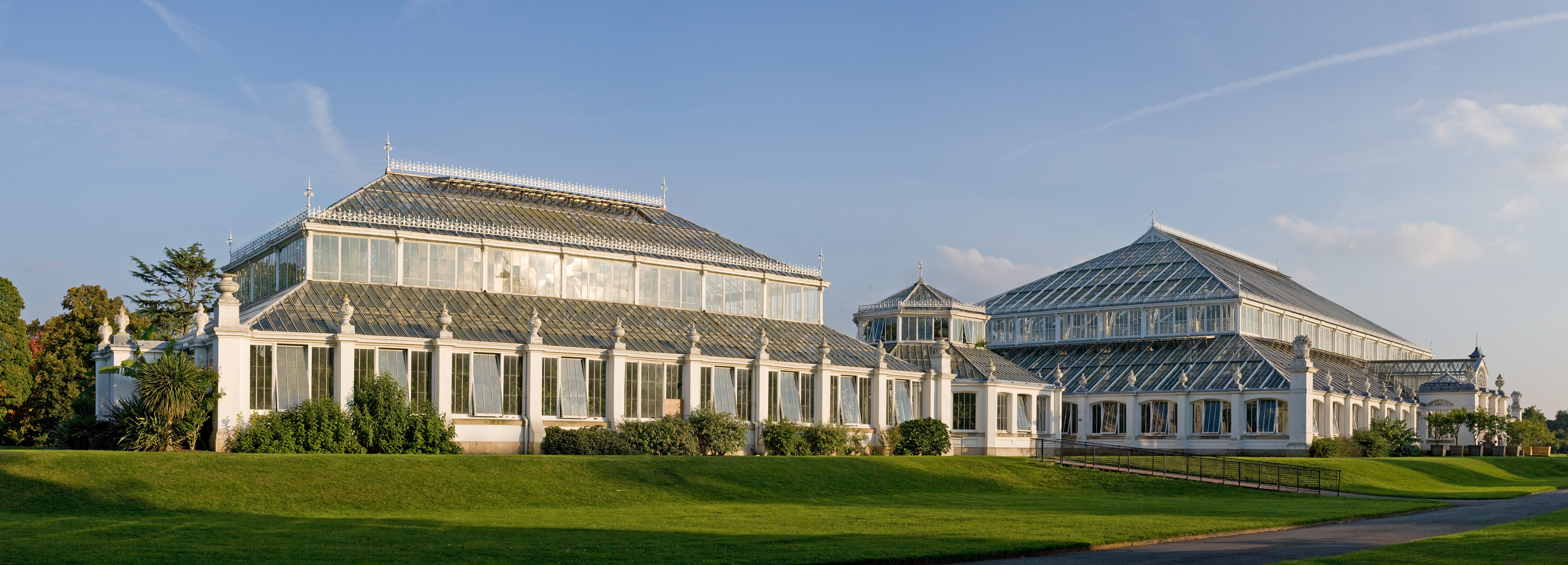
- Panoramic view of the Temperate House

- Location within London Borough of Richmond upon Thames
- 51.474664°N 0.295470°W
- Type: Greenhouse
- Location: Kew Gardens, London

History
- Built: 1860–97

Site notes
- Height: 62 ft (19 m)
- Area: 52,527 ft2 (4,880 m2)
- Architect(s): Decimus Burton, Richard Turner
- Architectural style: Renaissance Revival
- Restored: 2014–15
- Restored by: Donald Insall Associates
- Current use: Greenhouse
- Owner: Royal Botanic Gardens, Kew
- Website: www.kew.org/kew-gardens/whats-in-the-gardens/temperate-house

Listed Building – Grade I
- Official name: Temperate House
- Designated: 10 January 1950
- Reference no.: 1262590

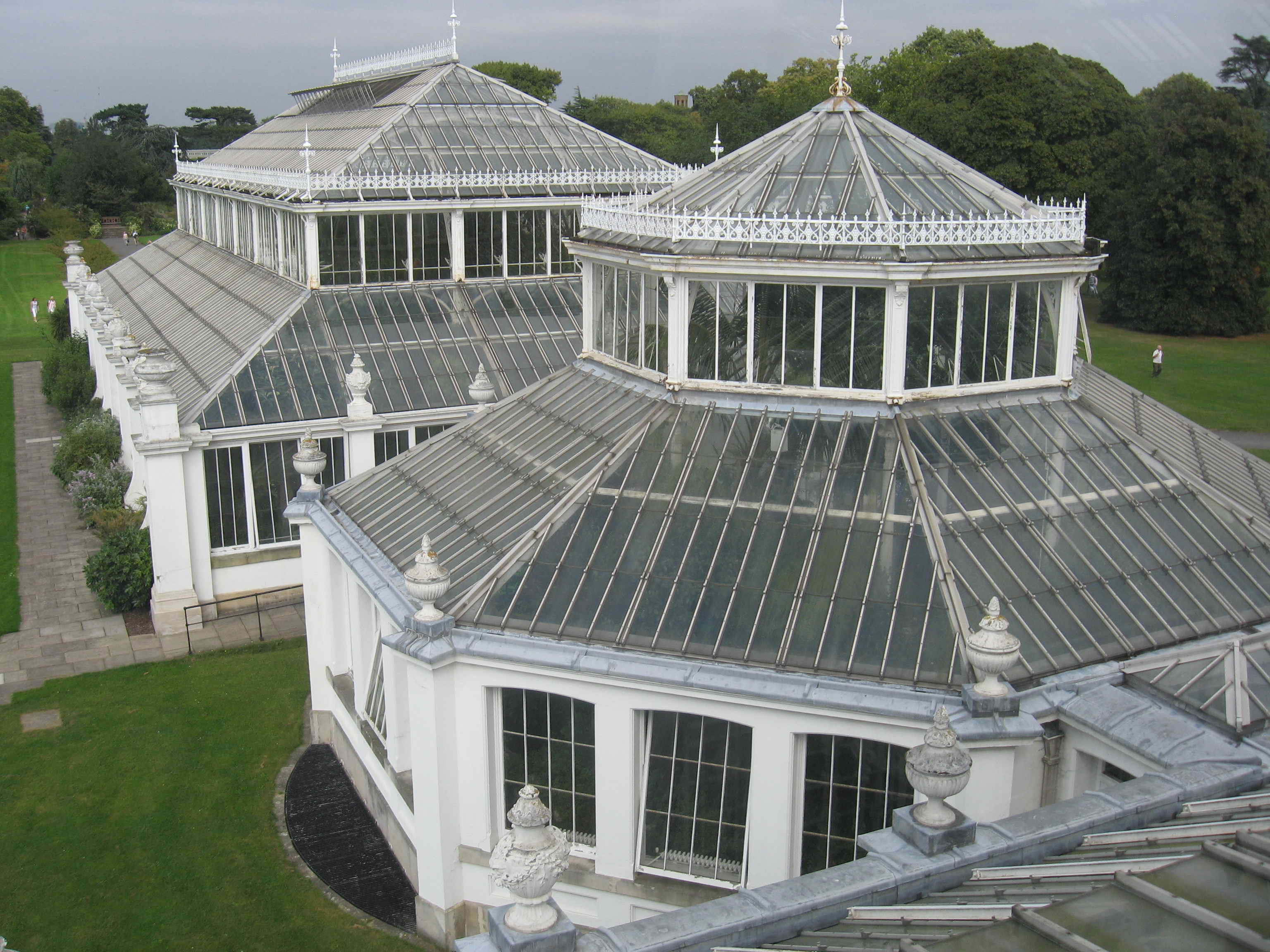
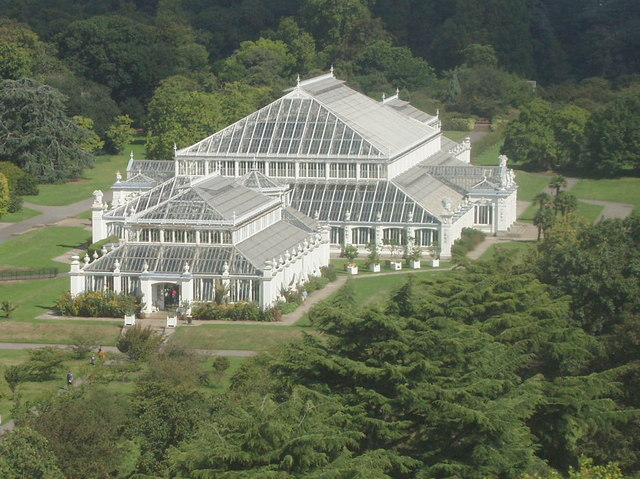
At 628ft long the Temperate House is the largest surviving Victorian glasshouse in the world, twice the size of the Palm House, also designed by architect Decimus Burton and iron-founder Richard Turner.

The Temperate House, opened in May 1863, is a Grade I-listed showhouse for the largest plants in Kew Royal Botanic Gardens. Rectangular, with pitched roofs, its pillars support wrought-iron ribs. Decimus Burton and Irish engineer, Richard Turner, the designers, gave the House a mix of decorative motifs, finials, pediments, acanthus leaf capitals, Coade stone urns and statues. According to Greg Redwood, Kew's head of glasshouses, "The effect is similar to the contemporary iron pier pavilions of Eugenius Birch."

Although construction began in 1860, it would not be completed until 1899. It was positioned to be the first feature visitors saw as they entered the gates with the anticipated coming of the first railway station at Kew expected to be at the end of the adjacent avenue. However, Kew Gardens rail station was built 500 yards to the north, leaving the glasshouse "somewhat stranded in the landscape".

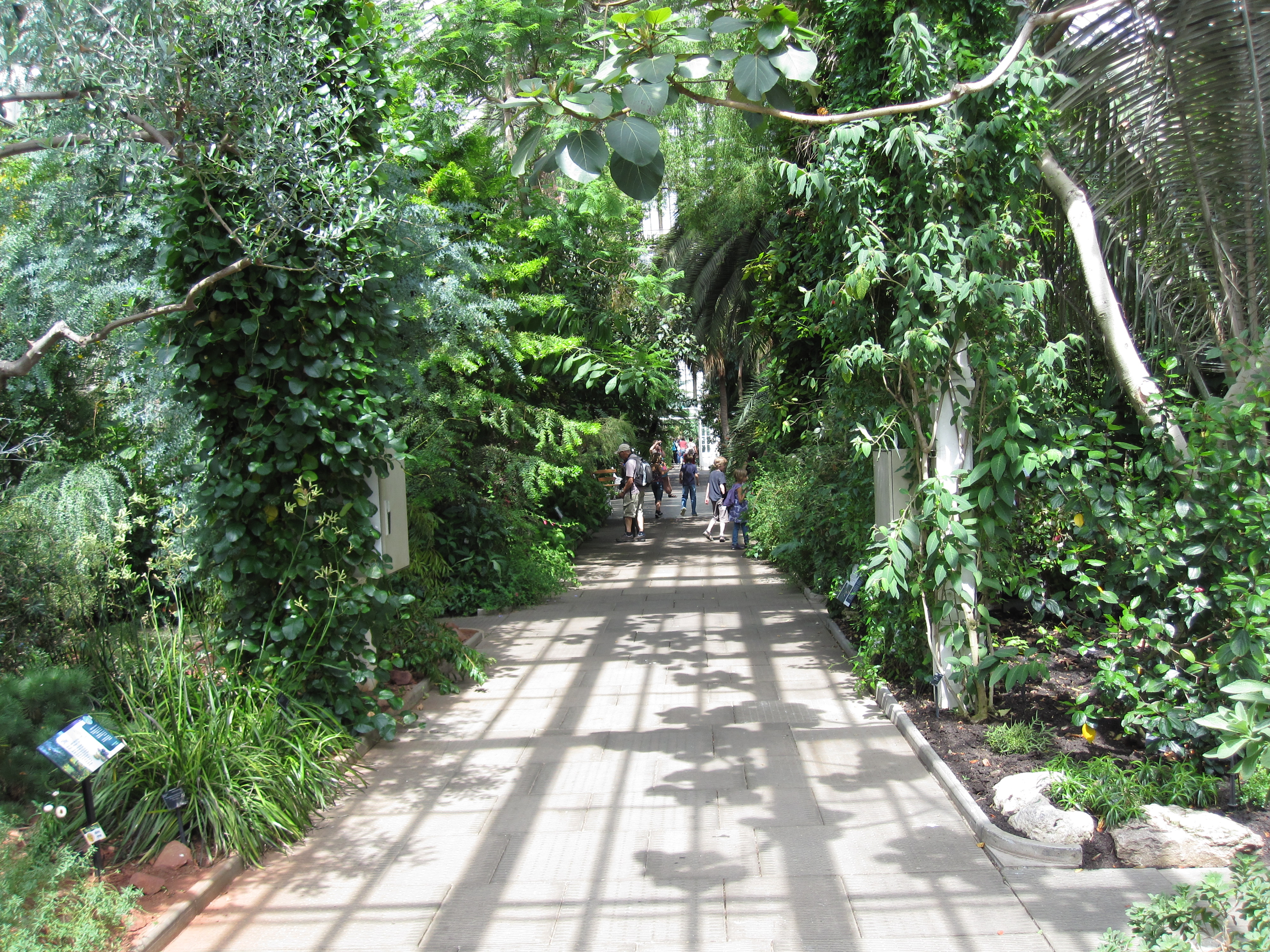
Inside the temperate house

Another view inside the Temperate House

In 2011 Kew launched a £15m public appeal to address necessary repairs to the Temperate House. An early exercise in cast- and wrought-iron and glass construction, the building is structurally sound but the Victorians hid utilitarian features like drainpipes inside the stone columns. Water round the edge of the building led to rust on the iron to push against the masonry which was falling away. Decorative features made of wood were rotting. It last underwent a major restoration in the early 1980s. The building was restored during 2014–15 by Donald Insall Associates, based on their conservation management plan.

There is a viewing gallery in the central section from which visitors are able to look down on that part of the collection. It was re-opened to the public in May 2018.
