= InSpiral Lounge =

London restaurant and events venue

Coordinates: 51°32′29″N 0°8′47″W

- Interactive map of InSpiral Lounge

Restaurant information
- Established: 16 December 2007
- Closed: 6 January 2016
- Previous owner: Dominik Schnell
- Location: London, United Kingdom

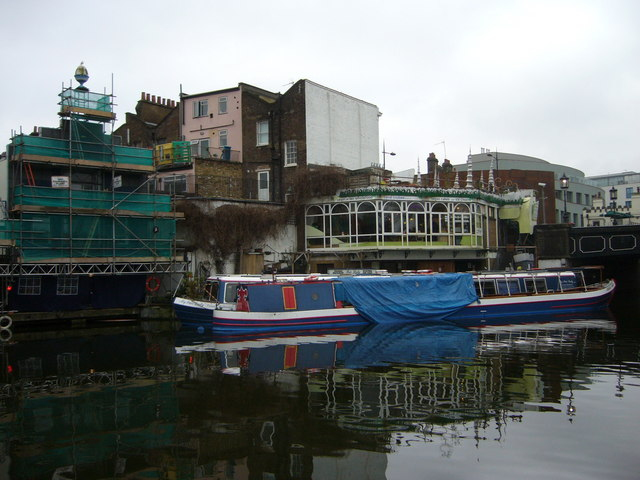
The inSpiral Lounge and Walkers Quay in Camden Lock

Map showing the location of The inSpiral Lounge in London.

The InSpiral Lounge was an organic vegan restaurant, eco-café and events venue in Camden Lock, Camden, London, England, overlooking the Regent's Canal and Camden Market until its closure in 2016. It was the trading name of Ekopia Ltd.

== History ==
The inSpiral Lounge was founded by Dominik Schnell, plus a team of investors, and opened on 16 December 2007. Annabella Willink was further appointed as co-director on 15 March 2010. Since its opening, the organisation had clear policies on nutrition, environment, music and creativity. It aimed to promote mindful choices and community spirit in a laid back yet energised setting.

In the evening the venue hosted live music performances and spoken word along with DJs well known in ambient electronica circles. The venue regularly served as a backdrop for artwork from visionary artists. The premises were shared with Walkers Quay, which organises regular boat trips and dinners along the Regent's Canal to Little Venice.

inSpiral Lounge evolved from a previous project, IDSpiral, which ran an organic café and a replenishing chill out area, complete with nature inspired sculptures and light installations, at festivals such as Glastonbury and The Glade.

inSpiral Lounge permanently closed to the public on 6 January 2016

== Food and drink ==
The menu was organic and vegan, and specialised in gluten-free cuisine as well as incorporating a raw food menu It also included a juice and superfood smoothie bar, organic cocktail bar, medicinal mushroom infused coffees and their own range of 14 flavours of raw vegan sugar-free soft serve ice creams. In 2011 it branched out into a secondary wholesale organic living foods business making and selling a range of 33 products including kale chips, cakes, crackers, granolas and raw chocolate. They operated an online shop where amount their foods and nutritional supplement one could also pick up ambient and electronic music CDs.

It was one of the first establishments in London to provide such an offering.

== Music ==
The venue had a built in DJ booth and hosted live music with open mic nights and notable DJs and performances by artists such as Gaudi, Dreadzone Sound System, Carbon Based Lifeforms, Raja Ram, Banco de Gaia, Alex Patterson from The Orb, Ott, System 7, Eat Static, Astralasia, Mixmaster Morris, Space Tribe, Matt Black from Coldcut and The Dub Pistols.

== Festivals and outdoor catering ==
The inSpiral Lounge provided catering, music stages and cafes at several notable events and festivals including The Glade Festival, Glastonbury Festival, Festival of Life, Camden Green Fair, Secret Garden Party amongst others.

== Awards ==
In 2009 it won the Archant Food and Drink Awards for the best Theme restaurant and best Take-out in London. It was also voted one of the top ten vegetarian restaurants in 2009 by the Vegetarian Society and was nominated as Finalist in the Archant Environmental Awards as the most environmental small business category.

== Capital Growth roof garden ==
The inSpiral Lounge was involved with London's Capital Growth Project, an initiative run in partnership with the Mayor of London Boris Johnson, London Food Link and the Big Lottery's Local Food Fund aiming to create 2012 new community food growing spaces across London by the end of 2012. inSpiral is growing space number 93 and is in the process of building a roof garden where food for the restaurant can be grown locally rather than flown in from abroad. Further to the involvement with Capital Growth, in March 2009 The inSpiral Lounge approached Boris Johnson and Camden Council directly, requesting the use of land near Hawley Wharf for development into a growing space. The request was turned down by the owner, a large Brewery and the land next to Hawley Wharf remains a derelict eyesore to this day.

== See also ==
- List of vegetarian and vegan restaurants
