= Francis Terry =

Francis Terry may refer to:

- Francis Terry (architect) (born 1969), British architect
- Francis Terry (cricketer) (1860–1936), English cricketer
