= London Central Mosque =

Mosque in London, England

- Regent's Park Mosque
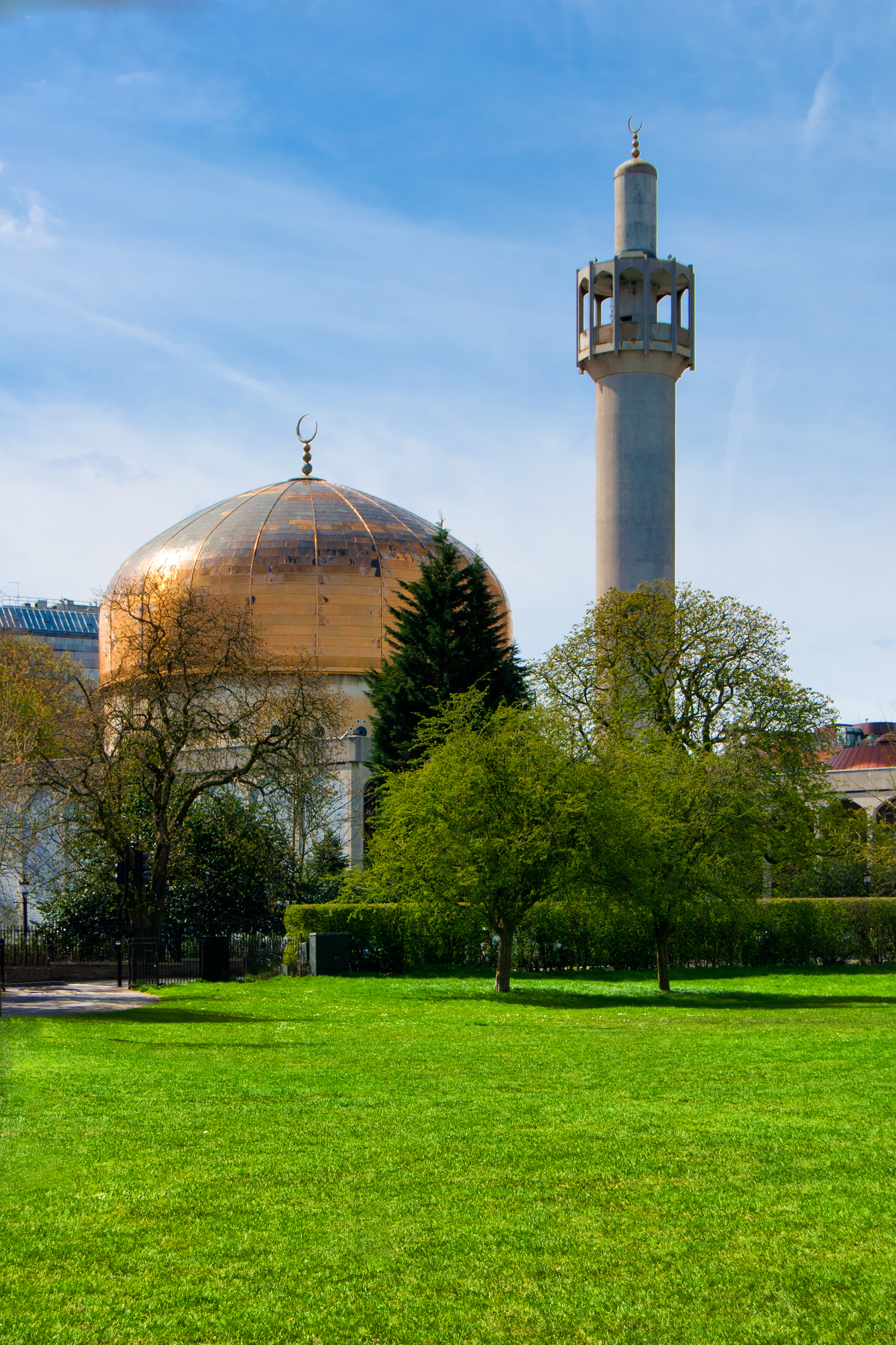
- Outside view of mosque

- Location in Central London

Religion
- Affiliation: Sunni Islam
- Ecclesiastical or organizational status: Mosque
- Leadership: Director General: Dr Ahmad Al Dubayan
- Status: Active

Location
- Location: London, NW8
- Country: United Kingdom
- Interactive map of London Central Mosque
- Administration: London Central Mosque Trust Ltd.
- Coordinates: 51°31′45″N 0°09′55″W

Architecture
- Architect: Frederick Gibberd
- Type: Mosque
- Style: Islamic Architecture; Modern
- Established: 1977; 49 years ago
- Construction cost: £6.5 million

Specifications
- Capacity: 5,400 worshippers
- Dome: 1
- Minaret: 1

Website
- www.iccuk.org

The London Central Mosque (also known as the Regent's Park Mosque) is an Islamic place of worship located on the edge of Regent's Park in the City of Westminster.

== Design and location ==
It was designed by Sir Frederick Gibberd, completed in 1977, and has a prominent golden dome. The main hall can accommodate over 5,000 male worshippers, with women praying on a balcony overlooking the hall. The mosque holds a chandelier and a vast carpet, with very little furniture.

The inside of the dome is decorated with sacred geometry in the Islamic tradition and has small stained glass windows around its base, containing turquoise coloured 16-pointed stars. There is also a small bookshop and halal café on the premises. The mosque is joined to the Islamic Cultural Centre (ICC) which was officially opened by King George VI in 1944. The land was donated by George VI to the Muslim community of Britain in return for the donation of land in Cairo by King Farouk of Egypt and Sudan on which to build an Anglican cathedral.

The mosque is located near Winfield House, the official residence of the United States Ambassador, and the six villas designed by Quinlan Terry, some of which are private residences for Arab royal families.The Islamic calligraphy was completed by Hassan El-Abhar in 1989.

== History ==
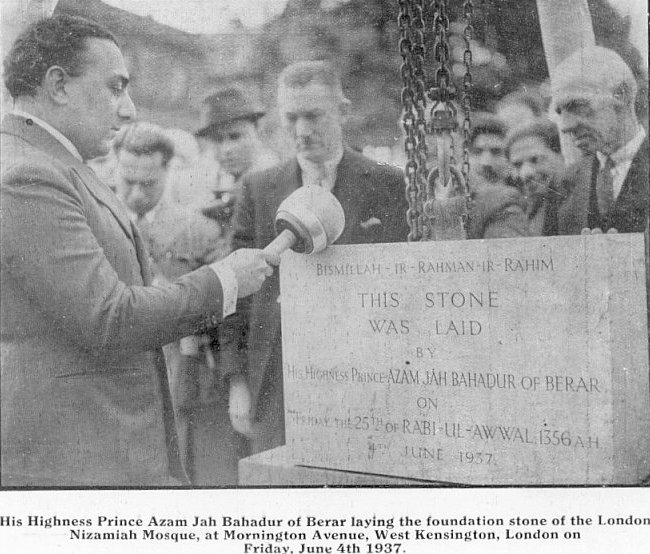
Prince Azam Jah son of Ruler of Hyderabad State, Asaf Jah VII laying the foundation stone of the mosque

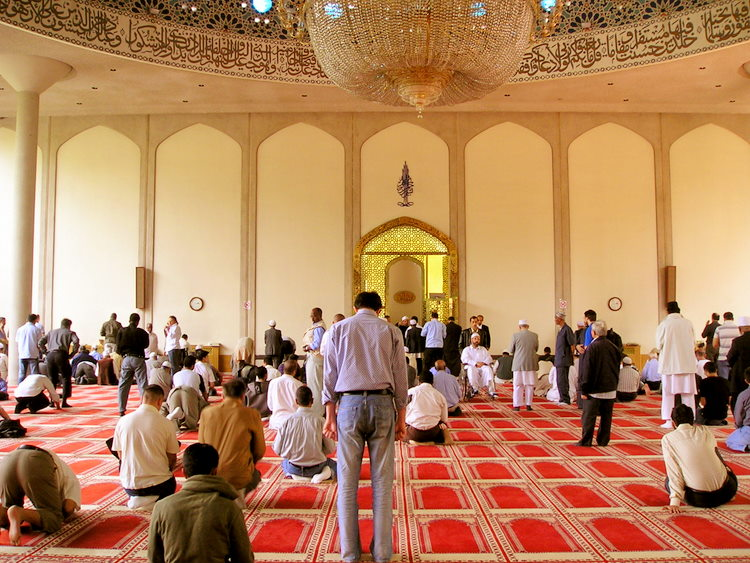
Interior of prayer hall, taken after Friday prayers

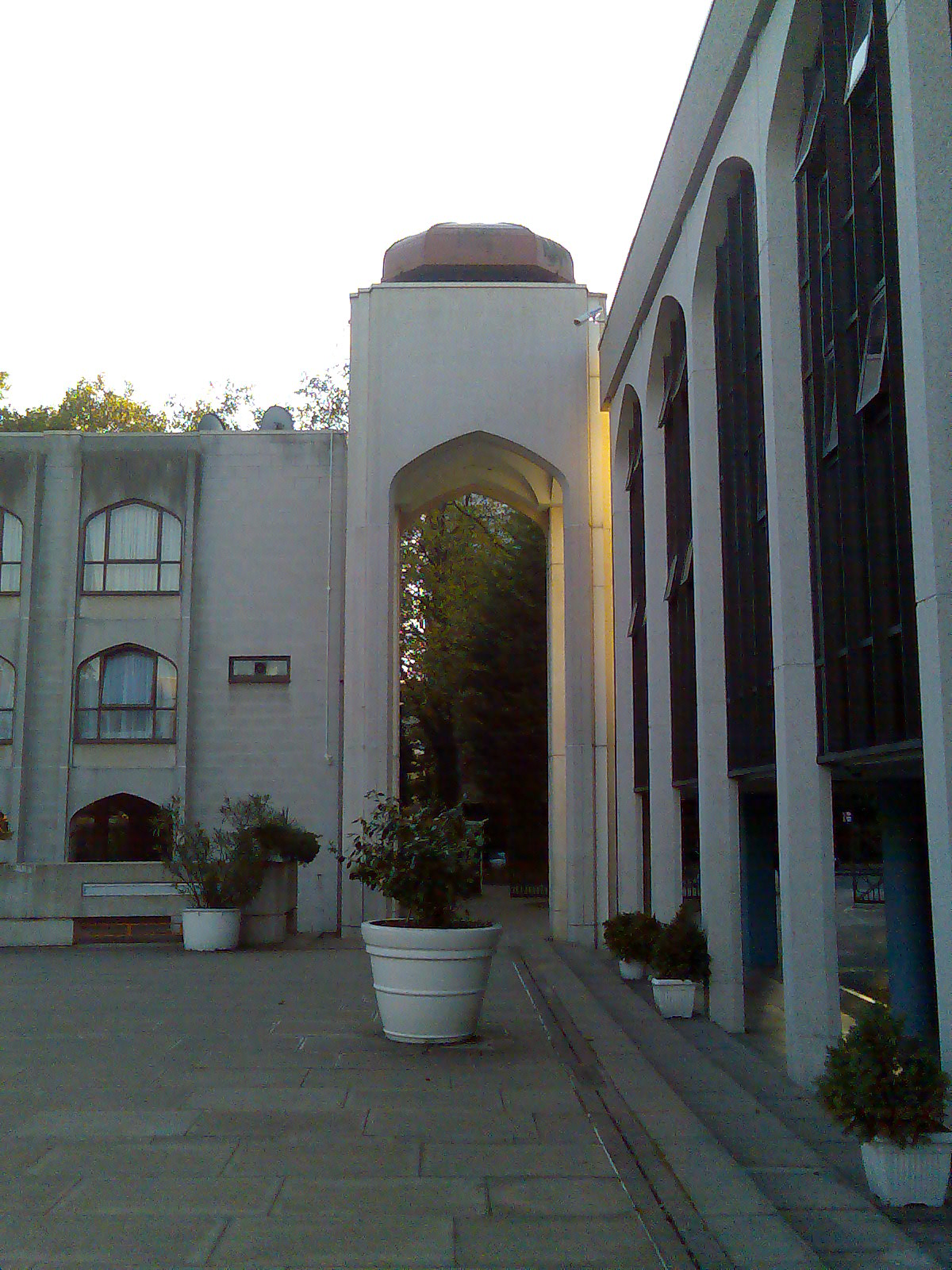
Entrance

1900–1931 Several efforts were made to build a mosque in London, including one initiated by Lord Headley, a convert to Islam.

1937 This project (Nizamia Mosque, later changed to present name) was funded by the Nizam of Hyderabad, India, and the foundation stone of the mosque was laid on 4 June 1937, by HH Prince Azam Jah – eldest son of Mir Osman Ali Khan – the last ruler of the largest princely state of India, Hyderabad State.

1939 Lord Lloyd of Dolobran (1879–1941), then Chairman of the British Council, works with a Mosque Committee, comprising various prominent Muslims and Ambassadors in London.

1940 Lord Lloyd, now Secretary of State for the Colonies, sends a memo to the Prime Minister Winston Churchill, in which he points out, inter-alia "only London contains more [Muslims] than any other European capital but that in our empire which actually contains more Moslems (sic) than Christians it was anomalous and inappropriate that there should be no central place of worship for Mussulmans (sic). The gift, moreover of a site for a mosque would serve as a tribute to the loyalty of the Moslems of the [British] Empire and would have a good effect on Arab countries of the Middle East". The British Government is persuaded to present a site for a mosque in London for the Muslim community of Great Britain. On 24 October the Churchill War Cabinet authorises allocation of £100,000 for acquisition of a mosque site in London. The intent was to enable Muslims in Britain to build a mosque and an Islamic Cultural Centre, so they could conduct affairs pertaining to their faith.

1944 The Mosque Committee comprising various prominent Muslim diplomats and Muslim residents in the United Kingdom accepted the gift and The Islamic Cultural Centre which includes the London Central Mosque, was established and officially opened in November by His Majesty King George VI.

1947 The Mosque Committee registered the London Central Mosque Trust Limited as a Trust Corporation in September. At the time, seven representatives from six Muslim countries acted as Trustees.

1954–1967 Several designs were considered for the mosque. There were long protracted planning applications to various authorities but the necessary planning approval was not granted.

1969 An Open International Competition was held for the design of the building. Over one hundred designs were submitted, from both Muslim and non-Muslim applicants. The design finally selected was by the English architect Frederick Gibberd. His design of The Main Mosque Building Complex can be divided into two elements: The main building consisting of the two prayer halls and three-story wings including an entrance hall, library, reading room, administration offices and the minaret;

£2 Million of funding was donated for the construction of the ICC by His Majesty King Faisal Bin Abdul Aziz Al-Saud of Saudi Arabia. A further donation was provided by Sheikh Zayed bin Sultan Al Nahyan ruler of Abu Dhabi and President of the United Arab Emirates.

1974 Construction work by John Laing & Son began early this year with the Main Mosque Building Complex, comprising Men's and Ladies' Main Prayer Halls, Library, Administrative Block and Residential Quarters.

1977 Work was completed in July for the total cost of £6.5 million. The first Director of the Islamic Centre was the Raja of Mahmudabad. A special fund paid for a new Educational & Administrative wing which was completed in 1994. This was donated by the king of Saudi Arabia Fahd bin Abdul Aziz.

2007 The programme Undercover Mosque, an episode of Channel 4 documentary Dispatches, claimed that extremist preaching takes place at the mosque.

2011 The Guantanamo Bay files leak revealed that 35 Guantanamo Bay detainees had passed through both Regent's Park Mosque and Finsbury Park Mosque.

2018 Mosque given Grade II* listed status.

== See also ==
- Islam in London
- Islam in the United Kingdom
- Islamic schools and branches
- List of mosques
- List of mosques in the United Kingdom
- Londonistan
