= Quinlan Terry =

British architect (born 1937)

Quinlan Terry CBE
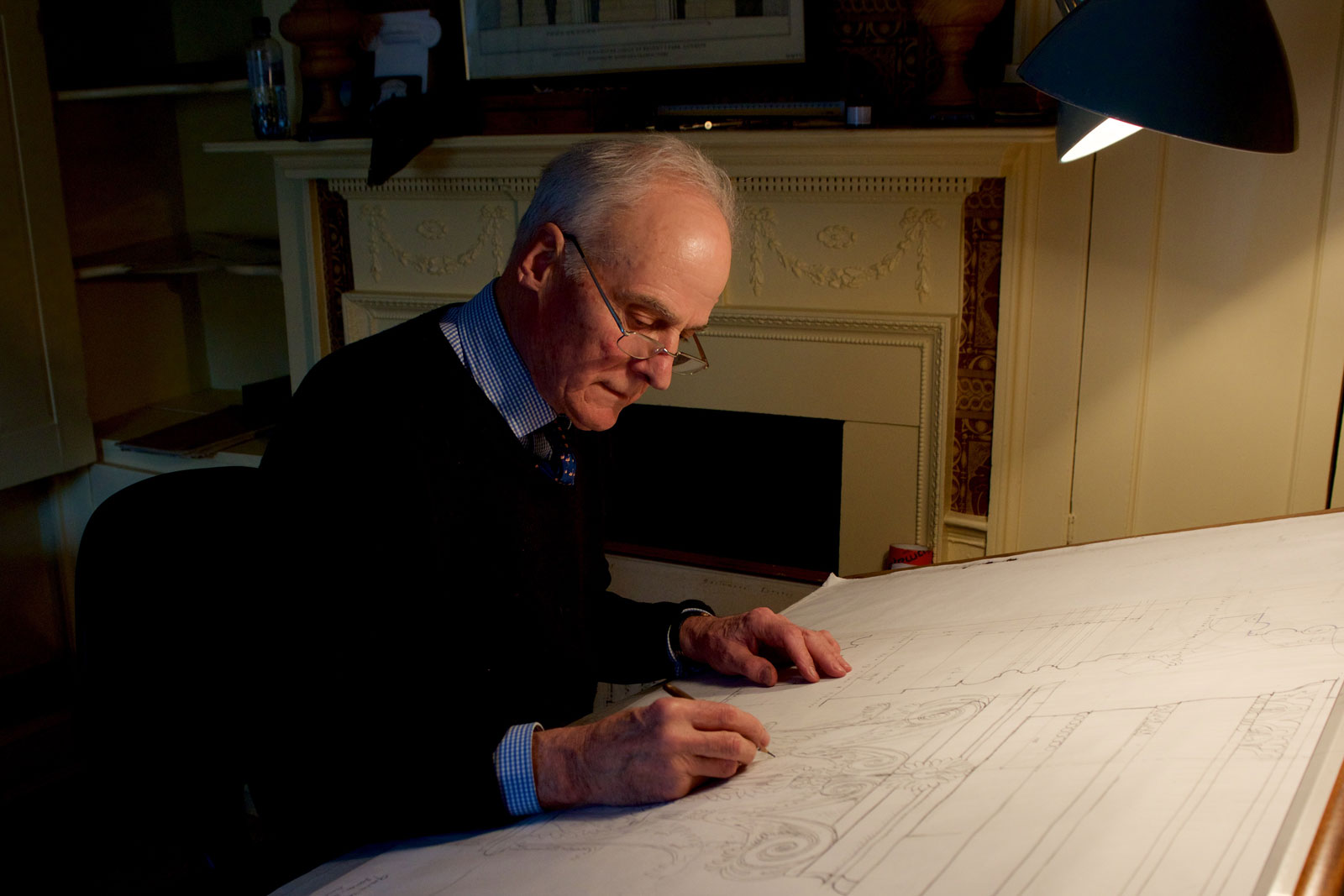
- Quinlan Terry in 2018
- Born: John Quinlan Terry; 24 July 1937 (age 89); Hampstead, London, England, U.K.
- Occupation: Architect
- Spouse: Christina de Ruttié
- Children: 5, including Francis Terry
- Practice: Quinlan Terry Architects
- Buildings: The Maitland Robinson Library, Downing College, Cambridge; Brentwood Cathedral addition Regent's Park villas Richmond Riverside Development
- Projects: 10 Downing Street, London, England. (1980’s interior refurbishment); St Helen's Bishopsgate restoration

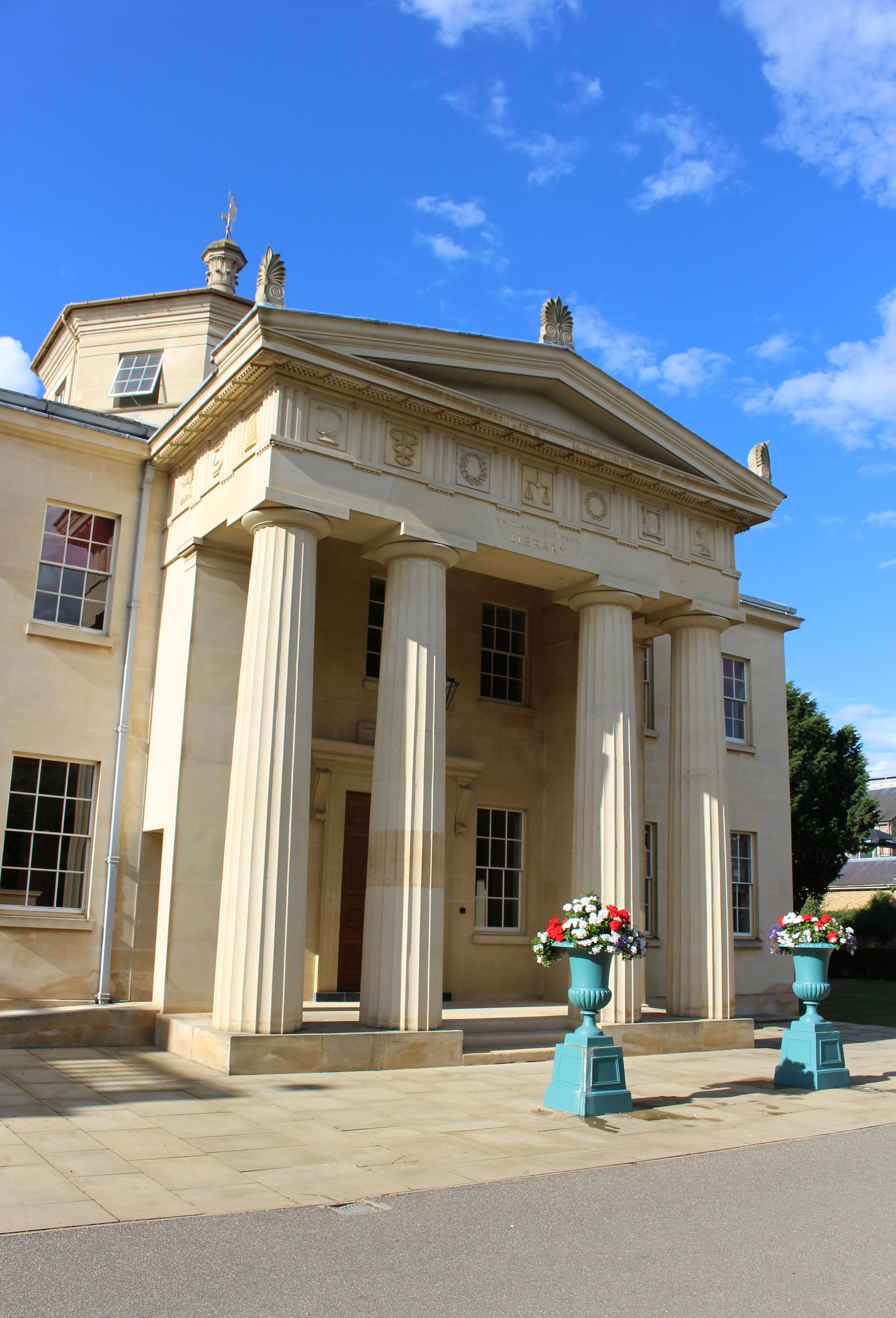
The 1992 Maitland Robinson Library at Downing College, Cambridge, designed by Terry

John Quinlan Terry CBE (born 24 July 1937) is a British former architect. He was educated at Bryanston School and the Architectural Association School of Architecture. He was a pupil of architect Raymond Erith, with whom he formed the partnership Erith & Terry.

Quinlan Terry is a well-known representative of New Classical architecture and the favourite architect of King Charles III. He has a keen interest in how traditional architecture contributes to the debate on sustainability and has lectured frequently on the subject. In 2026, Quinlan retired from architecture to focus on his health.

== Early life and education ==
Terry was educated at Bryanston School and the Architectural Association School of Architecture.

== Work ==
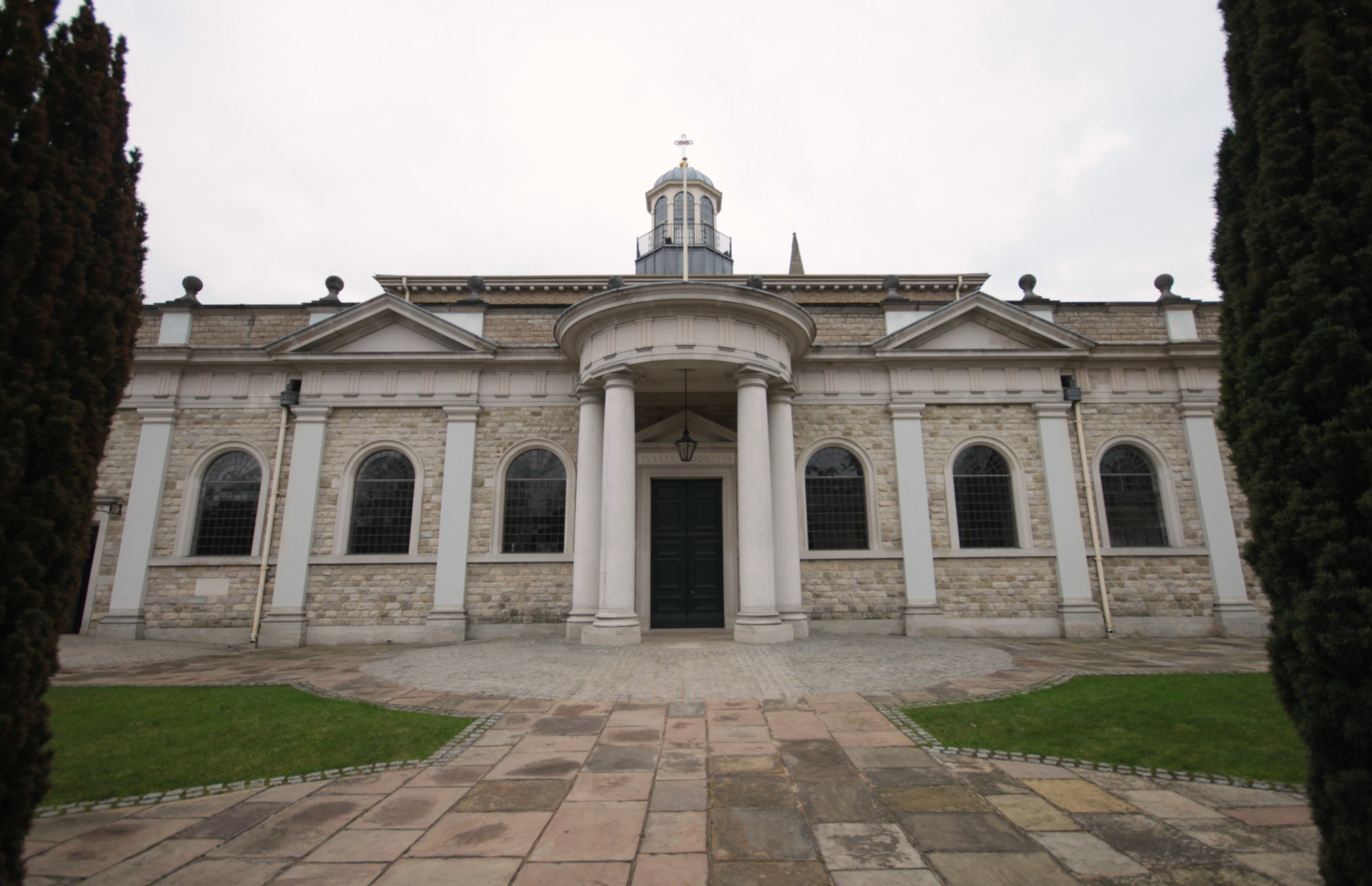
Brentwood Cathedral

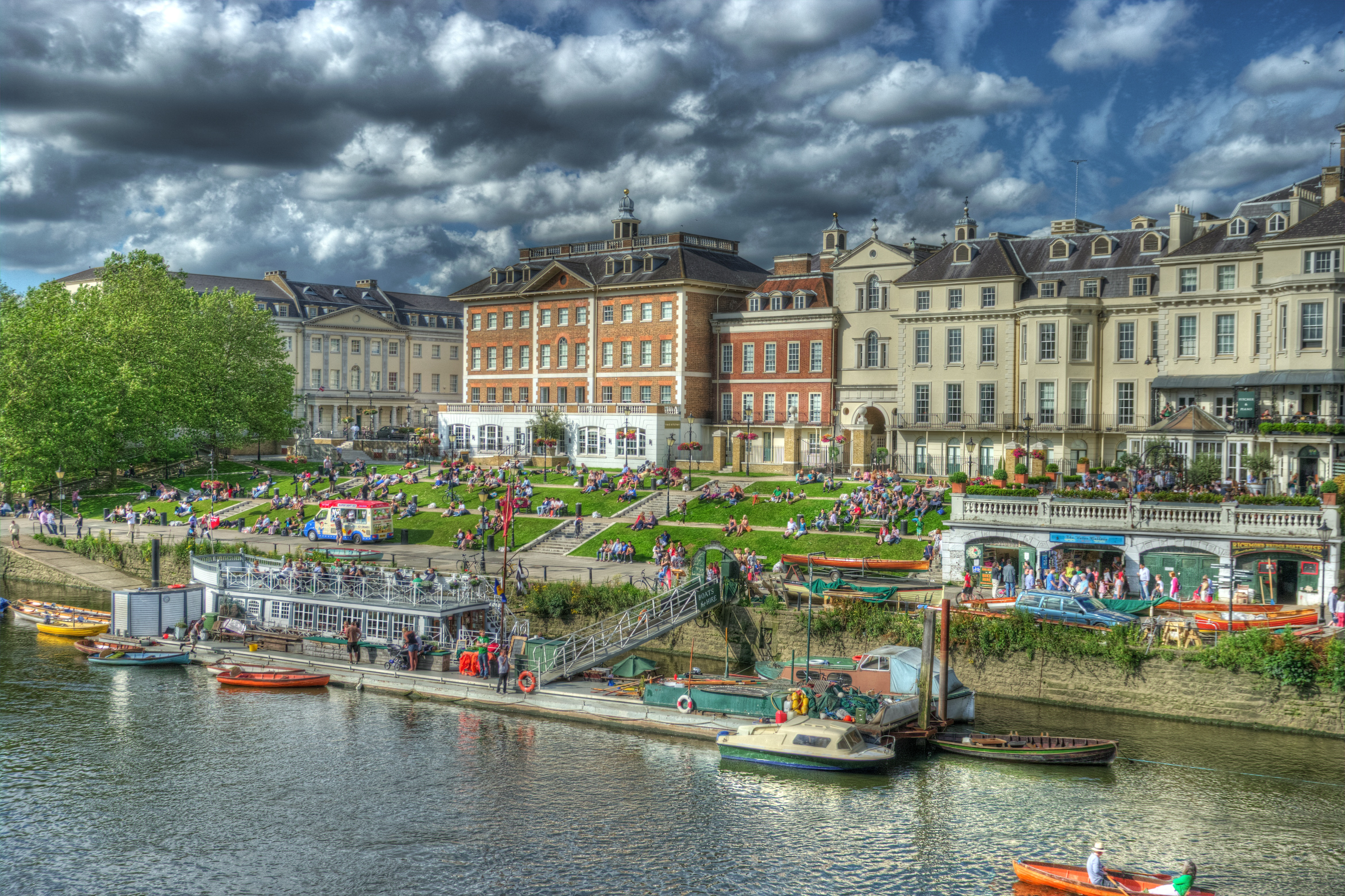
Richmond Riverside, London, 1984–87

Terry worked principally in classical Palladian architectural styles. The firm, Quinlan Terry Architects LLP, continues the architectural style of the practice started by Raymond Erith in 1928, and specialises in high quality traditional building, mostly in classical idioms. The practice is based in Dedham, Essex, and employs a staff of twelve. A book about the firm's work, written by David Watkin, entitled Radical Classicism: The Architecture of Quinlan Terry (New York: Rizzoli International Publications), was published in 2006.

The first work by Raymond Erith in which Quinlan Terry had a major role was the new house, Kings Waldenbury, Hertfordshire, completed for the Pilkington family in 1971, when new building in a classical manner was deeply unfashionable with the architectural establishment (though it was more popular with the general public). During the three-year construction period of the house, Terry kept a diary, published later, in which he bemoaned the modern world and stoically defended his conservative, reformed, evangelical faith.

His design for the 1992 Maitland Robinson Library at Downing College, Cambridge, won the Building of the Year Award in 1994. One of his best known works is Brentwood Cathedral in Essex. This is a radical extension of a 19th-century Roman Catholic Gothic Revival church is in the English Baroque manner owing much to James Gibbs and Thomas Archer and makes little or no attempt to be in keeping with the older building. Terry's new work has a portico based on the south portico of St Paul's Cathedral designed by Sir Christopher Wren. Unusually, all five classical orders of architecture were used and Terry has said in lectures that he views classical architecture as an expression of the divine order.

During the 1980s he was appointed by Margaret Thatcher, then Prime Minister, to renovate the interiors of 10 Downing Street, restored 40 years previously by Raymond Erith, Terry's teacher, after war damage. Terry's work there is more assertive than Erith's. In Gloucestershire, he designed Waverton House, where he used the style made popular by Matthew Brettingham in the late 18th century, featuring a central staircase lit from above, surrounded by rooms on both floors.

In 1989, he designed a series of three new villas for the Crown Estate Commissioners in Outer Circle in London's Regent's Park. Building in the park was controversial but said to be in the spirit of the Prince Regent's original though unrealised intentions for the park, which was to contain numerous villas for Regency courtiers surrounding a new royal palace. Terry's three new villas have near-identical plans, based on Palladio's Villa Saraceno, but the external elevations vary, showing respectively Gothic, Italian Mannerist and muscular Neo-classical features in the manner of William Chambers. Six villas were eventually built between 1989 and 2002.

In the mid-1990s, Terry designed the restoration of St Helen's Bishopsgate, controversially turning the orientation of the medieval church through 90 degrees, moving or removing some fittings, and reworking its previous Tractarian Anglican layout into a Georgian stripped-back meeting house plan informed by the precepts of Reformation theology, in tune with its current firmly evangelical congregation. In the same decade, he designed a castle for David and Frederick Barclay on their private island of Brecqhou in the Channel Islands.

Terry designed the external envelope of New Margaret Thatcher Infirmary at the Royal Hospital Chelsea, with Steffian Bradley Architects as the lead consultant and planners for the building; a new Georgian Theatre for Downing College Cambridge; new offices, retail and residential development at 264–267 Tottenham Court Road, London; offices and retail at 22 Baker Street, London; and Queen Mother Square, Poundbury; and mixed use development Richmond Riverside.

August 2026 cover of Architectural Place, highlighting the retirement of Quinlan

His works in the US include the Abercrombie Residence, a classical mansion based on Marble Hill House, Twickenham, London. Complete with a piano nobile approached by an external staircase, it has a pediment supported by Corinthian columns. The house is constructed of Kasota limestone, with Indiana limestone dressings.

Terry retired as senior partner in July 2026 and was succeeded by his long-time collaborator, Roger Barrell.

== Appraisal ==
Terry's architecture was championed by David Watkin, who wrote the monograph Radical Classicism: The Architecture of Quinlan Terry (2006), and by Roger Scruton who called it "one long breath of fresh air" in his Spectator article "Hail Quinlan Terry: our greatest living architect". In 2026, the writer and editor Clive Aslet, who authored a study of Terry's work in 1986, suggested that Terry be awarded a knighthood.

Quinlan Terry is the single most distinguished and prolific architect at work in the Classical tradition in either Britain or the United States. He has attempted more completely than any other architect in Britain to pull the rug from beneath the false certainties of Modernism

— David Watkin

Conversely, Terry has been the subject of considerable criticism. A 2015 article in the Royal Institute of British Architects (RIBA) Journal quoted the late architectural historian Gavin Stamp, author of the Piloti column in the magazine Private Eye, in which Stamp derided Terry's work as "stiff, pedantic and uninspiring, classical details stuck on to dull boxes". The cultural critic Jonathan Meades, in a 2020 article in The Critic, repeated Stamp's strictures and dismissed Scruton's praise, "[a man] who had no eye", as "embarrassingly silly"; while Stephen Bayley is among those who have attacked the close relationship between Terry and King Charles III. In a column in The Guardian in 2009, Bayley mocked the Prince's circle of architectural advisers as "a coterie of fogeyish misfits, dreamers, forelock-tugging courtiers, DIY specialists, greasy pole-climbers [and] short-sighted antiquarians", reserving particular scorn for Terry, "a specialist in architectural pastiche [whose] modesty and art are in inverse proportion".

== Honours ==
In 2003 Terry won the Best Modern Classical House 2003, awarded by the British Georgian Group for Ferne House in Wiltshire. In 2005 Terry won the 3rd Annual Driehaus Prize, the most prestigious award for outstanding classical and traditional architects. He holds the Philippe Rothier European Prize for the Reconstruction of the City of Archives d'Architecture Moderne (1982).

He was appointed Commander of the Order of the British Empire (CBE) in the 2015 New Year Honours for services to classical architecture.

== See also ==
- New Classical architecture
- Brentwood Cathedral
- Downing College, Cambridge
- A Classical Adventure: The Architectural History of Downing College, Cambridge
- St Helen's Bishopsgate
- Hotham House – Richmond Riverside
- Francis Terry – His son, also an architect
