= Francis Terry (architect) =

British architect (born 1969)

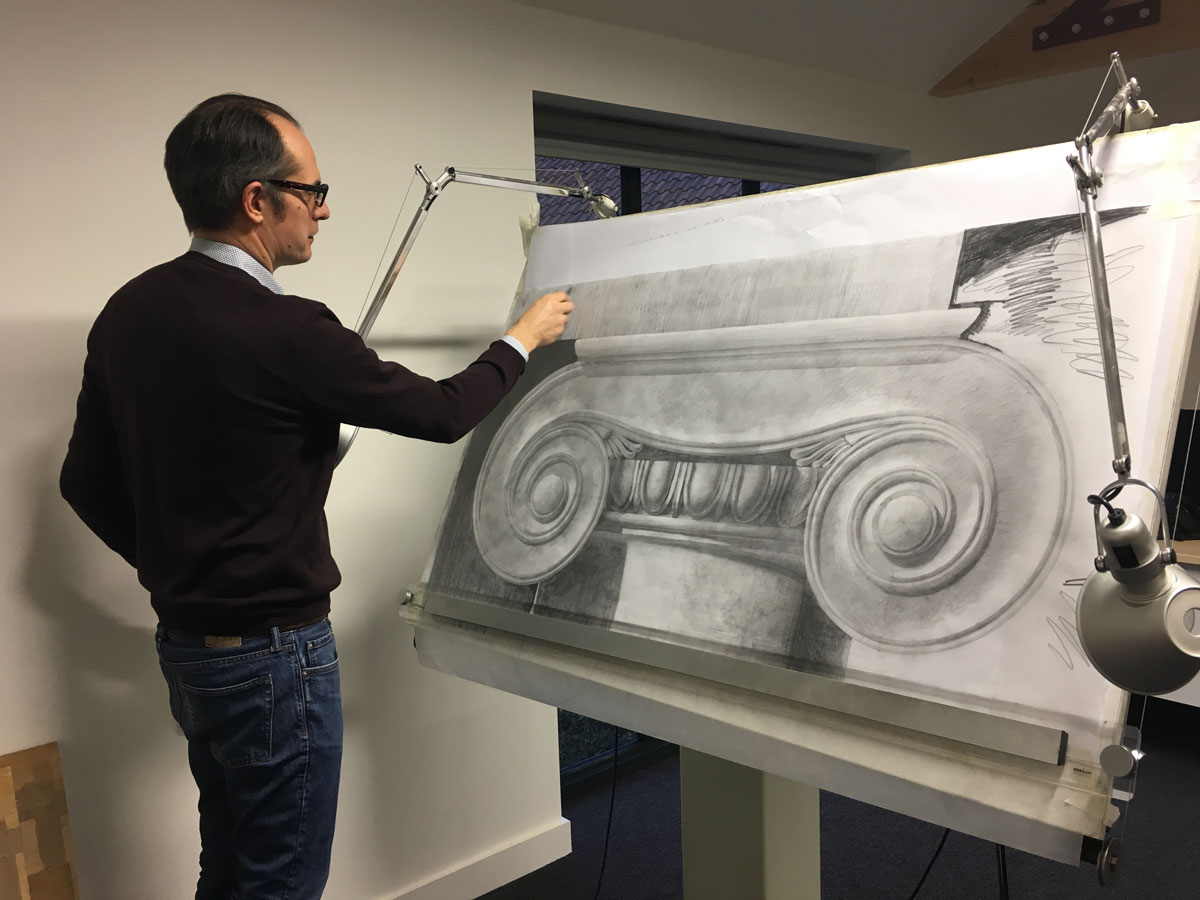
- Francis Terry drawing an ionic capital
- Born: 21 May 1969 (age 56); Dedham, England
- Occupation: Architect
- Awards: Winsor and Newton Young Artist Award from the Royal Institute of Oil Painters, 1997; Silver Medal from the Royal Society of Portrait Painters, 1997; Worshipful Company of Architects Prize for Architectural Drawing, 2002

Francis Terry (born 21 May 1969 in Dedham near Colchester, England) is a British architect. He was educated at Stowe School and Downing College, Cambridge, qualifying as an architect in 1994. He was a pupil (and then partner) of his father, the architect Quinlan Terry.

== Work ==
Like his father, Francis Terry is a well-known representative of New Classical Architecture. Together, they formed the Quinlan and Francis Terry partnership and designed numerous country houses including Ferne Park, Dorset and Kilboy, Co Tipperary, Ireland, of which the architectural historian David Watkin wrote "...is surely the greatest work so far of Quinlan and Francis Terry... [and] one of the finest classical houses of any period.".

“The interior is fabulously rich in plasterwork ornament designed by Francis Terry, whose drawings for it introduce a vibrancy and sensitivity to plant form and associated classical ornament on a scale unparalleled in modern British architecture" description by Professor David Watkin about Hanover Lodge, Regent's Park, London in City Journal, Summer 2010

In 2016, Francis Terry left his father's practice to form Francis Terry and Associates. The work of Francis Terry and Associates has been focused around large country houses, housing developments for Halsbury Homes and (working with Create Streets) community-driven counter proposals for sites in London, including Mount Pleasant, West Hampsted and Empress Place These have been described in the joint book by Francis Terry with Nicholas Boys Smith, Designing Well-Tempered Towns.

Terry is also an artist and uses his talent to draw schemes and paint watercolours of his proposals. He regularly exhibits drawings in the Royal Academy Summer Exhibition.

=== Royal Institute of British Architects ===
In June 2017, Terry was elected chairman of RIBA's Traditional Architecture Group (TAG).

== Awards ==
- Winsor and Newton Young Artist Award from the Royal Institute of Oil Painters, 1997
- Silver Medal from the Royal Society of Portrait Painters, 1997
- Worshipful Company of Architects Prize for Architectural Drawing, 2002
- Traditional Architecture Group, Best Member's Project, 2025

== Quotes ==
"The way I approach beauty is through the rules and motifs of the classical style. For me, there is a magic to these architectural forms and shapes"

"It's funny what most architects respond to. They tend to think if it's popular, there's something wrong with it. I prefer the Andy Warhol approach. If it's popular, it's good."
