= London Green Fair =

Coordinates: 51.5297°N 0.1476°W

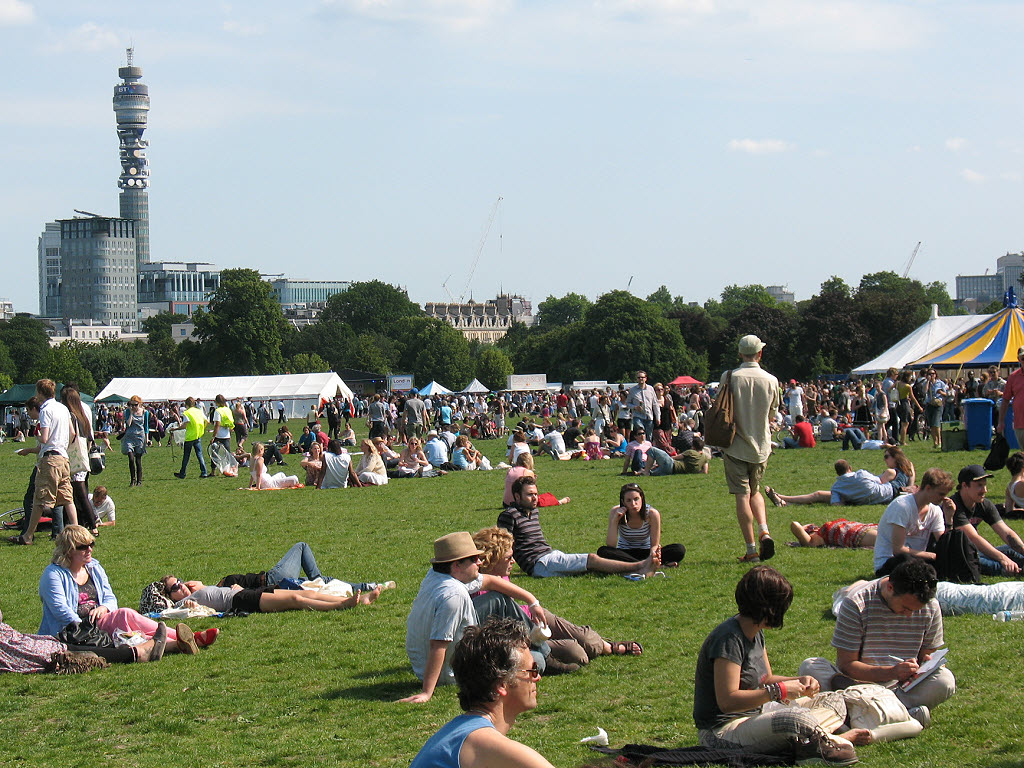
The Fair in 2011

The London Green Fair (previously known as the Camden Green Fair) was an event that has been held on the first Sunday in June in Regent's Park in London, England, coinciding with World Environment Day. Founded in 1982, the Fair aimed to inspire Londoners to help make their capital a world-class green city, letting visitors find out about sustainable companies, products, campaigns, and lifestyle choices.

== History ==
The Camden Green Fair began as a Camden focused event in 1991 by a group of local environmental activists, with the aim of raising awareness within their community of various environmental issues. The Fair was originally held in St. James Gardens. The fair began to grow in size year on year, and in 2005 moved to a much bigger, higher profile site in Regent's Park. In 2008 they held the World's Largest Fairtrade Tea Dance to raise awareness of food sustainability and Fairtrade, and were awarded an Outstanding Award by A Greener Festival Award. The event has not been held since it was announced in April 2013, that that year's event would be postponed.

== Organisation ==
The Camden Green Fair was managed by a registered charity.
