= Quinlan Terry's Regent's Park villas =

Villas in Regent's Park, London, England

Coordinates: 51.5310°N 0.1657°W

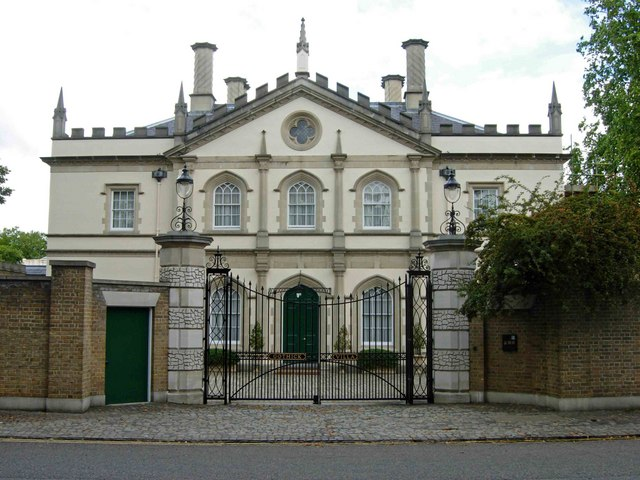
Gothick Villa, Regent's Park

Quinlan Terry's Regent's Park villas are six large detached villas on the north-western edge of London's Regent's Park designed by the English Driehaus Prize winner and New Classical architect Quinlan Terry between 1988 and 2004. Terry designed each house in a different classical style, intended to be representative of the variety of classical architecture: the Ionic Villa, Veneto Villa, Gothick Villa, Corinthian Villa, Regency Villa, and the Doric Villa.

== Location ==
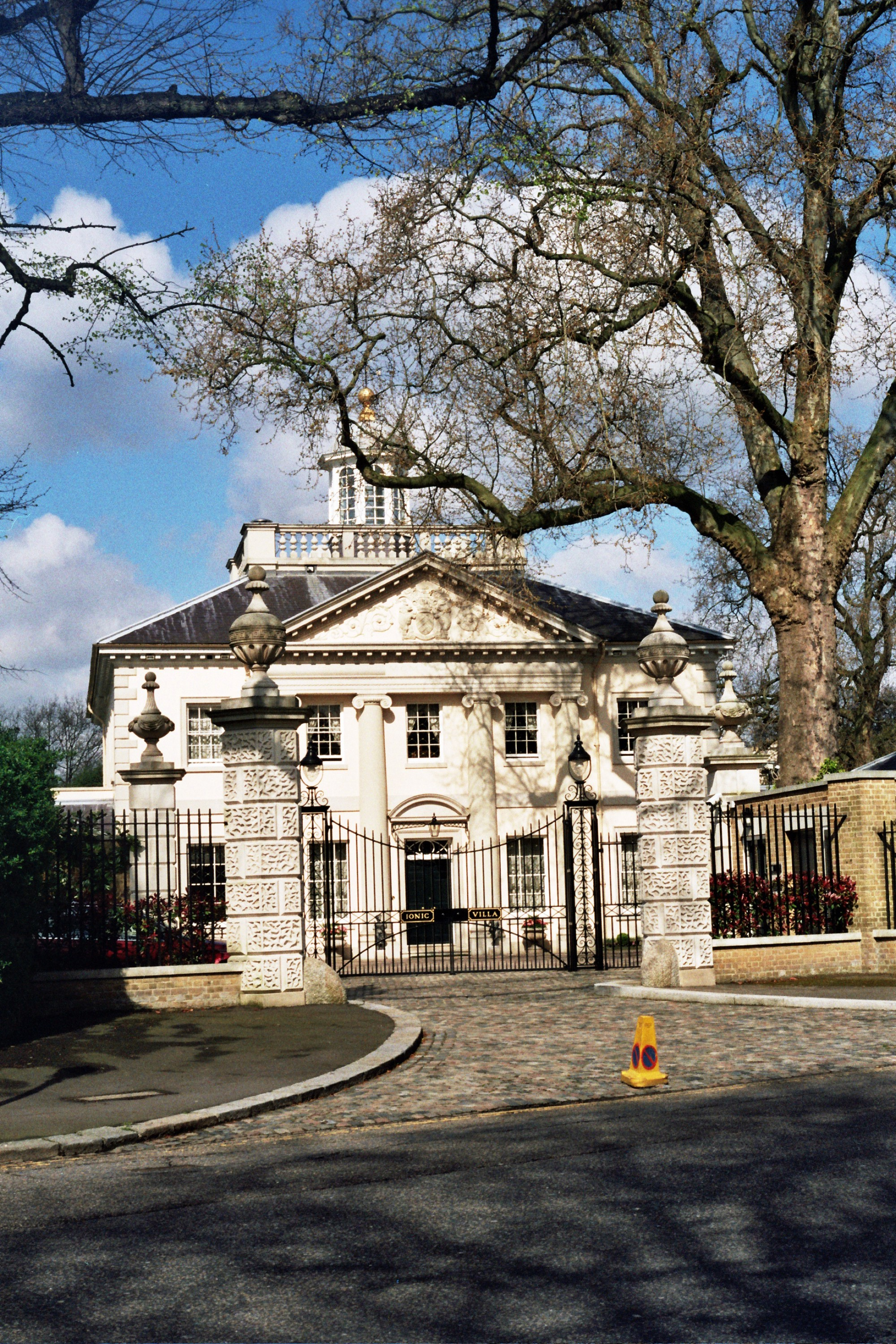
Ionic Villa, Regent's Park

The houses are located on a strip of land between Regent's Park's Outer Circle and the Regent's Canal on the north-western edge of the park, with Hanover Lodge to the south, and opposite Winfield House, the home of the American ambassador, to the east. Grove House is located to the west of the villas on the other bank of the canal. The houses were built by the Crown Estate and a private property developer.

== History ==
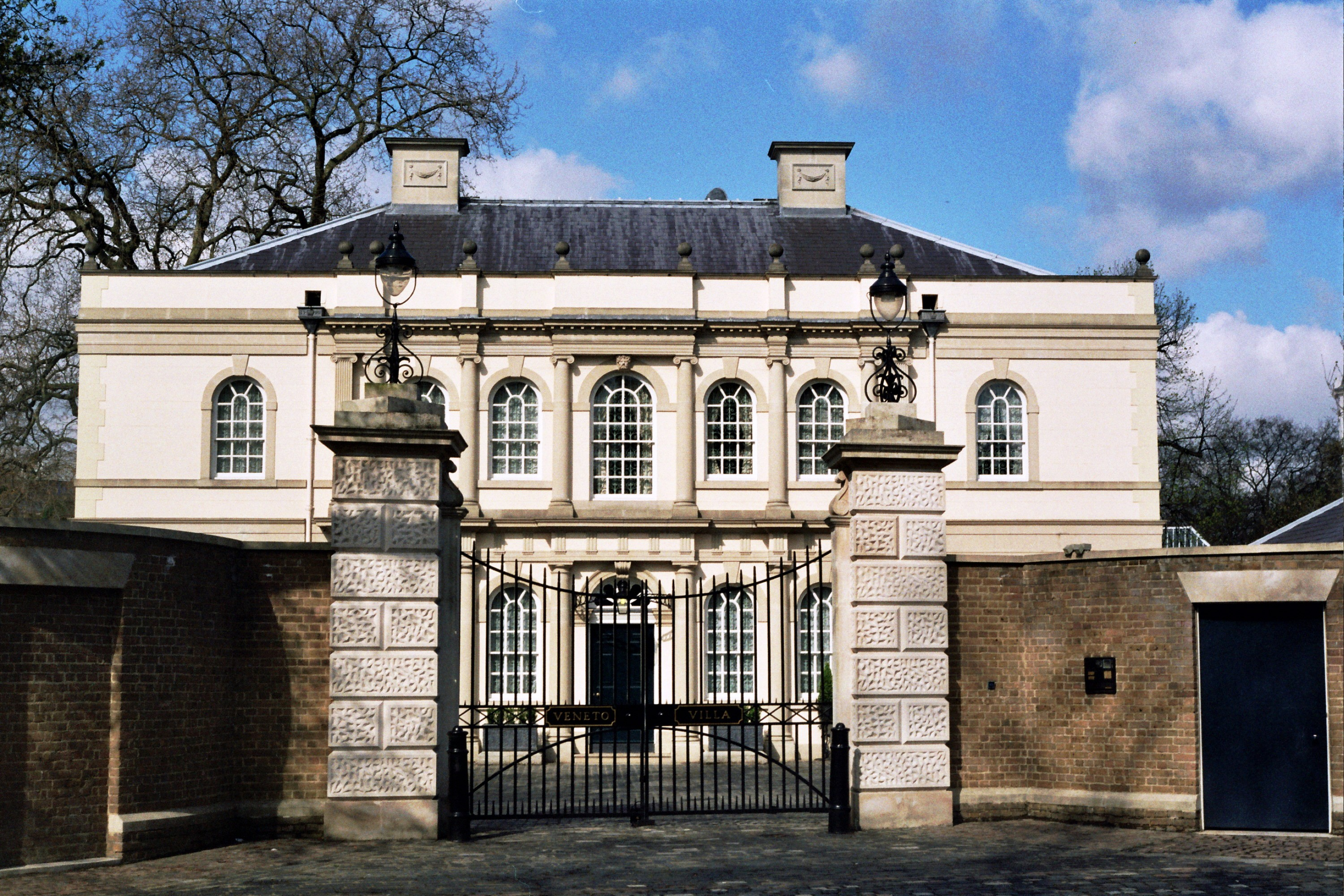
Veneto Villa, Regent's Park

The site was formerly occupied by Bedford College. The college merged with the Royal Holloway College and moved to Egham in Surrey to become Royal Holloway, University of London, having previously been based at Hanover Lodge. The creator of the Regent's Park, the 19th-century architect John Nash, had intended to construct 48 villas in the park, but only eight were eventually constructed before 1826 when work on his scheme was stopped by the government. In 1987 the Regent Park's Crown Estate Commissioners commissioned the Neo-Classical English architect Quinlan Terry to build six detached villas that echoed the style of Nash. Terry said in a 2002 interview that the Crown Estate had told him to "step into Nash's shoes and carry on walking". Prior to the villas' construction Terry had said also that it was a "glorious opportunity to tidy up a superb site". The villas were constructed from the late 1980s to 2002.

Several of the villas were purchased by foreign buyers upon completion, with some having to be expanded to include extra staff accommodation.

Terry described the construction of the villas as "a dream commission" in a 2002 interview given to mark the end of construction of the villas. Terry also said that "There were times when I thought we'd never finish them all" and that "It would have been a disaster if someone had decided to abandon the last three and given them to modernists to design." The first three villas sold for up to £9 million, with the Gothick villa selling for £6.5 million in 1994.

Three of the villas were built by the property developers Ian and Richard Livingstone in the 1990s.

== Design ==
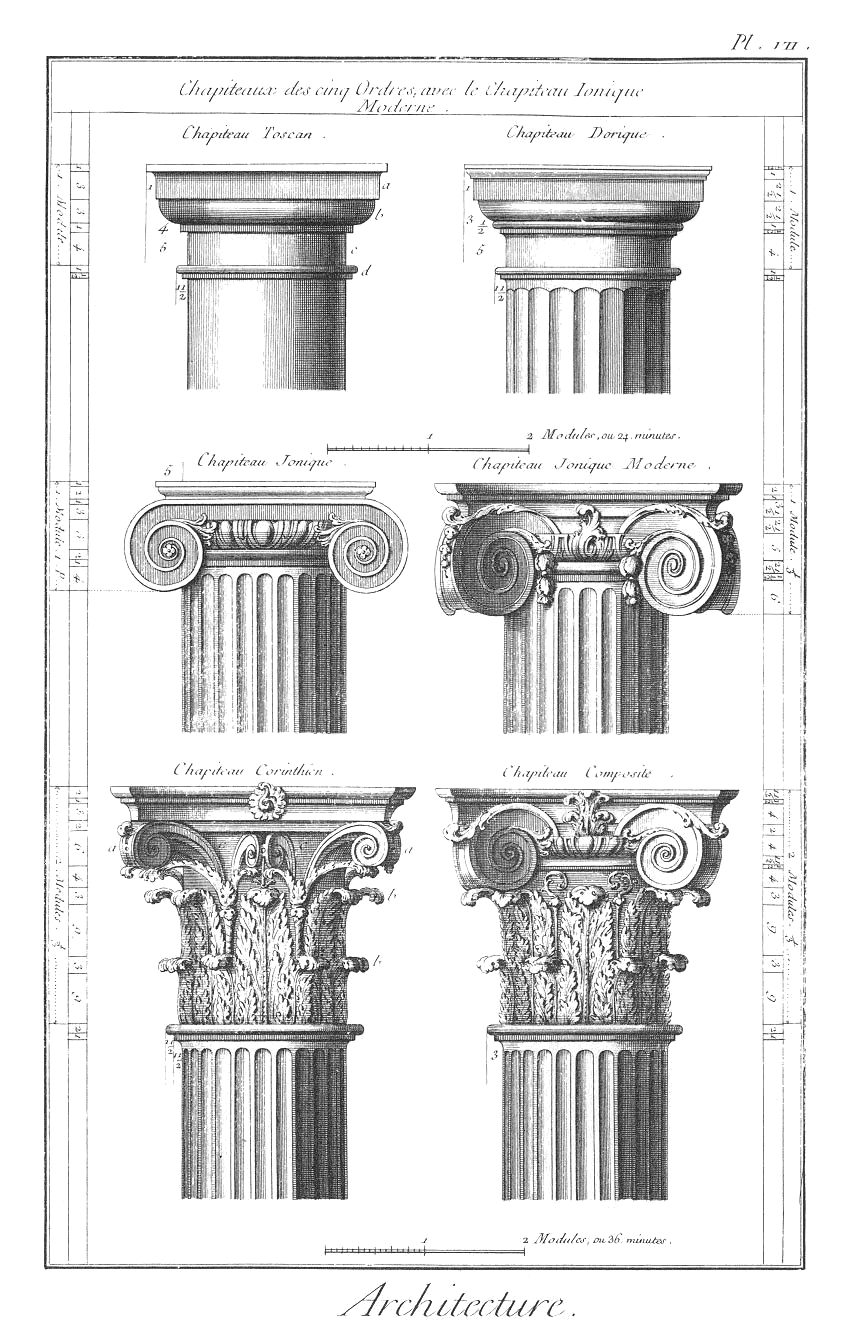
Tuscan, Doric, Ionic, Corinthian and Composite columns. 1761.

The villas were critiqued by Kenneth Allinson and Victoria Thornton in their Guide to London's Contemporary Architecture. Allinson and Thornton felt that the location of the villas was integral to understanding their style, feeling that they made "little sense" outside of Nash's original scheme for building in the park and that they could also be likened to properties on the Bishop's Avenue where "a less erudite version of the Neo-classical detached villa has manifest itself". Of their style Allinson and Thornton wrote that

But these villas are more Palladian than the informal Tuscan villa rustica format preferred by Nash at Park Village. They are also without leanings toward the picturesque of cottages ornés. Instead, their symmetrical playfulness is of a very serious nature. The outer form wears a smile, but it is all terrible self-conscious and well mannered. Naughty, in fact.

The design of the Corinthian Villa was influenced by the work of the 17th-century Italian baroque architect Francesco Borromini, and features the first 'serpentine triple-curved facade' in English architectural history.

The design of the Gothick Villa is based on Andrea Palladio's mid 16th-century Villa Saraceno, with the extra 'k' in its name indicating that the villa's style is not purely derived from Gothic architecture. The internal design of the Gothick Villa features details inspired by Combermere Abbey in Cheshire, and Longner Hall in Shropshire.

== Gallery ==
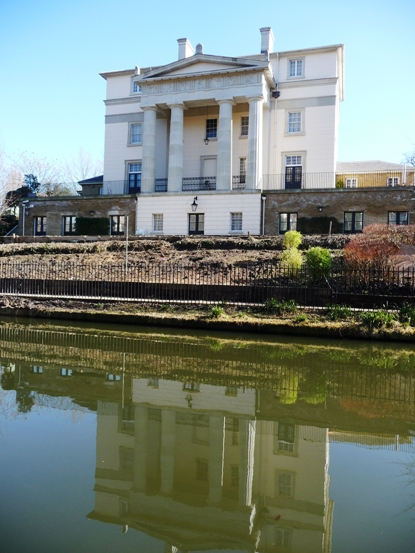

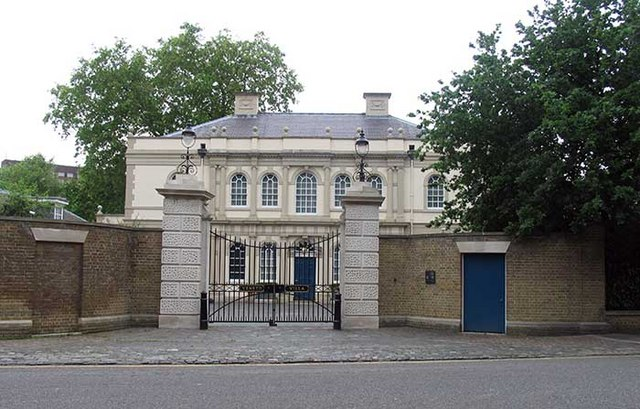

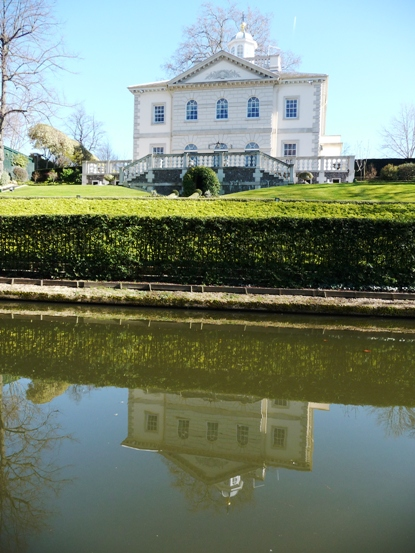

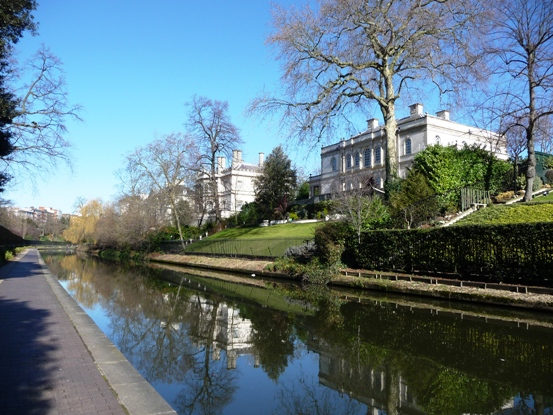

== Sources ==
- Stourton, James (2012). Great Houses of London. London: Frances Lincoln. ISBN 978-0-7112-3366-9.
