= Wadhurst railway station =

Railway station in East Sussex, England

Coordinates: 51.073°N 0.313°E

Wadhurst
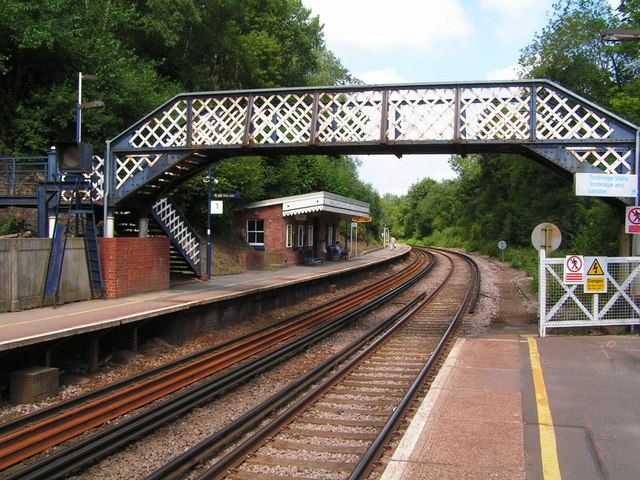
- The station in 2006

General information
- Location: Wadhurst, Wealden; England
- Grid reference: TQ621329
- Owner: Network Rail
- Manager: Southeastern
- Platforms: 2

Other information
- Station code: WAD
- Classification: DfT category D

History
- Opened: 1851

Passengers
- 2020/21: ▼71,958
- 2021/22: ▲0.242 million
- 2022/23: ▲0.287 million
- 2023/24: ▲0.322 million
- 2024/25: ▲0.359 million
Location
Notes
- Passenger statistics from the Office of Rail and Road

Wadhurst railway station is on the Hastings line in the south of England and serves the town of Wadhurst, East Sussex. It is 39 miles 23 chains (63.2 km) down the line from London Charing Cross. The station and all trains serving it are operated by Southeastern.

Designed by the architect William Tress, the station was opened in 1851 by the South Eastern Railway. Originally there were sidings and a goods shed, but these have been replaced with a car park.

Unusually, the station features a private entrance to nearby Faircrouch, a large Grade II listed house around 220 yards from the westbound platform.

In 2000 the station buildings and footbridge were given Grade II listed status.

== Services ==
All services at Wadhurst are operated by Southeastern using Class 375 EMUs.

The typical off-peak service in trains per hour is:

- 2 tph to London Charing Cross
- 2 tph to Hastings (1 semi-fast, 1 stopping)

Additional services, including trains to and from and London Cannon Street and Ore call at the station in the peak hours.

Preceding station	National Rail	Following station
Frant	Southeastern Hastings Line	Stonegate

== Connections ==
Stagecoach South East route 1066 serves the station.
