= Etchingham railway station =

Railway station in East Sussex, England

Coordinates: 51.011°N 0.442°E

Etchingham
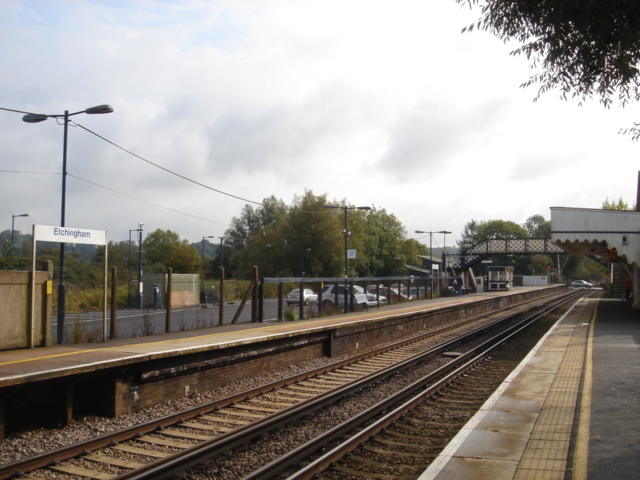
- Etchingham station in 2007

General information
- Location: Etchingham, Rother, East Sussex; England
- Grid reference: TQ714263
- Manager: Southeastern
- Platforms: 2

Other information
- Station code: ETC
- Classification: DfT category E

Key dates
- 1851: Opened

Passengers
- 2020/21: ▼43,894
- 2021/22: ▲0.137 million
- 2022/23: ▲0.167 million
- 2023/24: ▲0.187 million
- 2024/25: ▲0.209 million
Location
Notes
- Passenger statistics from the Office of Rail and Road

Etchingham railway station is on the Hastings line in the south of England and serves the village of Etchingham, East Sussex. It is 47 miles 34 chains (76.3 km) down the line from London Charing Cross. The station and all trains serving it are operated by Southeastern.

== Facilities ==
Etchingham station has two platforms linked by a footbridge (with steps on both sides) and a station building housing the ticket office and waiting room.

Train information is provided in the form of automated announcements, LED displays and timetable posters. Disabled passengers may cross between the platforms using the level crossing to the south of the station.

Etchingham is in a penalty fare area and when the ticket office is closed passengers should purchase a ticket before boarding a train.

== Services ==
All services at Etchingham are operated by Southeastern using Class 375 EMUs.

The typical off-peak service in trains per hour is:

- 1 tph to London Charing Cross
- 1 tph to Hastings

Additional services, including trains to and from and London Cannon Street and Ore call at the station in the peak hours.

Preceding station	National Rail	Following station
Stonegate	Southeastern Hastings Line	Robertsbridge

== Stationmaster's House ==
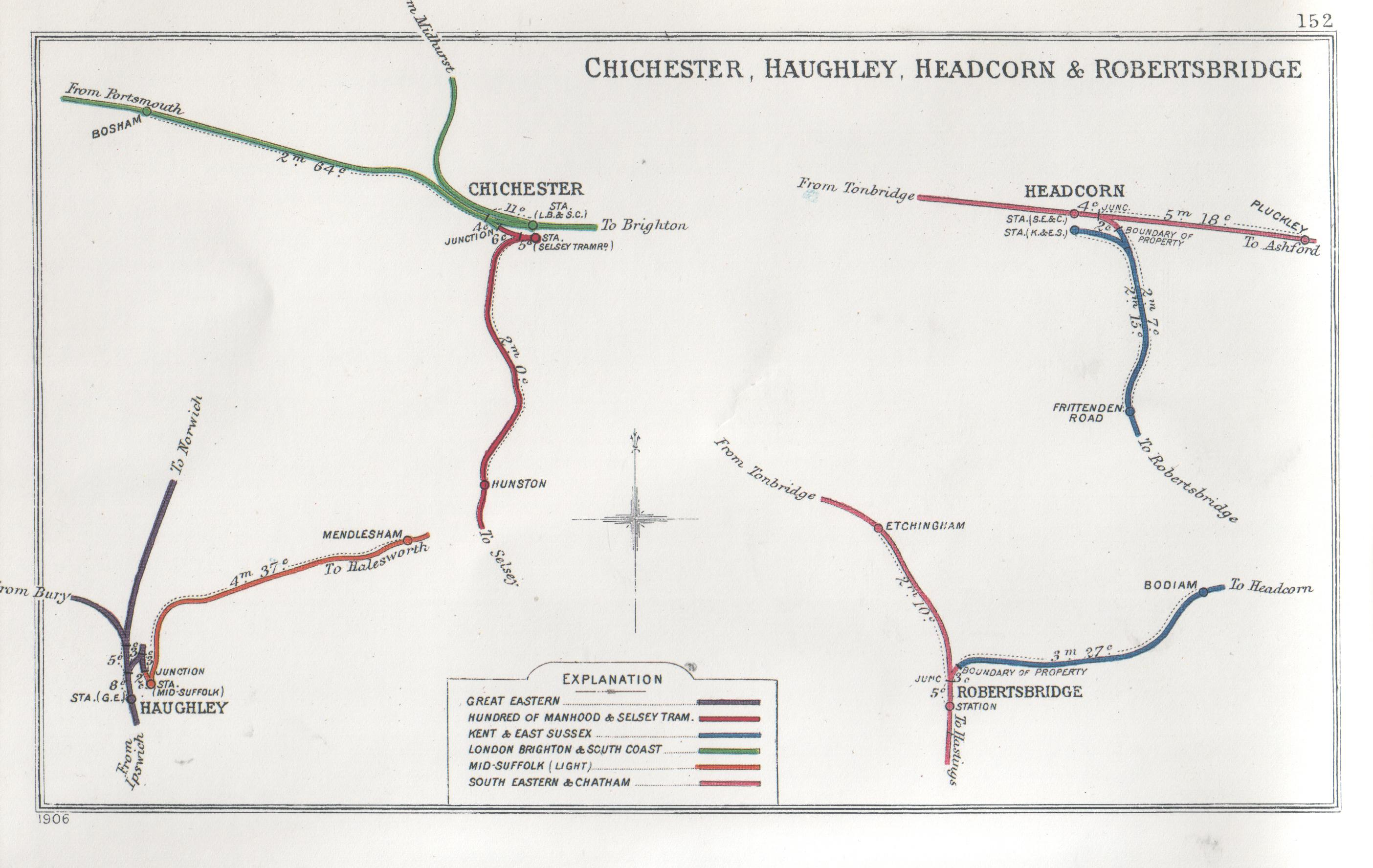
A 1906 Railway Clearing House map of lines around Etchingham railway station

The station was built on the site of the former Etchingham Castle. The current building dates from 1851, when both the station and the first section of the Hastings line opened, and incorporates sandstone blocks taken from a manor house which stood on the site. The L-Shaped structure, designed by architect William Tress incorporated a two-storey-high house for the Station Master and was a variation of the design utilised up the line at Frant.

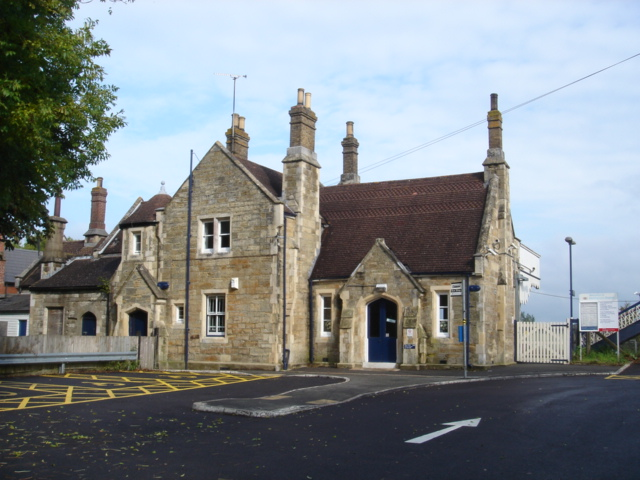
The station building in 2007

The building was listed in 1987 but was neglected over the next two decades and fell into disrepair. In 2007, the building was identified as having potential for a new business and after 3 years of renovation and fundraising by the de Etchingham CIC, a Bistro was opened in April 2010. The renovation won a National Railway Heritage Award.

The "Bistro@the station" is still open, occupying both storeys of the north wing of the building.
