= Bulverhythe railway station =

Disused railway station in East Sussex, England

Coordinates: 50.851640°N 0.533769°E

St Leonards Bulverhythe

General information
- Location: East Bulverhythe, West St Leonards, Hastings, East Sussex; England
- Grid reference: TQ784088
- Platforms: ?

Other information
- Status: Disused

History
- Original company: Brighton, Lewes and Hastings Railway

Key dates
- 27 June 1846: Opened
- 7 November 1846: Closed
Location

Bulverhythe (also known as St Leonards Bulverhythe) was a temporary railway station on the Brighton Lewes and Hastings Railway in Bulverhythe, now part of Hastings, East Sussex.

== History ==
The independent Brighton, Lewes & Hastings Railway was incorporated in 1844 to construct a 32 1/2-mile (52.3 km) line from Brighton to Bulverhythe, 2 3/4 miles (4.4 km) from Hastings. A temporary terminus named "Bulverhythe" was opened on 27 June 1846 on a site near the Bull Inn on the modern day A259 Bexhill Road pending the construction of a bridge over the River Asten. The station remained open for just under six months, before the line was extended to a permanent station at St Leonards West Marina in November 1846. The Brighton, Lewes & Hastings Railway was taken over by the London, Brighton and South Coast Railway in 1847.

Preceding station	Historical railways	Following station
Bexhill	Brighton, Lewes & Hastings Railway; East Coastway Line	Terminus

== Present day ==
St Leonards West Marina station closed in 1967 and the only remaining station in the West St Leonards area is West St Leonards.
