= Frant railway station =

Railway station in East Sussex, England

Coordinates: 51°06′14.5″N 0°17′40″E

Frant
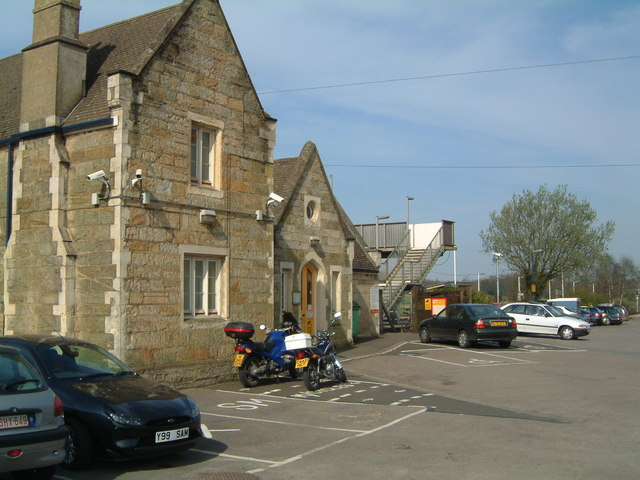
- The station building in 2002

General information
- Location: Bells Yew Green, Frant, Wealden, East Sussex; England
- Grid reference: TQ607363
- Manager: Southeastern
- Platforms: 2

Other information
- Station code: FRT
- Classification: DfT category E

Key dates
- 1851: Opened

Passengers
- 2020/21: ▼25,556
- 2021/22: ▲71,466
- 2022/23: ▲90,644
- 2023/24: ▲0.103 million
- 2024/25: ▲0.113 million
Location
Notes
- Passenger statistics from the Office of Rail and Road

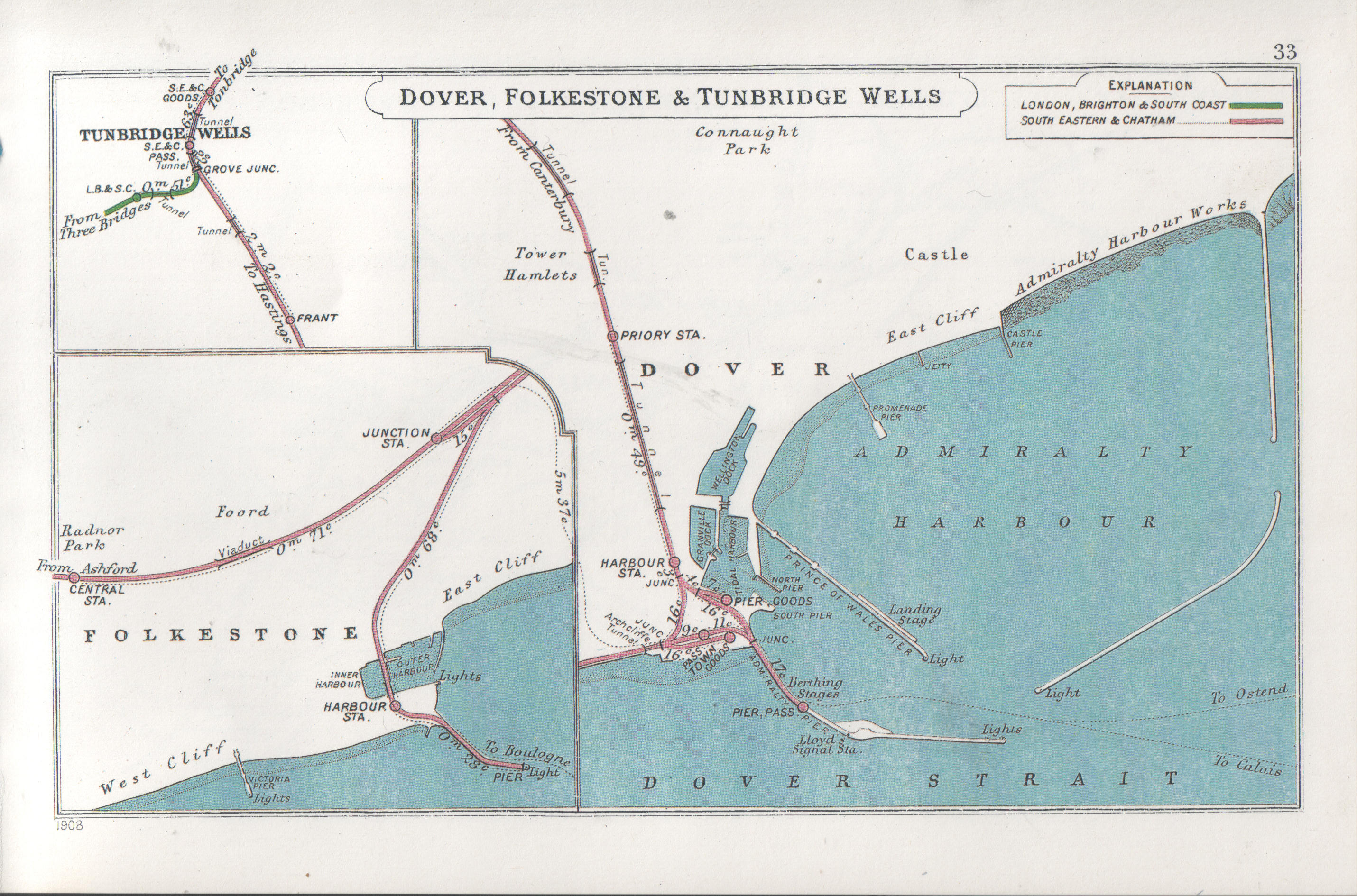
A 1908 Railway Clearing House map of lines around Frant railway station (upper left, in pink)

Frant railway station is on the Hastings line in East Sussex, England, and serves the civil parish of Frant (although the station is actually located some 1.2 mi (2 km) from the village of that name, in the hamlet of Bells Yew Green). It is 36 miles 53 chains (59.0 km) down the line from London Charing Cross. The station and all trains serving it are operated by Southeastern.

It is also the nearest station to the Kentish village of Lamberhurst, 4.3 mi (7 km) away: an infrequent bus service (four to five journeys each way on Mondays to Saturdays) links Frant station with Lamberhurst.

== History ==
The station was opened by the South Eastern Railway (SER) at the same time as the route, in 1851, and the original station building, which is situated on the Down (eastern) side of the line, remains in use. Designed by the company's architect, William Tress, and built of local ragstone in a Gothic lodge style, with a canopy added in 1905, it has been a Grade II listed building since 1982. From the 1960s until 1986, the station was served only at peak times on week days. However, since 1986, when the line was electrified, it has been served seven days a week.

== Services ==
All services at Frant are operated by Southeastern using Class 375 EMUs.

The typical off-peak service in trains per hour is:

- 1 tph to London Charing Cross
- 1 tph to Hastings

Additional services, including trains to and from and London Cannon Street and Ore call at the station in the peak hours.

Preceding station	National Rail	Following station
Tunbridge Wells	Southeastern Hastings Line	Wadhurst
