= Bulverhythe =

Suburb of Hastings, East Sussex, England

Coordinates: 50.850°N 0.523°E

Bulverhythe (or West St Leonards)
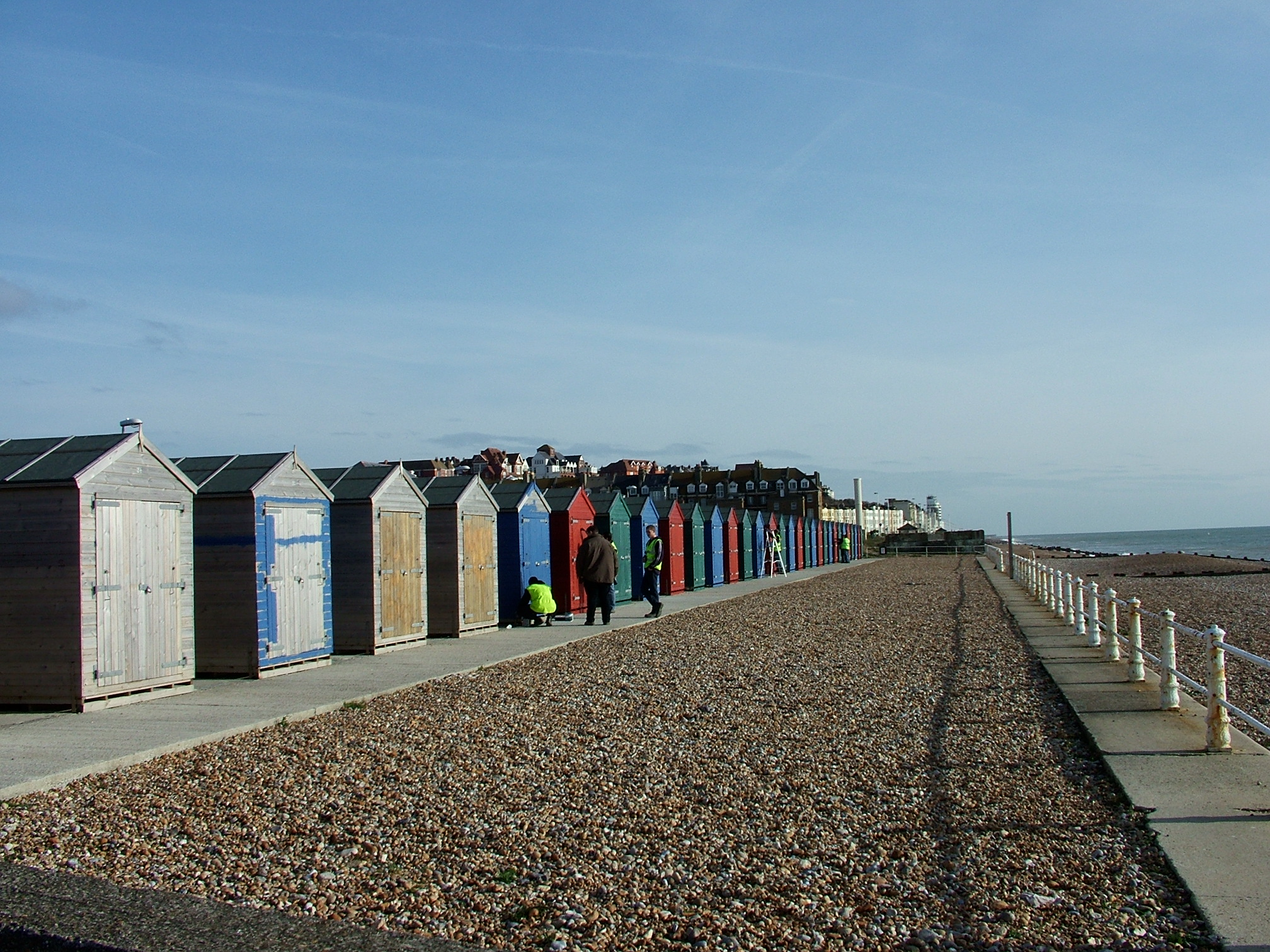
- West St Leonards
- District: Hastings
- Shire county: East Sussex
- Region: South East
- Country: England
- Sovereign state: United Kingdom
- Post town: ST. LEONARDS-ON-SEA
- Postcode district: TN38
- Dialling code: 01424
- Police: Sussex
- Fire: East Sussex
- Ambulance: South East Coast

Bulverhythe, also known as West St Leonards and Bo Peep, is a suburb of Hastings, East Sussex, England with its Esplanade and 15 ft thick sea wall. Bulverhythe is translated as "Burghers' landing place". It used to be under a small headland called Gallows Head, which was washed away by flooding. The suburbs of Filsham, West Marina and Harley Shute are nearby.

== Bulverhythe village ==
Bulverhythe village is located to the southwest of the area. The ancient village had a small harbour and pier, and is where the remains of the Amsterdam can be seen.

The village was once in the confederation of the Cinque Ports, under the 'Limb' of Hastings. It helped supply one ship together with Petit Ihamme (originally Pyppels Ham and now the village of Pebsham).

== Filsham Manor ==
Filsham Manor was a house on Harley Shute Road dating back to Saxon times. The house was rebuilt in 1682, and part of this remains today.

== Gardens ==
In the east of the area lie West Marina Gardens which were designed by James Burton and are in between the West St Leonards and Burton's town of St Leonards. The land was purchased in 1886 and laid out as a pleasure garden by 1891. The site is well-used and includes a bowls green, putting course and formal gardens. It is at the western extreme of the frontline garden displays. Decorative lighting has recently been installed.

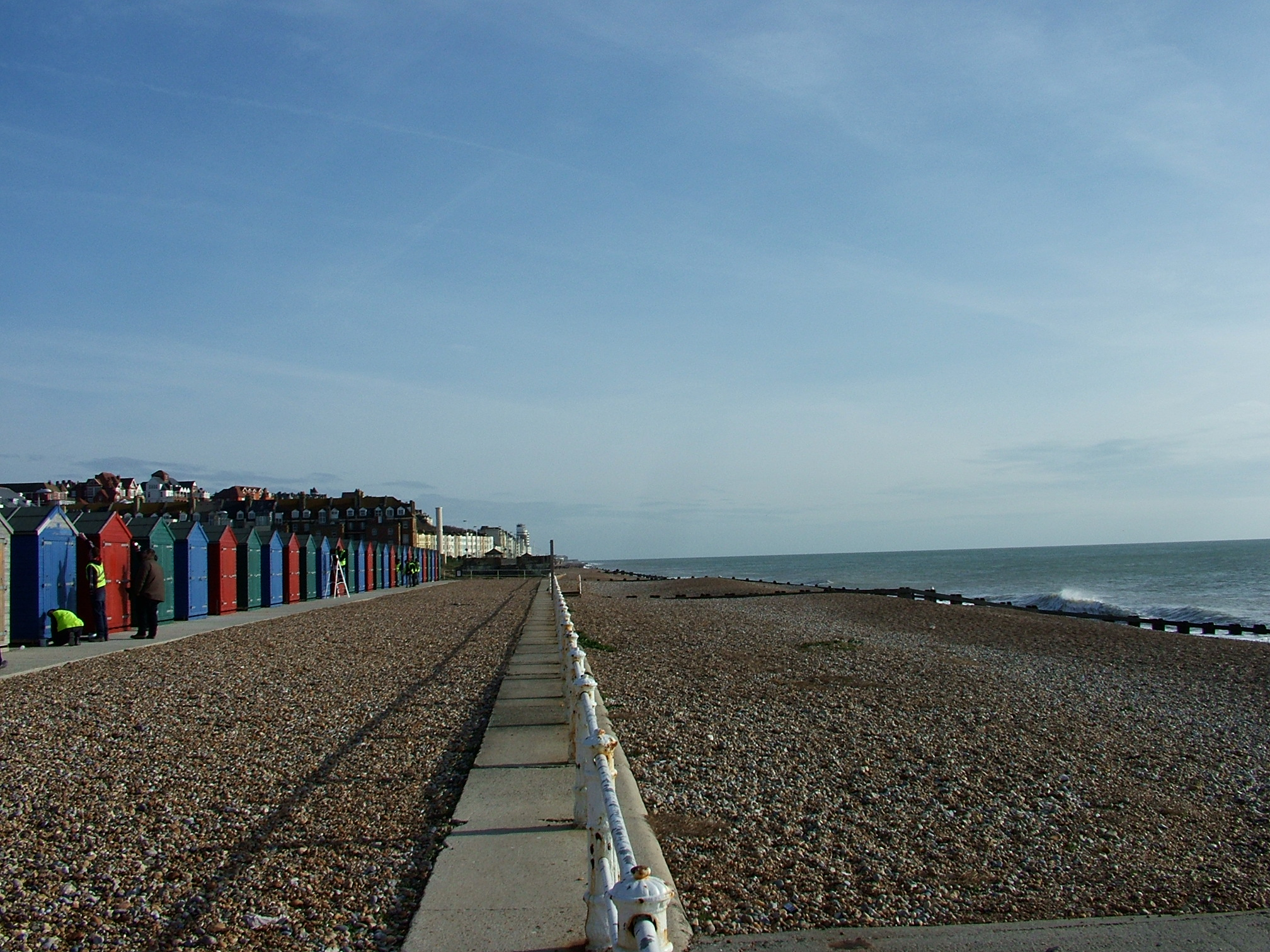
Multicoloured beach huts

== Bulverhythe Salts ==
The Bulverhythe Salts was a site of a racecourse that was moved to the Saxon shoreway.

== Shipwrecks ==
In January 1921 a British tug was towing a German submarine in the English Channel when it broke adrift in a gale and was washed ashore at Bulverhythe. The U-boat was of a smaller type than the other that came ashore at Hastings in April 1919. The event was reported in the Hastings Observer with the headline: "Another Submarine Visitor!"

Three tugs tried to refloat the submarine without success and after the hull was badly damaged by stormy seas, it was eventually dismantled.

Another boat that washed up was the Dutch ship Amsterdam that set sail to Java but ended up running aground on the sandy strip in 1749. The remains can still be seen today at very low tide, just opposite the footbridge over the railway line at Bulverhythe.

== Transportation ==
=== Railways ===
Bulverhythe was only served by a temporary station until the line extended to West Marina. The line was constructed by the Brighton, Lewes and Hastings Railway and when the South Eastern Railway line came from London and tunnelled through to St Leonards, Hastings and the Marshlink Line, a feud started between the companies. The junction for the two routes, called Bo-Peep junction, was named after a nearby public house, which in turn came from the activities of smugglers and excise men. West Marina is now closed and, although both platforms and lights still remain, West St Leonards station is the only remaining station in this area.
