= Stonegate railway station =

Railway station in East Sussex, England

Stonegate
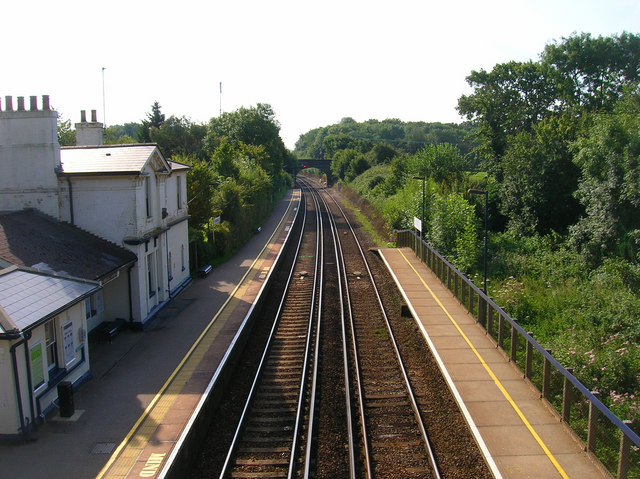
- The station in 2007

General information
- Location: Between Witherenden Hill and Stonegate in the parish of Ticehurst, Rother; England
- Coordinates: 51.020°N 0.364°E
- Grid reference: TQ658271
- Manager: Southeastern
- Platforms: 2

Other information
- Station code: SOG
- Classification: DfT category E

History
- Original company: South Eastern Railway
- Pre-grouping: South Eastern and Chatham Railway
- Post-grouping: Southern Railway

Key dates
- 1 September 1851: Opened as Witherenden
- December 1851: Renamed Ticehurst Road
- 16 June 1947: Renamed Stonegate

Passengers
- 2020/21: ▼29,224
- 2021/22: ▲93,064
- 2022/23: ▲0.118 million
- 2023/24: 0.118 million
- 2024/25: ▲0.124 million
Location
Notes
- Passenger statistics from the Office of Rail and Road

Stonegate railway station (not to be confused with Stone Crossing) is on the Hastings line in the south of England. It is located between Witherenden Hill and Stonegate in the parish of Ticehurst, East Sussex. It is located 43 miles 66 chains (70.5 km) down the line from London Charing Cross . The station and all trains serving it are operated by Southeastern.

== Services ==
All services at Stonegate are operated by Southeastern using Class 375 EMUs.

The typical off-peak service in trains per hour is:

- 1 tph to London Charing Cross
- 1 tph to Hastings

A single peak hours train each way additionally serves London Cannon Street.

Preceding station	National Rail	Following station
Wadhurst	Southeastern Hastings Line	Etchingham

== History ==
The South Eastern Railway route between Tunbridge Wells and Hastings was authorised in 1846 (9 & 10 Vict. c. lxiv), and opened in stages: the section between Tunbridge Wells and Robertsbridge was opened on 1 September 1851. The station opened the same day named Witherenden (the name of a nearby hamlet), but was renamed in December the same year to Ticehurst Road. It became Stonegate (after a village about 1 mile away) on 16 June 1947.

On 13 April 2014, it emerged that a BlackRock fund manager travelling from the station paid £42,550 in an out of court settlement for over five years of dodging season ticket fares to London by using an unvalidated Oyster card and avoiding ticket inspectors. It is believed to have been the highest fare dodge known in Britain.
