= Glyne Gap Halt railway station =

Disused railway station in East Sussex, England

Coordinates: 50.844°N 0.505°E

Glyne Gap Halt

General information
- Location: Rother, East Sussex; England
- Grid reference: TQ765079
- Platforms: 2

Other information
- Status: Disused

History
- Pre-grouping: London, Brighton and South Coast Railway

Key dates
- 11 Sep 1905: Opened
- 1 Oct 1915: Closed
Location

Glyne Gap Halt was a railway station located in East Sussex between Bexhill and Hastings. It was opened on 11 September 1905 by the London, Brighton and South Coast Railway (LBSCR), and closed ten years later.

== See also ==
- List of closed railway stations in Britain

== Bibliography ==
- Butt, R. V. J. (October 1995). The Directory of Railway Stations: details every public and private passenger station, halt, platform and stopping place, past and present (1st ed.). Sparkford: Patrick Stephens Ltd. ISBN 978-1-85260-508-7. OCLC 60251199. OL 11956311M.

Preceding station	Disused railways	Following station
Bexhill; Line open, station open	London, Brighton and South Coast Railway	St Leonards West Marina; Line open, station closed
