= St Leonards Warrior Square railway station =

Railway station in East Sussex, England

Coordinates: 50.856°N 0.561°E

St Leonards Warrior Square
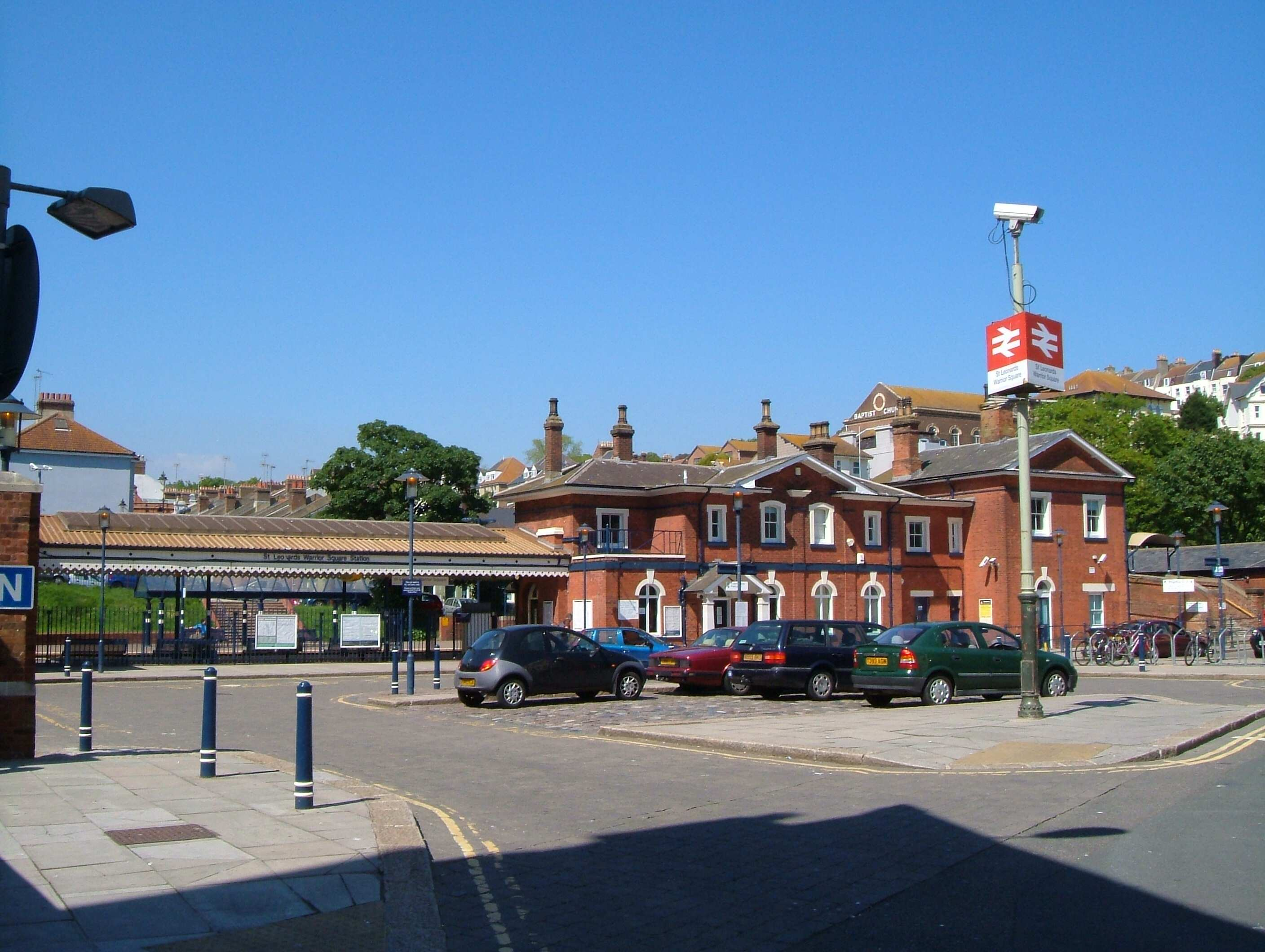
- The station in 2007

General information
- Location: St Leonards-on-Sea, Hastings, East Sussex; England
- Grid reference: TQ803093
- Manager: Southeastern
- Platforms: 2

Other information
- Station code: SLQ
- Classification: DfT category D

Key dates
- 13 February 1851: Opened as St Leonards
- 5 December 1870: Renamed St Leonards Warrior Square
- 1 January 1917: Closed
- 1 January 1919: Reopened

Passengers
- 2020/21: ▼0.285 million
- Interchange: ▼57,720
- 2021/22: ▲0.711 million
- Interchange: ▲0.128 million
- 2022/23: ▲0.804 million
- Interchange: ▲0.151 million
- 2023/24: ▲0.880 million
- Interchange: 0.151 million
- 2024/25: ▲1.001 million
- Interchange: ▲0.156 million
Location
Notes
- Passenger statistics from the Office of Rail and Road

St Leonards Warrior Square railway station is on the Hastings line in the south of England and is one of four stations that serve Hastings, East Sussex. It is 61 miles 55 chains (99.3 km) down the line from London Charing Cross. The station is operated by Southeastern but is also served by trains operated by Southern.

== History ==
The station building and house, still in existence today, were constructed in 1851 by the South Eastern Railway (SER). The competing London, Brighton and South Coast Railway (LBSCR) trains were not allowed to stop here until December 1870. The two companies maintained separate booking offices until 1923 when they both became part of the Southern Railway. The station is constructed in a narrow valley with higher ground east and west, so that trains arrive and depart either end of the platform through tunnels. This restricts the number of carriages which have direct access to the platform to 8 cars.

== Services ==
Services at St Leonards Warrior Square are operated by Southern and Southeastern.

The typical off-peak service in trains per hour is:

=== Southern ===
- 1 tph to London Victoria via Gatwick Airport
- 1 tph to Brighton (semi-fast)
- 1 tph to Eastbourne (stopping)
- 2 tph to Hastings of which 1 continue to Ore
- 1 tph to Ashford International

During the peak hours and on Saturdays, the station is also served by an additional hourly semi-fast service between Brighton and Ore.

Southern services at St Leonards Warrior Square are operated using Class 377 EMUs and Class 171 DMUs.

=== Southeastern ===
- 2 tph to London Charing Cross via Tonbridge (1 semi-fast, 1 stopping)
- 2 tph to Hastings

Southeastern also operate a number of peak hour services to London Cannon Street and Ore.

Southeastern services at St Leonards Warrior Square are operated using Class 375 EMUs.

Preceding station	National Rail	Following station
Bexhill	Southern East Coastway Line	Hastings
West St Leonards or Battle	Southeastern Hastings Line	Hastings
	Historical railways	
St Leonards; West Marina	London, Brighton and South Coast Railway East Coastway Line	Hastings
