= West St Leonards railway station =

Railway station in East Sussex, England

Coordinates: 50.853°N 0.540°E

West St Leonards
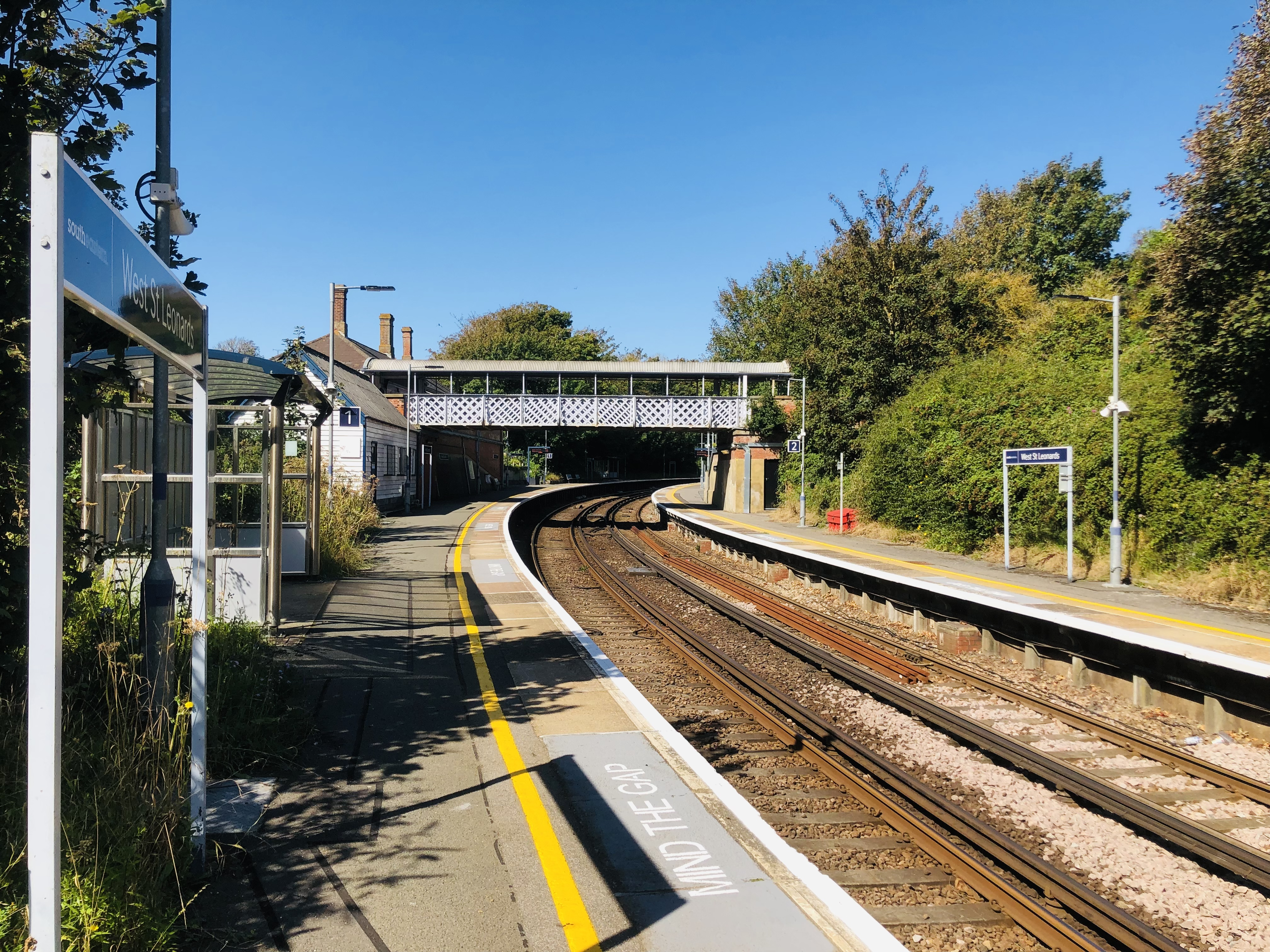
- The platforms at West St Leonards, looking north

General information
- Location: Bulverhythe, Hastings, East Sussex; England
- Grid reference: TQ788090
- Manager: Southeastern
- Platforms: 2

Other information
- Station code: WLD
- Classification: DfT category E

Key dates
- 1887: Station opens

Passengers
- 2020/21: ▼34,536
- 2021/22: ▲0.102 million
- 2022/23: ▲0.113 million
- 2023/24: ▲0.128 million
- 2024/25: ▲0.138 million
Location
Notes
- Passenger statistics from the Office of Rail and Road

West St Leonards railway station is on the Hastings line in the south of England and is one of four stations that serve Hastings and St Leonards, East Sussex. It is 60 miles 59 chains (97.7 km) down the line from London Charing Cross. The station and all trains serving it are operated by Southeastern.

== History ==
West St Leonards station was constructed in 1887.

== Rail layout ==
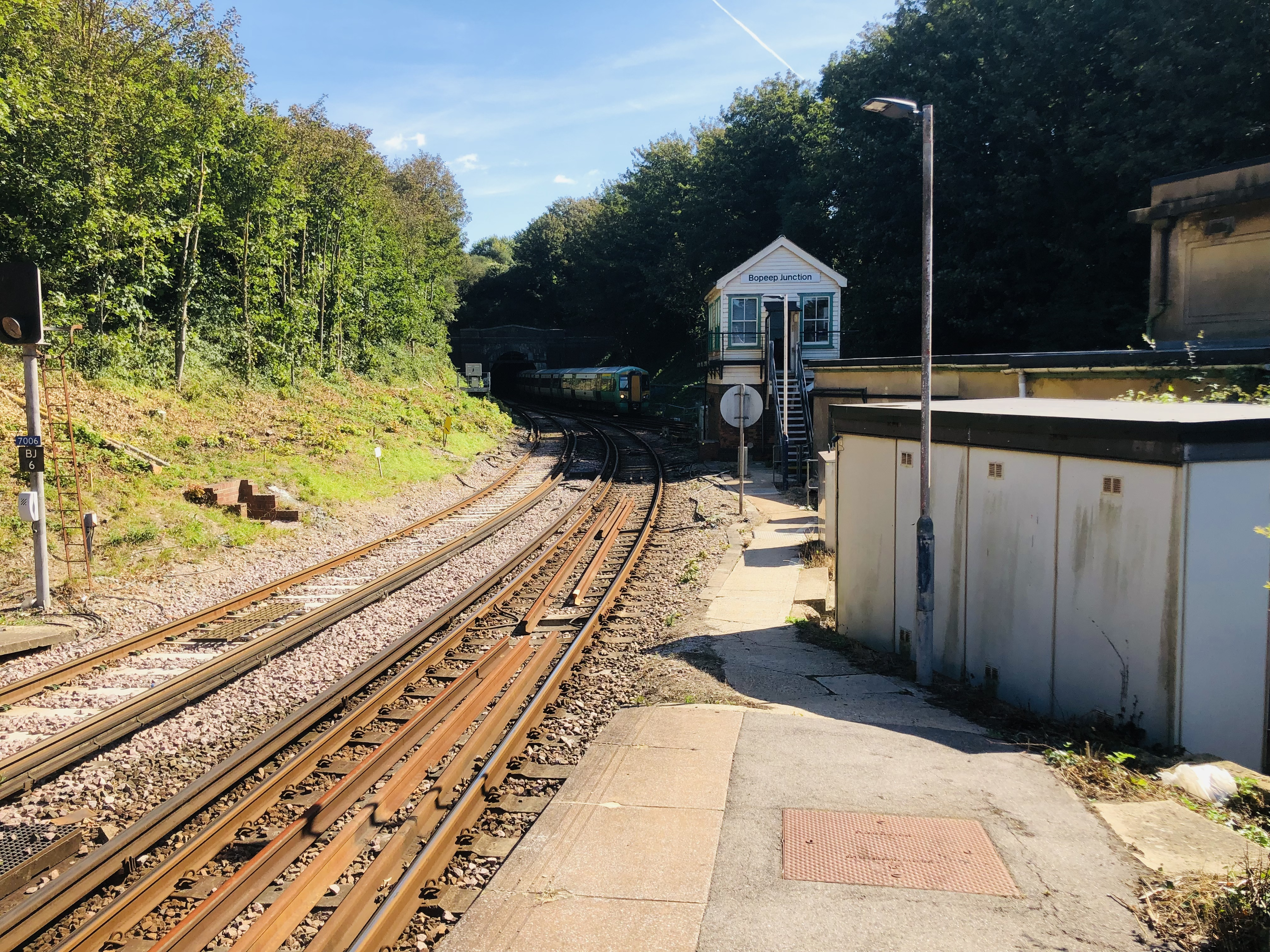
Bopeep Junction and signal box, looking towards Bopeep Tunnel

The Hastings Line (operated by Southeastern) joins the East Coastway Line (operated by Southern) immediately east of West St Leonards, at Bo-Peep junction, just before entering Bo-Peep tunnel. Plans were made for platforms to be built on the East Coastway Line for interchange but Hastings Borough Council decided that there was minimal economic or passenger benefit because interchange was already available at the next station (Warrior Square).

== Services ==
All services at West St Leonards are operated by Southeastern using Class 375 EMUs.

The typical off-peak service in trains per hour is:

- 1 tph to London Charing Cross
- 1 tph to Hastings

Additional services, including trains to and from London Cannon Street and Ore call at the station in the peak hours.

Preceding station	National Rail	Following station
Crowhurst	Southeastern Hastings Line	St Leonards Warrior Square
