= Hastings railway station =

Railway station in East Sussex, England

Hastings
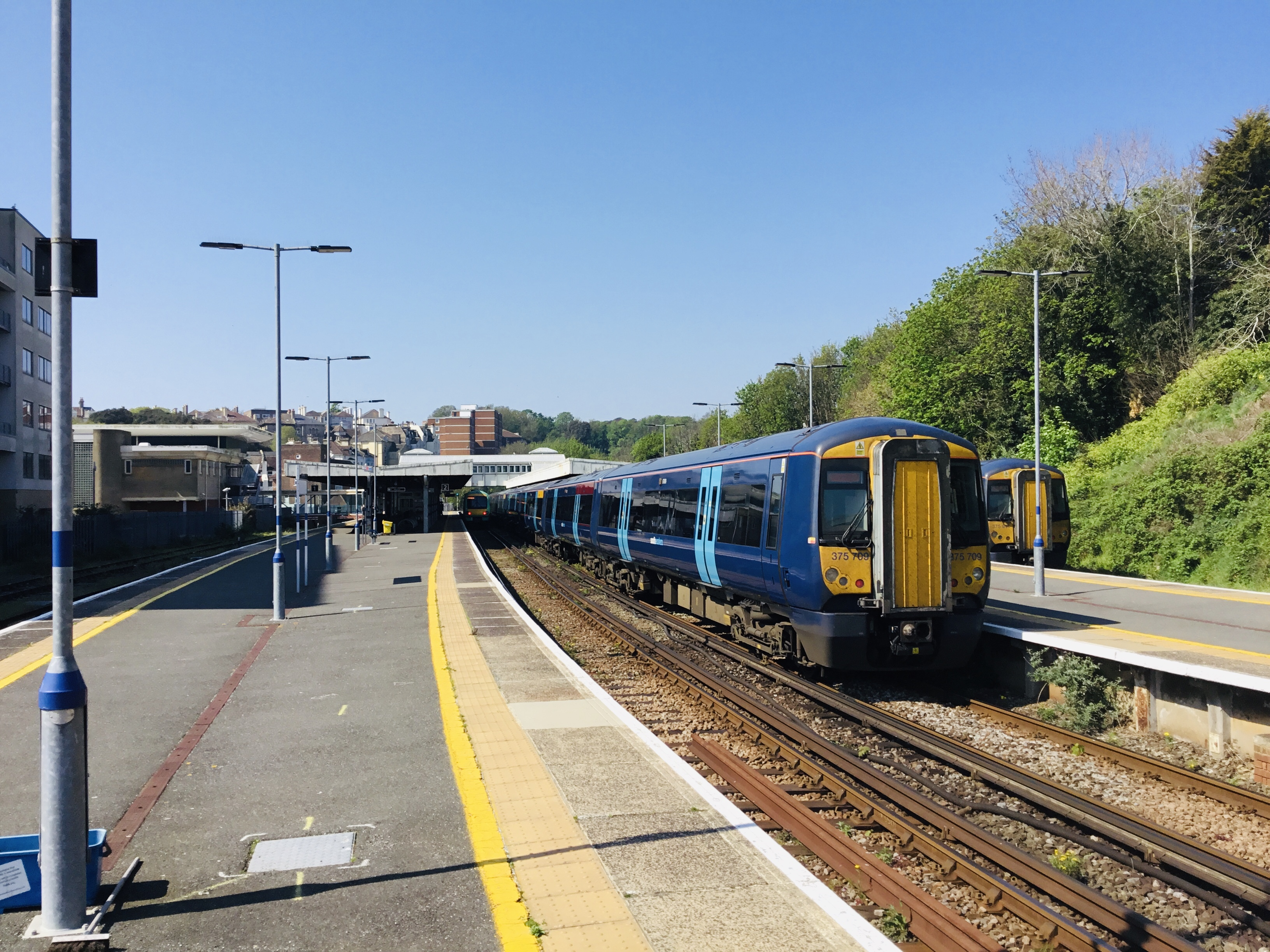
- The platforms at Hastings station, looking west

General information
- Location: Hastings, Borough of Hastings, England
- Coordinates: 50.858°N 0.576°E
- Grid reference: TQ814097
- Manager: Southeastern
- Platforms: 4

Other information
- Station code: HGS
- Classification: DfT category C1

History
- Original company: SER; LBSCR (joint)
- Pre-grouping: SE&CR/LBSCR joint
- Post-grouping: Southern Railway

Key dates
- 13 February 1851: Opened
- 1931: Rebuilt
- 2004: Rebuilt

Passengers
- 2020/21: ▼0.725 million
- Interchange: ▼15,778
- 2021/22: ▲1.691 million
- Interchange: ▲41,519
- 2022/23: ▲1.903 million
- Interchange: ▼35,074
- 2023/24: ▲2.002 million
- Interchange: ▼32,871
- 2024/25: ▲2.169 million
- Interchange: ▲33,339
Location
Notes
- Passenger statistics from the Office of Rail and Road

Hastings is one of four stations that serve the town of Hastings, in East Sussex, England. It is the southern terminus of the Hastings line, a stop on the East Coastway line to Eastbourne and also the Marshlink line to Ashford International. It lies 62 miles 33 chains (100.4 km) from London Charing Cross, via Chelsfield and Battle; and 82 miles 33 chains (132.6 km) from Charing Cross, via Chelsfield and Ashford. The station is managed by Southeastern, which operates services along with Southern.

== History ==
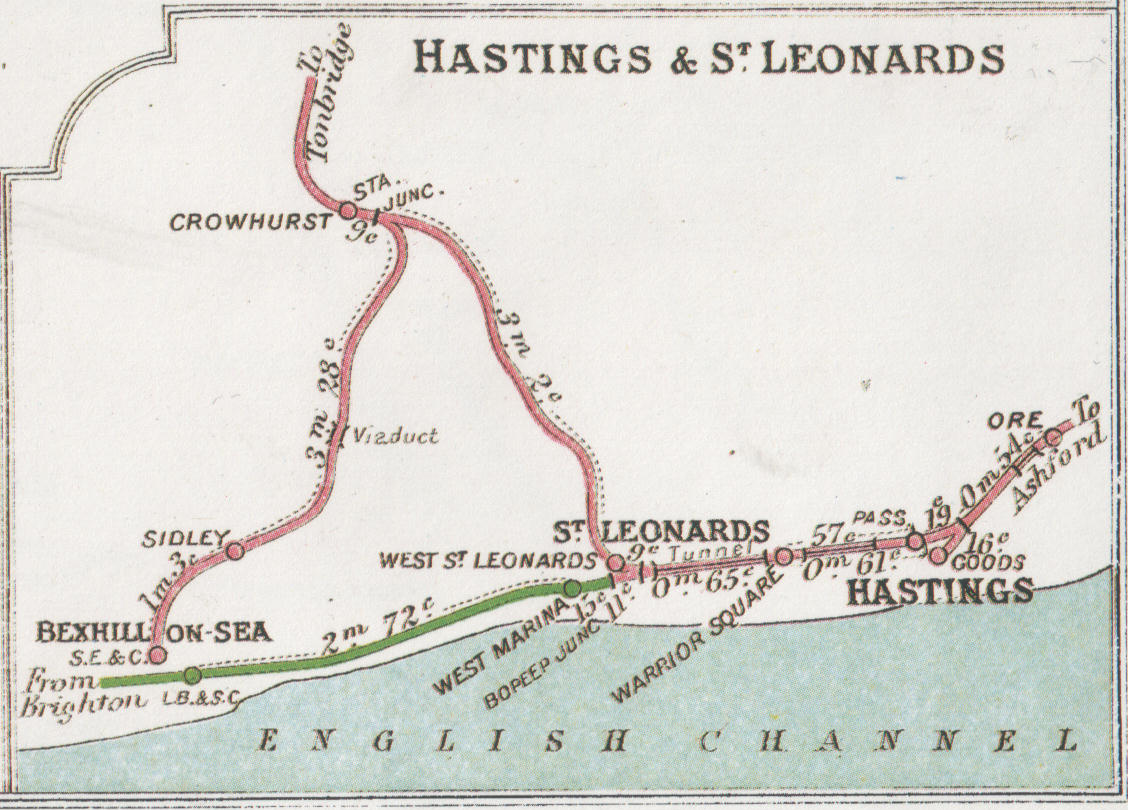
A 1914 Railway Clearing House Junction Diagram showing lines around Hastings

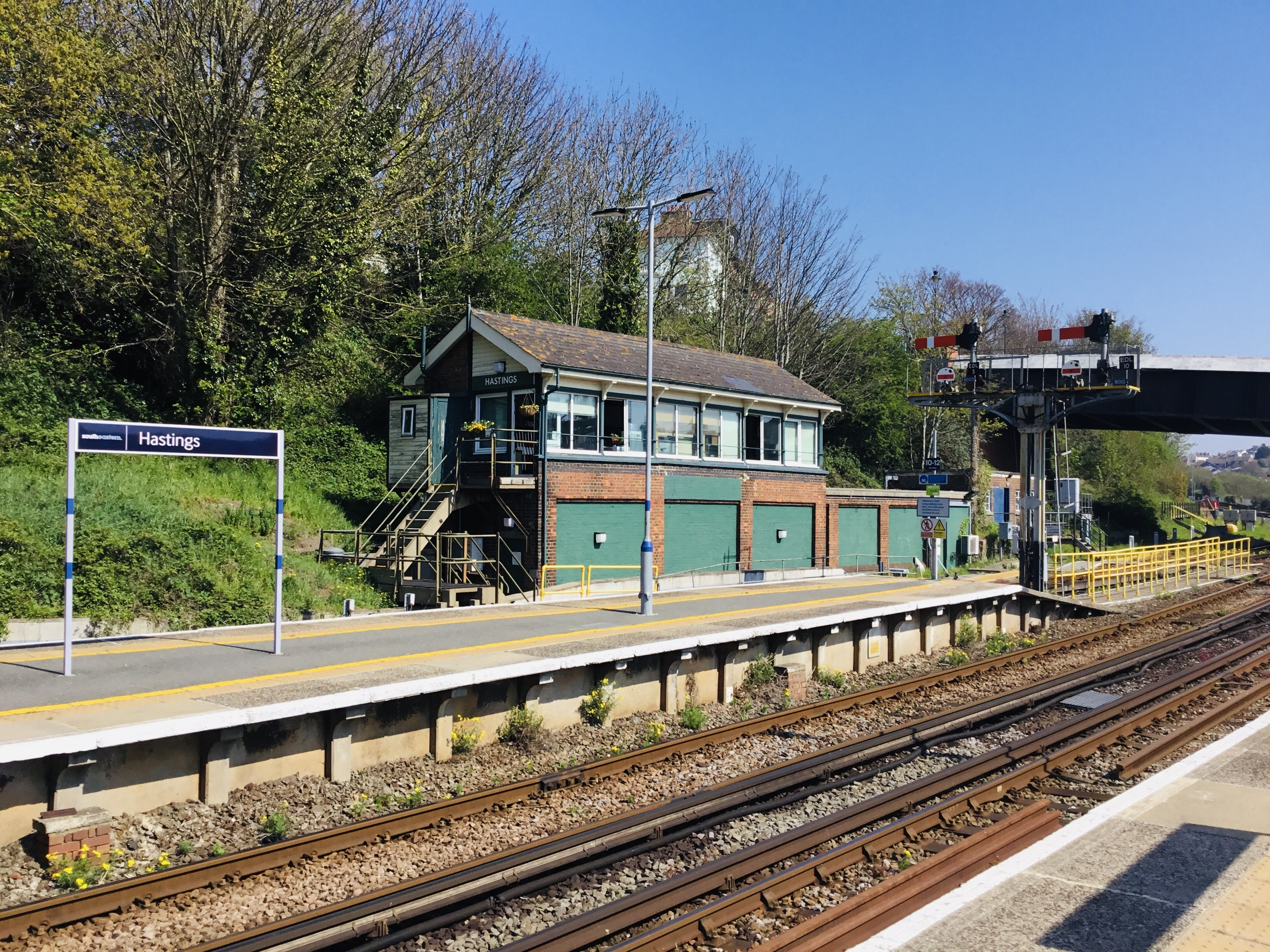
Hastings signal box, with semaphore signals

The station was first proposed by the South Eastern Railway (SER) on 9 October 1835, as the terminus for a railway from Tunbridge Wells via Rye. These plans were developed during 1843, as the SER planned the most practical route to the town through what would be difficult terrain. In the meantime, the Parliamentary Select Committee had supported a scheme by the Brighton, Lewes & Hastings Railway (BLHR), which would connect the town to the London and Brighton Railway (LBR). The BLHR were awarded the act of parliament to build the railway to Hastings, with an additional option to extend the line through Rye to Ashford. The SER were not happy about a rival company building routes in their area, and in late 1845 researched the feasibility of a route via Tunbridge Wells. The Government insisted the SER constructed the line from Ashford to Hastings (now the Marshlink line) first before any direct route could be built. Meanwhile, the LBR and BLHR had amalgamated with other companies to form the London, Brighton and South Coast Railway, who became bitter rivals with the SER.

The station opened on 13 February 1851, when the line from Ashford was completed through to Bopeep Junction. The station was originally V-shaped, allowing the two railway companies to have separate platforms and booking areas: one side for SER trains to pass through and the other as a terminal for LBSCR services. The two companies continued to argue with each other and object to trains stopping or passing through the station. The SER also wanted separate goods sheds from the LBSCR. The connection to Tunbridge Wells opened on 1 February 1852.

The whole station was reconstructed in a neo-Georgian style in 1931, by the architect James Robb Scott and only the goods shed remained unchanged. All trains now ran through the two new island platforms, which provided better flexibility.

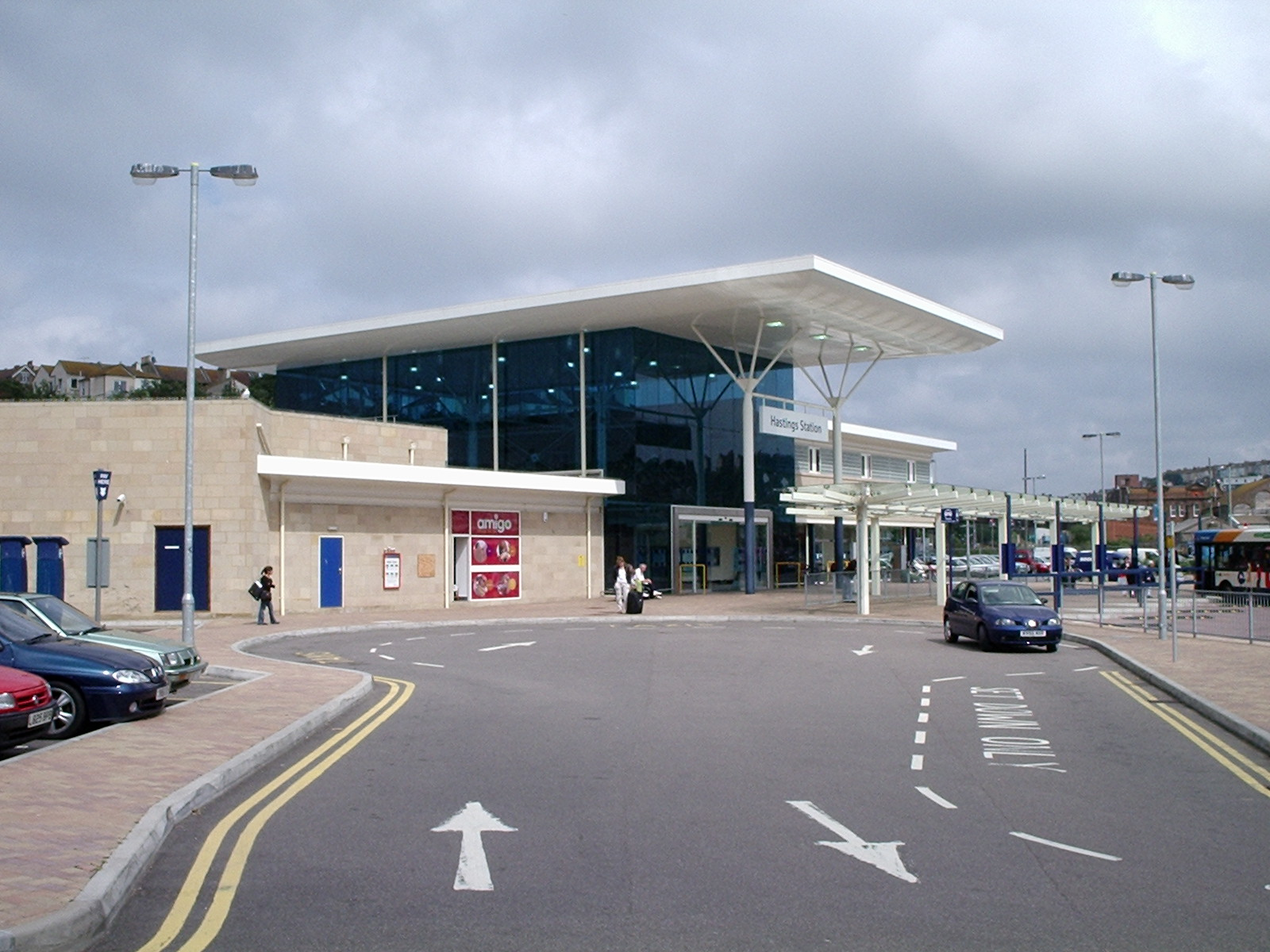
The station building in 2006

The station building was rebuilt in 2003, in a £8.6 million redevelopment as part of regenerating the local area that was launched by deputy prime minister John Prescott. The neo-Georgian booking hall was demolished and replaced with a modernist building. The new station was constructed to the east of the original. It was opened by Jeff Rooker on 14 October 2004, after which the old station building was demolished and the land re-used as a car park.

The southernmost loop platform was curtailed into an Ashford facing bay. The station contains a small police post staffed by British Transport Police, although this is a satellite of the Ashford International police station.

== Services ==
Services at Hastings are operated by two train operating companies; the typical off-peak service in trains per hour (tph) is:

Southern:

- 1 tph to London Victoria, via Gatwick Airport
- 1 tph to Brighton (semi-fast)
- 1 tph to Eastbourne (stopping)
- 2 tph to Ore
- 1 tph to Ashford International.

Southeastern:

- 2 tph to London Charing Cross, via Tonbridge.

Additional services, including trains to and from Cannon Street call at the station during peak hours.

Preceding station	National Rail	Following station
Ore	Southern Marshlink Line	Terminus
St Leonards Warrior Square	Southern East Coastway Line	Ore
St Leonards Warrior Square	Southeastern Hastings Line	Terminus
St Leonards Warrior Square	Southeastern Hastings Line	Ore Limited Service
	Disused railways	
St Leonards; Warrior Square	London, Brighton and South Coast Railway Brighton, Lewes and Hastings railway	Terminus

== Other stations in Hastings ==
- St Leonards Warrior Square, in St Leonards-on-Sea.
- Ore, a small station in Ore.
- West St Leonards, in Bulverhythe.

These two also served the area, but are now closed:

- Bulverhythe, a temporary terminus until the line was extended to St Leonards West Marina
- St Leonards West Marina, on the Brighton, Lewes and Hastings railway.
