= St Leonards West Marina railway station =

Disused railway station in East Sussex, England

Coordinates: 50.85201°N 0.53734°E

St Leonards West Marina
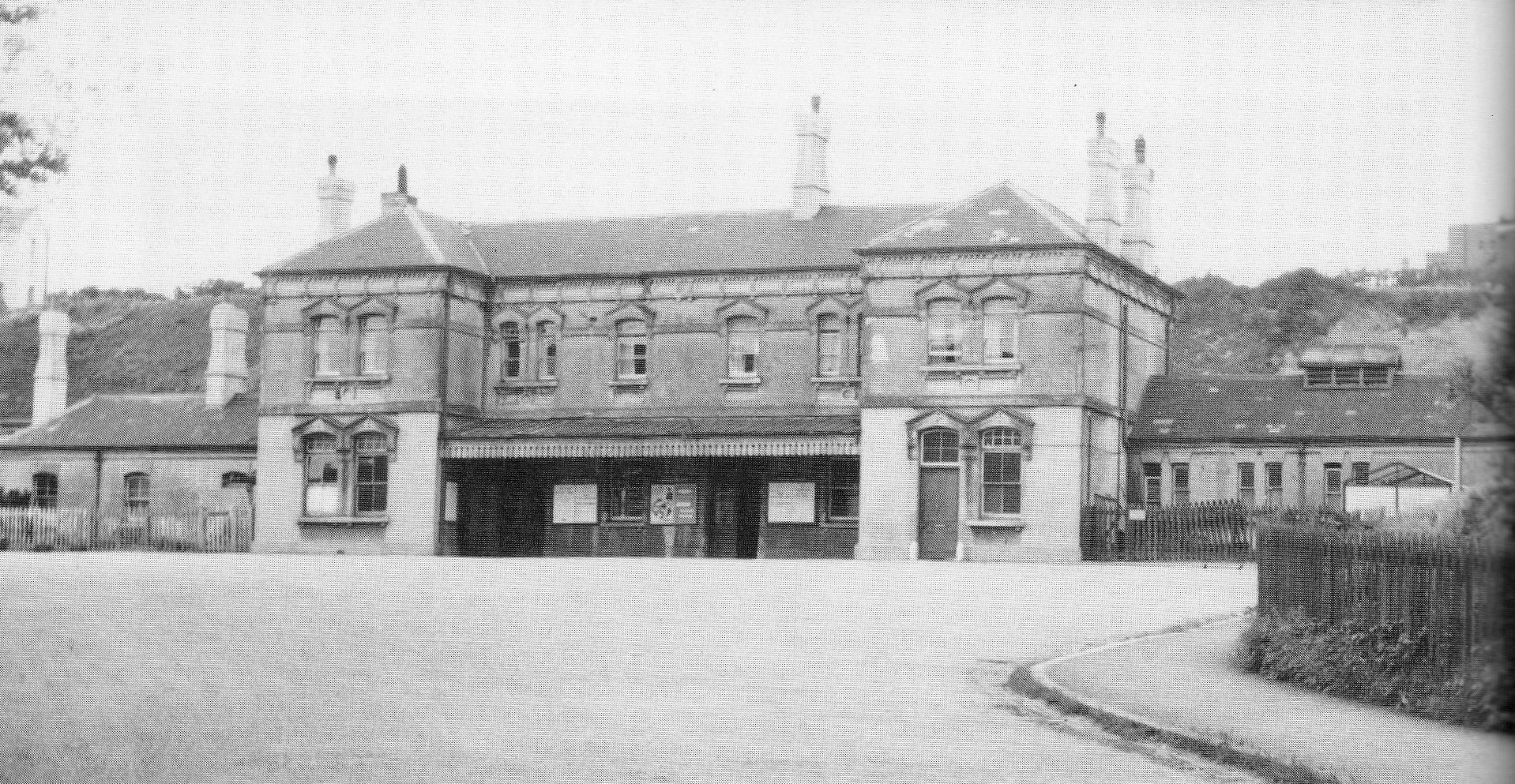
- West Marina Station

General information
- Location: West St Leonards, Hastings, East Sussex; England
- Grid reference: TQ787089
- Platforms: 2

Other information
- Status: Disused

History
- Original company: Brighton, Lewes and Hastings Railway
- Pre-grouping: London, Brighton and South Coast Railway
- Post-grouping: Southern Railway; Southern Region of British Railways

Key dates
- 7 November 1846: Opened as Hastings & St Leonard's
- 13 February 1851: Renamed St Leonards
- 5 December 1870: Renamed St Leonards West Marina
- 1 June 1889: Rebuilt on adjacent site to the east
- 10 November 1962: Closed to goods traffic
- 10 July 1967: Closed to passengers
Location

St Leonards West Marina is a disused railway station in the Bopeep area of the borough of Hastings, East Sussex. Opened by the Brighton, Lewes and Hastings Railway in 1846, it was the first permanent station to serve the area and became part of a feud between two rival railway companies over access to nearby Hastings. Although not very convenient for local services, the station became an important goods rail-head and the location of a Motive Power Depot for steam locomotives working non electrified services, including those to London. The station was closed in 1967 and the buildings subsequently demolished, although in 2026 the down platform could still be seen.

== History ==
=== Opening ===
On 27 June 1846, the Brighton Lewes & Hastings Railway (BL&H) opened from Bexhill to a temporary station at Bulverhythe. The short delay was caused by the diversion of the River Asten / Combe Haven and the subsequent bridgework having to be completed. Bulverhythe Temporary Station was replaced on 7 November 1846 by a permanent station named Hastings & St Leonards which was situated approximately 1 Mile east.

=== LB&SCR and SER feud ===
The BL&H had powers to extend the line to a junction with the South Eastern Railway (SER) at Ashford, thereby creating a coastal route from Brighton to Dover of strategic military importance to the government. The SER took advantage of the government's desire for the line by offering to construct the section between Hastings and Ashford in return for powers to build the North Kent Line, which resulted in the government agreeing to authorise the Hastings-Ashford line provided the SER extended its Tonbridge-Tunbridge Wells line to Hastings. In view of the low revenue earning potential of a Hastings-Ashford line with Rye the largest settlement to be served, the BL&H agreed to transfer ownership of the section to the SER whilst retaining the right to exercise running powers as far as Hastings.

The BL&H had been taken over by the London, Brighton and South Coast Railway (LB&SCR) on 27 July 1846, which decided to exercise the right to run as far as Hastings. This would give it a route from London Bridge to St Leonards of 76.5 miles (123.1 kilometres), somewhat shorter than the SER's circuit of 93 miles (150 kilometres) travelling via Redhill and Tonbridge and then Ashford. A crisis was therefore triggered when the SER's line to Hastings and the short stretch from St Leonards opened simultaneously on 13 February 1851. The SER made it difficult for LB&SCR services to use the new line by holding up a train for so long at Bo-peep junction that it was obliged to return to St Leonards and unload its passengers. Later, the SER tore up track at Bo-Peep and obstructed the line with wagons filled with earth.

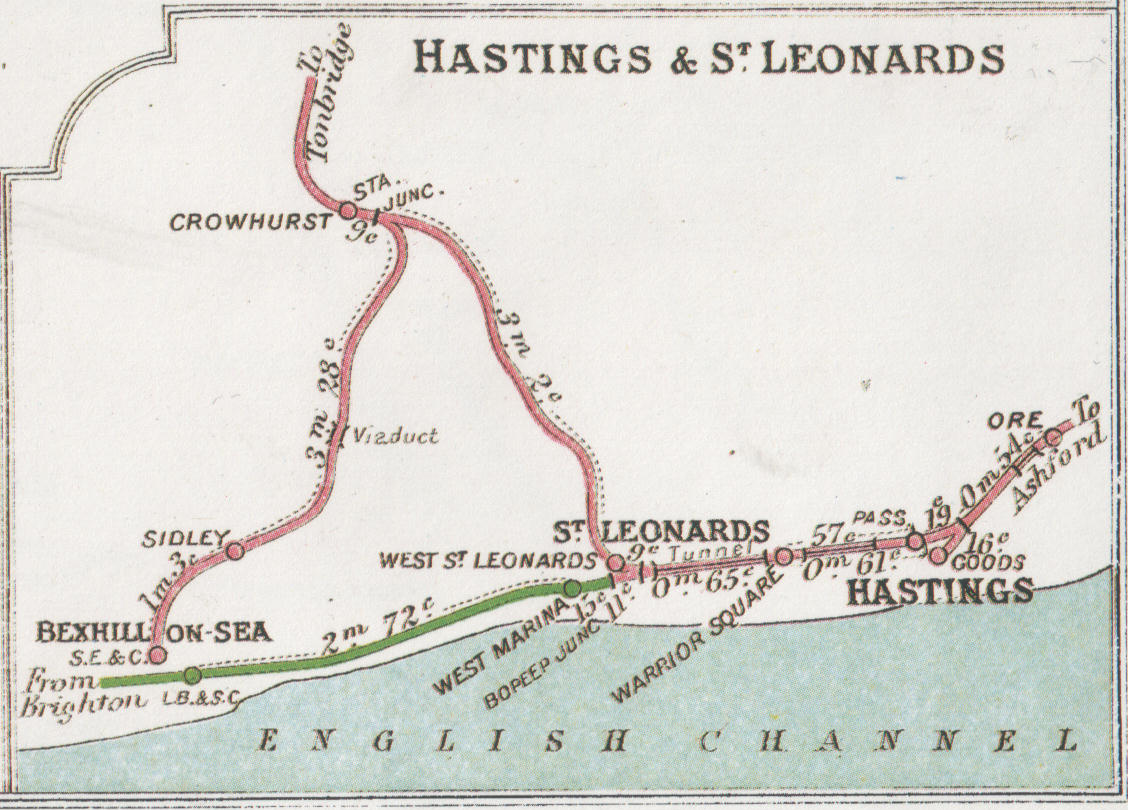
A 1914 Railway Clearing House map of lines around St Leonards.

An injunction obtained by the LB&SCR ensured the reopening of the line and the two companies began to share traffic receipts, culminating in an agreement in 1866 by which St Leonards Warrior Square, the SER's intermediate station between Hastings and the LB&SCR's St Leonards station, became a joint station and facilities were provided here and at Hastings to allow joint SER/LB&SCR operation of the line. LB&SCR services were nevertheless not allowed to call at Warrior Square until December 1870, at which point the LB&SCR changed the name of its own St Leonards station to St Leonards West Marina.

=== Post-feud to closure ===
West Marina was inconveniently situated for local traffic but as it was the only station in the area under the LB&SCR's exclusive control, the station was retained and even developed to become a rail-head for goods traffic. The LB&SCR tried to improve access in 1889 when a new station was built on an adjacent site to the east. The station was provided with a coal yard with sidings, freight sheds and a 49 ft 11 in (15.21 m) turntable.

The stations' importance fell after the 1923 grouping, although it retained a certain importance until the late 1950s as a locomotive depot. Following electrification of the East Coastway line in 1935 by the Southern Railway, the service pattern introduced from May saw express trains from London Victoria call at all stations except West Marina. Nevertheless, the station became the terminus for London services in November 1949 when it was necessary to close Bopeep Tunnel for repairs; buses ferried passengers from West Marina to St Leonards Warrior Square. Normal services through the tunnel resumed on 5 June 1950. Remarkably the now dilapidated station remained open to passengers until 10 July 1967, the station's goods yard already having closed on 26 November 1962. For several years after closure the station platforms remained available for use of railway staff requiring access to the depot.

=== Motive power depot ===
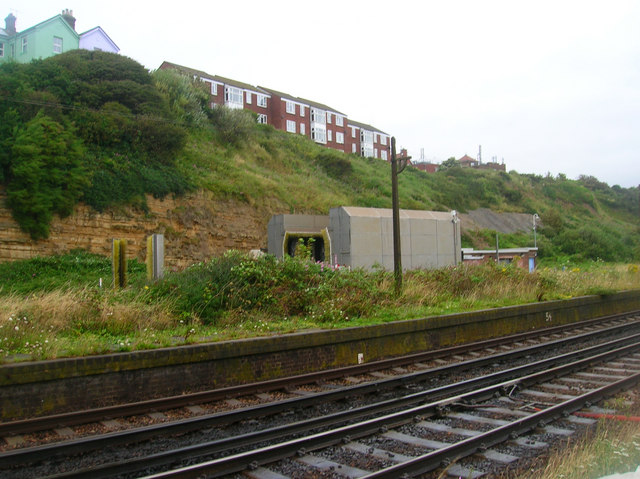
Platform remains in 2007.

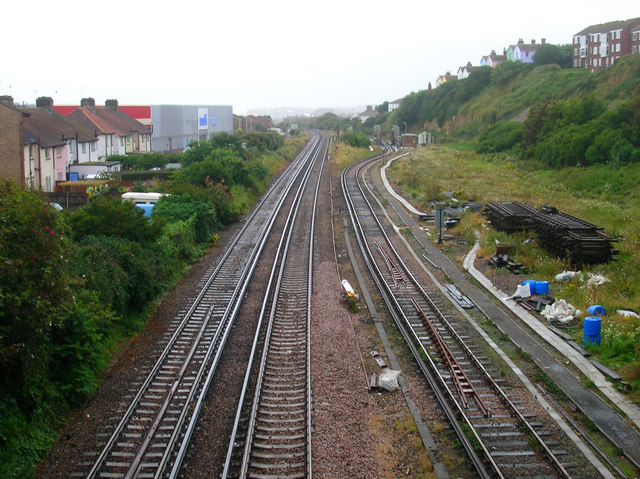
Site of West Marina Station in the distance. The right hand track curves around the remains of the down platform.

A motive power depot was established at the station by the LB&SCR in 1846 on the Down side of the line to the west of the Bo-Peep tunnel. The depot served the Hastings area and was a small two-road shed, constructed in brick with a turntable on the northern side. This was replaced by a second larger 4-road shed in 1872, which was enlarged in 1898 and again by British Railways in 1949. In 1926, the shed had 62 staff including 20 drivers and firemen. Following the demolition of the ex-SER shed at Hastings, West Marina shed grew in importance as it took over the former shed's entire allocation in 1929. A new wheel drop facility was fitted in the same year to assist with the increased workload, as were additional carriage sidings. The first of 12 SR V Schools class locomotives arrived in 1931, adding to the shed's 20-odd 4-4-0s, F1s, Ls and a handful of tank and 0-6-0s. The Schools class were used to work Hastings Line expresses to London. As of January 1947, its allocation consisted of 30 locomotives: 20 4-4-0s, 5 0-4-4Ts and 5 0-6-0s.

Following nationalisation, the shed was given the code 74E and it received a new asbestos roof with brick gables. However, by 1957 the depot's role was much reduced as a result of the first stages of dieselisation which had led to the closure of the servicing point at Hastings station and the withdrawal of most of St Leonards' engines. Further dieselisation resulted in the depot's effective closure in June 1958, although engines continued to be serviced and stabled until 10 November 1967. The bulk of the shed's remaining allocation was transferred to Ashford, Brighton, Tonbridge and Tunbridge Wells West. The depot has now been completely demolished. A new diesel depot was opened to the west of the old steam motive power depot.

Preceding station	Historical railways	Following station
Glyne Gap Halt; Line open, station closed	London, Brighton and South Coast Railway; East Coastway Line	St Leonards Warrior Square; Line and station open

== Present day ==
The station buildings were demolished following closure and the site is now the car park of a TK Maxx warehouse store. Where the engine sheds stood, is now a train washing facility which was built in 1958; TK Maxx and a row of houses now stand where the coal yard and freight sheds once stood. The remains of both platforms can also still be seen.
