= List of places of worship in Tunbridge Wells (borough) =

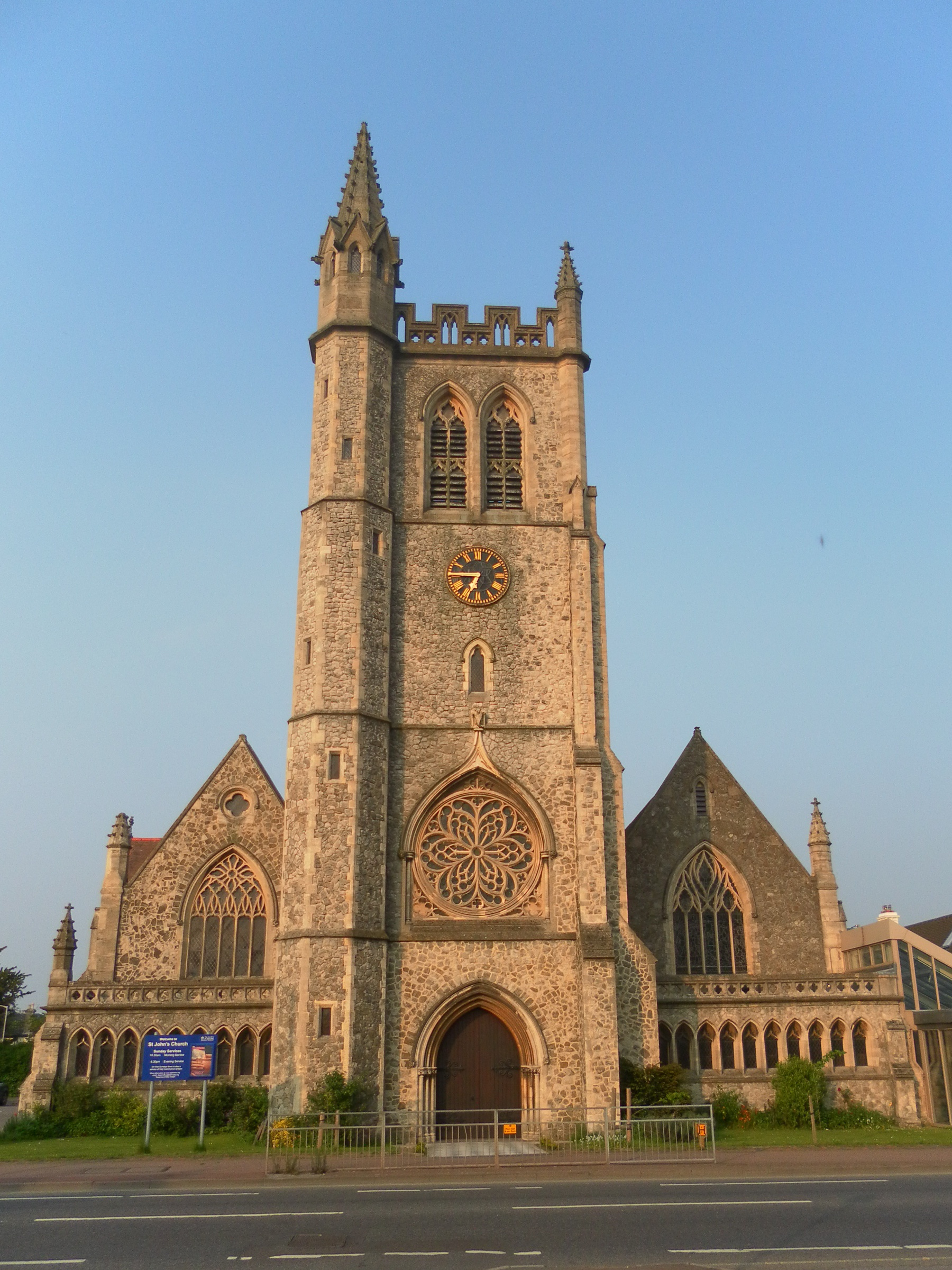
A. D. Gough's St John's Church (1858) is one of several Victorian churches in the town of Royal Tunbridge Wells.

The borough of Tunbridge Wells, one of 13 local government districts in the English county of Kent, has nearly 130 current and former places of worship. The mostly rural area is dominated by the prosperous spa town of Royal Tunbridge Wells and its suburbs, such as Southborough, Pembury and Langton Green. Many of the borough's current and former churches and chapels are in the town, as are the two non-Christian places of worship. Ancient parish churches and small Nonconformist chapels characterise the villages and hamlets elsewhere in the borough, which borders East Sussex in the southwestern part of Kent. 87 places of worship are in use in the borough, serving many Christian denominations and followers of Islam and the Subud movement. A further 37 former places of worship no longer hold religious services but survive in alternative uses.

The majority of Tunbridge Wells residents identify themselves as Christian. Anglican churches serving the Church of England, the country's Established Church, are most numerous: they are found throughout the borough, in tiny villages such as Tudeley and Frittenden, Victorian suburbs such as High Brooms and Ferndale, and modern developments such as the Sherwood housing estate. Three Anglican churches are shared by other denominations, and separate chapels and meeting rooms for non-Anglican worshippers are prevalent as well. Baptists and Roman Catholics each have several places of worship; Brethren meetings take place at several locations in the borough (there are four meeting rooms in Royal Tunbridge Wells alone); and other Christian groups with places of worship in the town include Christian Scientists, the Church of Christ (with two chapels), Latter-day Saints, Quakers and The Salvation Army.

English Heritage has awarded listed status to 43 places of worship in the borough. A building is defined as "listed" when it is placed on a statutory register of buildings of "special architectural or historic interest" in accordance with the Planning (Listed Buildings and Conservation Areas) Act 1990. The Department for Culture, Media and Sport, a Government department, is responsible for this; English Heritage, a non-departmental public body, acts as an agency of the department to administer the process and advise the department on relevant issues. There are three grades of listing status. Grade I, the highest, is defined as being of "exceptional interest"; Grade II* is used for "particularly important buildings of more than special interest"; and Grade II, the lowest, is used for buildings of "special interest". As of February 2001, there were 26 Grade I-listed buildings, 128 with Grade II* status and 2,066 Grade II-listed buildings in the borough of Tunbridge Wells.

== Overview of the borough and its places of worship ==
The borough of Tunbridge Wells is in the southwest of Kent.

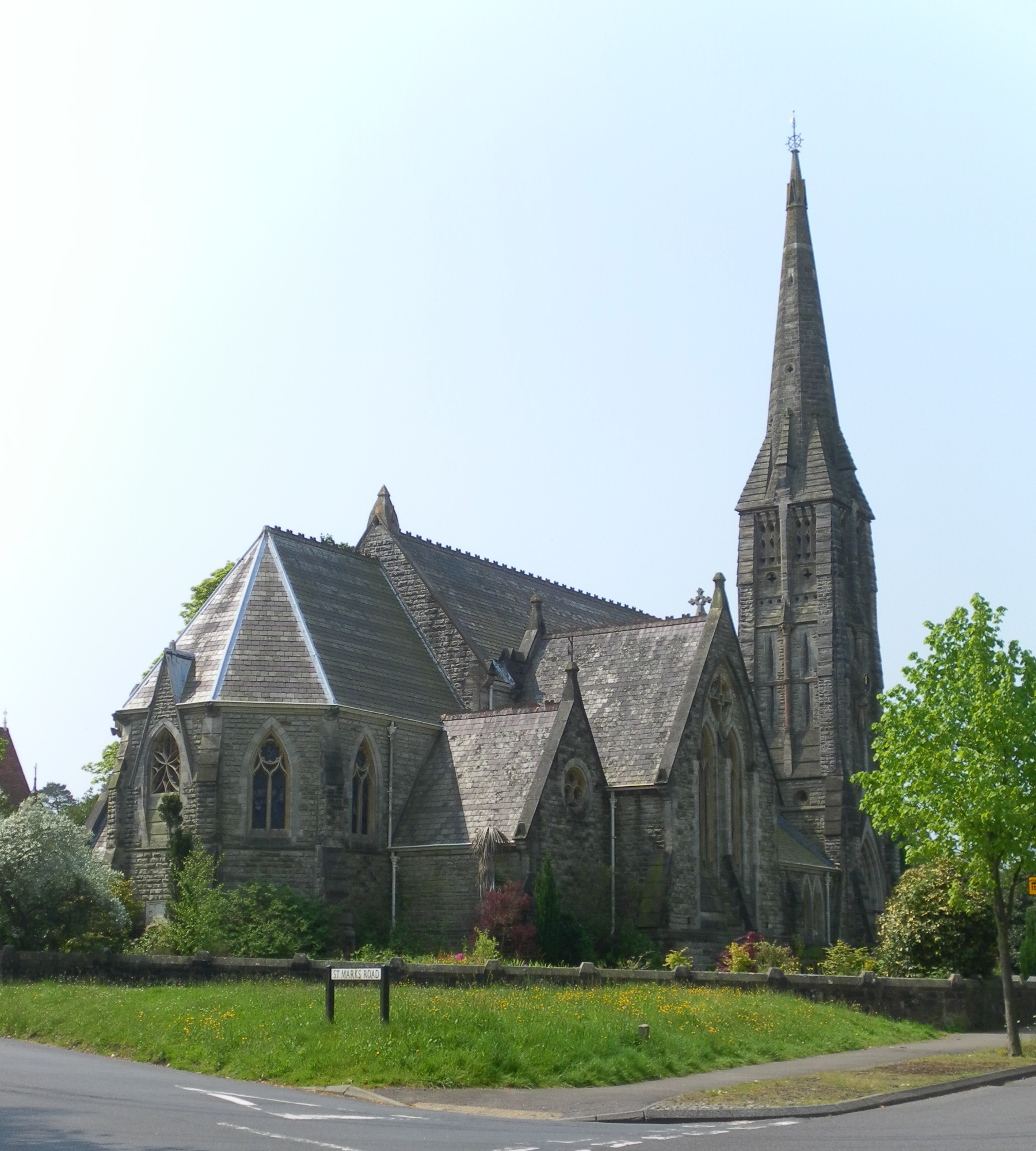
Churchbuilding and the fashionable spa town of Royal Tunbridge Wells both boomed in the 19th century; many new Anglican churches, such as St Mark's (1864–66), were provided there.

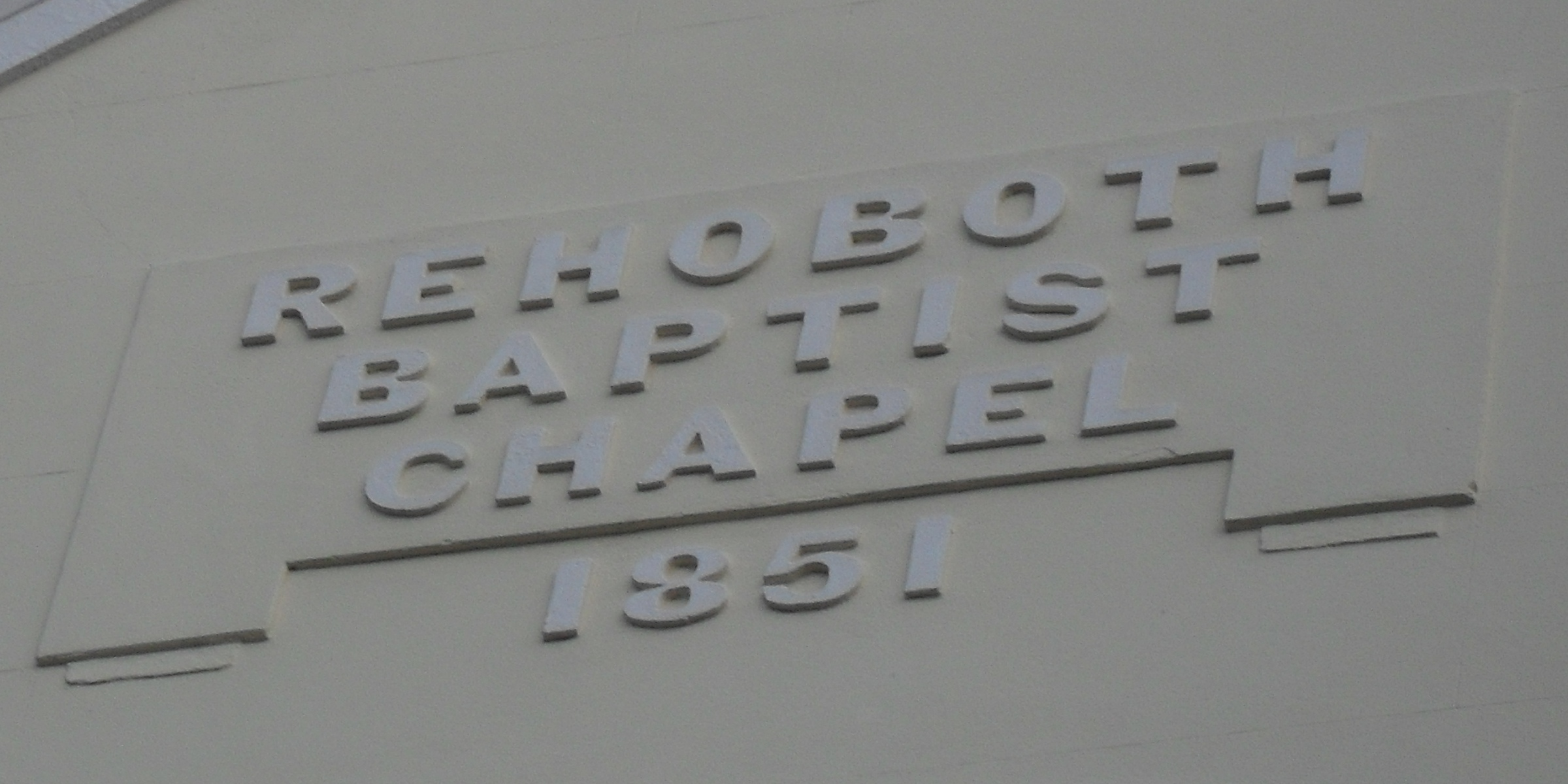
Calvinistic Baptist chapels with Biblical names are common: this plaque is on the former Rehoboth Strict Baptist Chapel at Mount Sion.

The borough of Tunbridge Wells covers 33,133 hectares (81,870 acres) of southwest Kent next to the county of East Sussex. In 2011 the population of the borough was 115,200: just over half lived in the main towns of Royal Tunbridge Wells and Southborough, which together had an estimated population of 56,600 in 2006. Other large villages include the ancient Cranbrook, Goudhurst and Lamberhurst and the more modern Paddock Wood and Pembury. The fertile, undulating and sparsely populated Weald, from whose northern edge the North Downs rise sharply, dominates the rest of the area. Christianity reached England via Kent: in 597 Augustine was sent from Rome by Pope Gregory I to convert the population, and several 7th-century ecclesiastical buildings survive in the county. In this westernmost part of the county, though, most surviving churches date from after the Norman conquest in the late 11th century. Many parish churches date from the 12th century, "as busy a time for building [these] in Kent as for cathedral and monastic works". A typical form consists of a nave without aisles and a smaller, lower chancel, usually without an apse; examples in the borough survive in small villages such as Bidborough and Capel Churches in the larger villages such as Cranbrook, Goudhurst and Hawkhurst date from between the 13th and 15th centuries, having replaced older buildings. Large-scale churchbuilding resumed in the Victorian era, when "decadence and decay" had ruined many churches and population growth and the results of a religious census encouraged the Church of England to improve its provision of buildings for worship. Holy Trinity Church in Royal Tunbridge Wells was expensively funded and designed by prominent architect Decimus Burton at the same time as he was designing the town's most fashionable residential areas; the richly decorated Christ Church at Kilndown, a village with no church, has been "an object of national interest" since its completion in the 1840s; Holy Trinity at Sissinghurst bankrupted its builder but continues to serve its village; and new churches were provided much nearer the centres of population in villages such as Pembury and Horsmonden. Southborough's transformation into a small town and suburb of Royal Tunbridge Wells resulted in four Anglican churches being built between 1830 and 1886, including a mission chapel (now a separate parish church) at High Brooms. The single postwar Anglican church serves a new housing estate in Royal Tunbridge Wells.

Protestant Nonconformist denominations found great support in Kent, especially during the 19th century, and many of their chapels survive in the borough of Tunbridge Wells. In the similar sized neighbouring county of Sussex, 244 such chapels opened between 1818 and 1901, against 765 in Kent. Methodism was followed particularly strongly: 325 Methodist chapels (including Wesleyan, Primitive, Bible Christian and others) were built during that period, against 327 Anglican churches; Baptists and Congregationalists each gained over 150 new places of worship; and nearly 150 meeting rooms, chapels and halls for other denominations were opened. The decline of Methodism since its Victorian heyday and the amalgamation of its various strands into one denomination means that only three chapels are still in use in the borough, along with a shared Anglican and Methodist church at Paddock Wood. Former chapels, some of which closed as recently as the early 21st century, are found in many villages. Calvinism, "the characteristic religion of rural Kent", made its mark in places such as Matfield, Cranbrook, Lamberhurst and Southborough, each of which has a surviving Strict Baptist chapel. These are "typically small, neat, plain, porched and with a Hebrew name": Matfield's is called Ebenezer, as is a former chapel at Hawkhurst, and other closed chapels for Calvinistic Baptists include Providence (Cranbrook and Curtisden Green), Rehoboth (Royal Tunbridge Wells) and Jehovah Jireh (in a hamlet near Brenchley). The United Reformed Church, successor to the Congregational Church whose followers were so prevalent in the county in the 19th century, also retains three churches of its own and another shared with Anglicans. In Royal Tunbridge Wells, the vast Mount Pleasant Congregational Church (1845–48, with a huge Tuscan-columned portico and pediment of 1868) and an outlying chapel in the town's Albion Road were closed as the denomination based its worship around fewer, larger and better located churches. Plymouth and Open Brethren, served by 19 meeting rooms across Kent by 1901, have always been well provided for in the Tunbridge Wells area; three places of worship in use by World War II have been supplemented by others since the 1980s, including a large meeting hall at Five Oak Green. Brethren worshippers' "attachment to makeshift premises" and "purposeful indifference to any form of pretension" in architecture is in evidence in these modern buildings, but their oldest place of worship (the York Road Assembly of c. 1891) is a distinctive stuccoed Classical-style building.

Roman Catholic worship takes place in several villages as well as in Royal Tunbridge Wells itself. Most churches are postwar, but the large St Augustine's Church in Royal Tunbridge Wells (1965) succeeds a landmark building of 1837–38, built of local stone and with a campanile added later. Occupying a prominent town-centre position, it was demolished for commercial redevelopment in 1967 after the new church opened. In some places, Catholics used private houses before permanent churches were built: this happened at Cranbrook and Goudhurst, and in Pembury part of the priest's house (acquired before a church could be built) was temporarily registered as a chapel in the 1960s.

== Religious affiliation ==
According to the United Kingdom Census 2001, 104,030 people lived in the borough of Tunbridge Wells. Of these, 75.03% identified themselves as Christian, 0.57% were Muslim, 0.26% were Buddhist, 0.19% were Hindu, 0.17% were Jewish, 0.04% were Sikh, 0.31% followed another religion, 16.02% claimed no religious affiliation and 7.41% did not state their religion. The proportion of Christians was much higher than the 71.74% in England as a whole, and the proportions of people with no religious affiliation and of followers of other religions not listed in the Census were also higher than the national averages (14.59% and 0.29% respectively). Adherents of Islam, Hinduism, Judaism and Sikhism were much less prevalent in the district than in England overall: in 2001, 3.1% of people in England were Muslim, 1.11% were Hindu, 0.67% were Sikh and 0.52% were Jewish. The proportion of Buddhists was also slightly lower than the national figure of 0.28%.

== Administration ==
=== Anglican churches ===
Most Anglican churches in the borough are in the Archdeaconry of Tonbridge, one of three archdeaconries in the Diocese of Rochester. The seat of the diocese is Rochester Cathedral. The archdeaconry is further divided into six deaneries. The churches at Ashurst, Bidborough, Groombridge and Speldhurst are part of the Tunbridge Wells Deanery, as are all 16 in the Royal Tunbridge Wells/Southborough urban area (one each at Broadwater Down and Langton Green, two at Rusthall, four in Southborough and eight in Royal Tunbridge Wells). Those at Brenchley, Horsmonden, Lamberhurst, Matfield, Paddock Wood and Pembury are in the Paddock Wood Deanery. Tudeley and Five Oak Green churches are within the Tonbridge Deanery.

The area's other Anglican churches are administered by the Weald Deanery, part of the Archdeaconry of Maidstone which is in turn one of three archdeaconries in the Diocese of Canterbury. The churches at Benenden, Cranbrook, Frittenden, Goudhurst, Hawkhurst, Kilndown, Sandhurst (two churches) and Sissinghurst are in this deanery. The Diocese of Canterbury's seat is Canterbury Cathedral.

=== Roman Catholic churches ===
The nine Roman Catholic churches in the borough—at Benenden, Cranbrook, Goudhurst, Hawkhurst, Horsmonden, Paddock Wood, Pembury, Royal Tunbridge Wells and Southborough—are in the Archdiocese of Southwark, whose seat is St George's Cathedral in Southwark, southeast London. The archdiocese has 20 deaneries, of which seven are in Kent. The churches at Paddock Wood, Pembury, Royal Tunbridge Wells and Southborough are in the Tunbridge Wells Deanery. Those in the joint parish of Goudhurst, Hawkhurst and Horsmonden are in Maidstone Deanery, as is the church at Cranbrook and its associated Mass Centre at Benenden.

=== Baptist churches ===
About 150 Baptist churches in southeast England are part of the South Eastern Baptist Association, which arranges its member congregations into geographical networks. The churches at Hawkhurst and Sandhurst are part of the organisation's South Kent Network, while those at Pembury and Royal Tunbridge Wells (Upper Grosvenor Road) are in the Tonbridge Network—as are the Paddock Wood Baptist Church, which meets in a school rather than a building of its own, and Speldhurst Chapel, which is administratively linked to Tonbridge Baptist Church. A number of Strict and Reformed Baptist congregations also worship in chapels in the borough. Cranbrook, Lamberhurst, Matfield and Southborough each have one, and there are two in Royal Tunbridge Wells: the early 19th-century Hanover Chapel and the modern Pantiles Baptist Church. All are affiliated with the Gospel Standard movement except Southborough and the Pantiles chapel; the latter belongs to GraceNet UK, an association of Reformed Evangelical Christian churches and organisations.

=== Methodist churches ===
As of 2010, St John's Methodist Church in Southborough and Horsmonden Methodist Church were part of the Tunbridge Wells Methodist Circuit within that denomination's South East District. Vale Royal Methodist Church in Royal Tunbridge Wells and the churches at Hawkhurst and Sandhurst, all now closed, were also part of this group.

=== Congregational Federation churches ===
Cranbrook Congregational Church and Iden Green Congregational Church are part of the Congregational Federation, an association of independent Congregational churches in Great Britain. The federation came into existence in 1972 when the Congregational Church in England and Wales merged with several other denominations to form the United Reformed Church. Certain congregations wanted to remain independent of this, and instead joined the Congregational Federation. As of January 2021 there were 235 churches in the Federation.

== Current places of worship ==
Current places of worship
Name	Image	Location	Denomination/ Affiliation	Grade	Notes	Refs
St Martin of Tours Church		Ashurst; 51.1302°N 0.1532°E	Anglican	I	Several rounds of Victorian restoration were carried out here, but the sandstone chancel and nave retain their 14th/15th-century appearance. The "pretty west bellcote" is weatherboarded, and the porch on the south side bears the date 1621.	
St George's Church		Benenden; 51.0649°N 0.5795°E	Anglican	II*	David Brandon restored this ancient church in 1862 in a Perpendicular Gothic Revival style. The "large and handsome" sandstone building had been only partly rebuilt after lightning damage in 1672. Four ancient windows survive.	
Benenden Catholic Chapel		Benenden; 51.0732°N 0.5801°E	Roman Catholic	–	This church has always been linked to that at Cranbrook, founded in the 1930s in what was originally Goudhurst parish. Since then St Theodore's Church at Cranbrook has gained its own parish, but Benenden Chapel remains a dependent Mass centre.	
St Lawrence's Church		Bidborough; 51.1667°N 0.2372°E	Anglican	II*	This small sandstone church of the Norman era is elevated above the village. A north aisle was added in the 13th century, and Ewan Christian built one to the south in 1876. The tower is Perpendicular Gothic, as is the east window.	
All Saints Church		Brenchley; 51.1500°N 0.4003°E	Anglican	I	Mostly 13th- and 14th-century, with aisles and slightly later transepts on both sides, this large church has a bulky, heavily buttressed tower rising in "short, jerky steps" and topped by a concave-sided turret. Numerous monuments survive inside.	
St Mark's Church		Broadwater Down, Royal Tunbridge Wells; 51.1158°N 0.2516°E	Anglican	II*	R.L. Roumieu's eccentric "Late Italian Gothic Revival" stone church has been called "at a distant view quite handsome" but "incredibly complex and ugly" in closeup. The prominent tower has a 140-foot (43 m) spire with distinctive lucarnes and colonnettes. The 4th Earl of Abergavenny paid for the church, which was completed in 1866.	
Broadmead Church		Broadwater Down, Royal Tunbridge Wells; 51.1176°N 0.2503°E	Evangelical	–	The 70-capacity building for this Bible-based Evangelical church was completed in 1981 on a site donated by the builders who were developing the estate. Its origins lay in a Sunday School established in the 1960s on the nearby Ramslye estate. The building was registered for marriages in June 1982.	
St Dunstan's Church		Cranbrook; 51.0973°N 0.5363°E	Anglican	I	The high-naved, short-towered, prominently sited church took shape over a long period in the medieval era. Work started in the late 13th century, the chancel arch and porch are a century later, the nave and tower were added after 1500, and Slater and Christian restored the building in 1863.	
Cranbrook Strict Baptist Chapel		Cranbrook; 51.0953°N 0.5378°E	Baptist	II	This is the only survivor of two Strict Baptist chapels within a short distance in the village centre: Providence Chapel is now closed. "As humble as any cottage", it is weatherboarded and has arched windows. A single gravestone stands outside.	
Cranbrook Congregational Church		Cranbrook; 51.0962°N 0.5346°E	Congregational Federation	II	Cranbrook's first Congregational chapel dated from 1831. This £1,400 building, erected in 1857, replaced it. It remains Congregational, having stayed outside the United Reformed Church denomination. Built of yellow brick in the Gothic Revival style (whose Decorated Gothic influence is visible in the tracery), it has a front porch with a small rose window above.	
St Theodore's Church		Cranbrook; 51.0943°N 0.5281°E	Roman Catholic	–	Lady Millicent Moore—wife of Sir Norman Moore, 1st Baronet—founded a Catholic oratory in her house in the village in 1935. Local Catholics previously worshipped in Goudhurst. Another house was used from 1947 until 1958, when land was donated for a permanent church. The first Mass was held on 28 November 1958.	
St James's Church		Ferndale, Royal Tunbridge Wells; 51.1356°N 0.2735°E	Anglican	II	Ewan Christian's local stone Decorated Gothic Revival church of 1860–62 cost £6,000. A north aisle was built 18 years later. A tall-spired tower stands at the northwest corner, and the chancel is apsidal.	
Church of Jesus Christ of Latter-day Saints		Ferndale, Royal Tunbridge Wells; 51.1396°N 0.2837°E	Latter-day Saint	–	The Tunbridge Wells Chapel of the Church of Jesus Christ of Latter-day Saints was registered for the solemnisation of marriages in June 1989.	
Five Oak Green United Church		Five Oak Green; 51.1815°N 0.3618°E	Anglican/United Reformed Church	–	The two denominations worshipped in separate buildings in the village until 1985. This building, which replaced the original Congregational chapel in 1925, became United Reformed in 1972. In 1985 a LEP was formed to bring the two congregations together in a "united church".	
The Meeting Hall		Five Oak Green; 51.1876°N 0.3633°E	Brethren	–	Overcrowding at the 120-capacity Brethren meeting hall on the Sherwood estate in Royal Tunbridge Wells meant that the group sought a larger building. Permission to convert a barn near Five Oak Green village into a place of worship was granted in 2004, a temporary building on the site was registered for marriages in October 2006, and its permanent replacement was registered in April 2013.	
St Mary's Church		Frittenden; 51.1391°N 0.5905°E	Anglican	II*	The Perpendicular Gothic church was wrecked by fire in 1790, and R.C. Hussey's restoration of 1846–48 was effectively a total rebuilding in brown sandstone. A north aisle was built in 1861, and the spire-topped tower was added 20 years later.	
St Mary's Church		Goudhurst; 51.1137°N 0.4616°E	Anglican	I	The large 13th-century sandstone church, with aisles to the naves and side chapels in the chancel, gained a Classical/Gothic tower in the 1630s and was restored in the 1860s by Slater and Carpenter.	
Church of the Sacred Heart		Goudhurst; 51.1156°N 0.4697°E	Roman Catholic	–	Goudhurst's Catholic church was provided by a Miss Dashwood in 1882 in association for her "Home for Cripples" at the adjacent Oakley House. The brick and tile Vernacular-style chapel has a stuccoed interior.	
St John the Baptist's Chapel		Groombridge; 51.1180°N 0.1856°E	Anglican	I	John Packer bought Groombridge Place from the 3rd Earl of Dorset in 1618, and built a private chapel in the grounds seven years later. Now the Anglican parish church of Old Groombridge, it was enlarged and restored in 1818 and 1895 but is otherwise unchanged: a simple Gothic chapel of red brick and orange-hued sandstone.	
Hawkenbury United Reformed Church		Hawkenbury; 51.1264°N 0.2810°E	United Reformed Church	–	Architects Potts, Sulman and Hennings designed this simple red-brick church in 1899. Extensions were built in a similar style in 1907 (a schoolroom) and 1926 (a hall). A Mr Le Lacheur paid for the building, whose tiled roof is topped by a turret.	
St Laurence's Church		Hawkhurst; 51.0376°N 0.5032°E	Anglican	I	Hawkhurst's parish church is distant from the village centre in The Moor area. "Long, bold and battlemented", it is a Perpendicular Gothic building of Kentish Ragstone with Decorated Gothic windows and a gigantic chancel arch of the 14th century. Slater and Christian restored the church in the 1850s.	
Hawkhurst Baptist Church		Hawkhurst; 51.0501°N 0.5091°E	Baptist	–	An 18th-century Baptist cause was restarted in 1889. Small-scale meetings quickly grew, and Birmingham architect George Hawkes designed a large brick and stone Gothic Revival chapel in 1892–93. Local builder Lewis Edwards erected it for £1,620.	
St Barnabas' Church		Hawkhurst; 51.0488°N 0.5066°E	Roman Catholic	–	Hawkhurst's Roman Catholic church is one of three in the parish of Goudhurst, Hawkhurst and Horsmonden. Mass is celebrated on Sundays and Fridays. The church was registered for marriages in March 1965.	
St Matthew's Church		High Brooms; 51.1506°N 0.2743°E	Anglican	–	A mission church to St Peter's parish church in Southborough, built of brick in 1886, was superseded in 1902 by another red-brick building. The new church was immediately given its own parish.	
Tunbridge Wells Church of Christ		High Brooms; 51.1477°N 0.2752°E	Church of Christ	–	This modern building near High Brooms railway station is registered for worship by the Church of Christ denomination.	
New Covenant Church		High Brooms; 51.1516°N 0.2723°E	Evangelical	–	Now registered for Evangelical worship under this name, the building started its religious life in 1898 as one of two Wesleyan Methodist chapels in Southborough parish. Designed by Herbert Murkin Caley and built by J. Jarvis using red brick and stone, it later became the Bethel Evangelical Free Church.	
St Margaret's Church		Horsmonden; 51.1170°N 0.4330°E	Anglican	I	Far distant from the village, with only oast houses around it, this early 14th-century church has a four-stage 15th-century at the west end and several large lancet windows to the nave. T.H. Wyatt carried out a restoration in 1867.	
Horsmonden Methodist Church		Horsmonden; 51.1398°N 0.4269°E	Methodist	–	The present church building in the centre of the village has served Methodists across a wide area since 1965, but was originally built for Plymouth Brethren. Horsmonden's first Methodist chapel, a brick building of 1846 on the Goudhurst Road, was demolished in 1969.	
All Saints Church		Horsmonden; 51.1470°N 0.4363°E	Roman Catholic	II	Robert Wheeler designed this Early English Gothic Revival church in 1869 as a chapel of ease to St Margaret's Anglican church. The brick and tile building cost £1,600 and has a distinctive apse. Closed in 1970 and declared redundant in 1971, it was bought and rededicated by the Catholic Church in 1972.	
Iden Green Congregational Church		Iden Green, Benenden; 51.0575°N 0.5740°E	Congregational Federation	–	Always a Congregational church, the present brick building of 1953 succeeds a war-damaged chapel nearby. This was a simple weatherboarded building with varnished interior walls.	
Christ Church		Kilndown; 51.0908°N 0.4270°E	Anglican	I	Anthony Salvin started building this church in 1839 on behalf of Viscount Beresford, but the Viscount's 20-year-old stepson Alexander Beresford Hope took over soon afterwards, turning the sandstone Gothic Revival building into "the Ecclesiological Society's showcase church" with its extensive interior decoration and lavish fittings. It was repaired after wartime bomb damage.	
St Mary's Church		Lamberhurst; 51.1051°N 0.3957°E	Anglican	I	Only an 18th-century mansion stands alongside the hilltop church east of the village. The 14th-century Decorated Gothic church has a Perpendicular Gothic tower and some 17th-century fittings. One lancet window may survive from an older building on the site.	
Lamberhurst Strict Baptist Chapel		Lamberhurst; 51.0989°N 0.3898°E	Baptist	II	A chapel of 1816 was rebuilt in a Neoclassical style 1851 using grey/blue and red brick. The windows are round-arched, and a brick-dressed oculus pierces the pediment of the gable end. Original sash windows survive in a two-storey section at the rear.	
All Saints Church		Langton Green; 51.1319°N 0.2047°E	Anglican	II*	George Gilbert Scott's sandstone church of 1864–66 has aisles on both sides of the nave and lancet windows breaking through a low-pitched roof, which also has a bellcote. Rich internal fittings include an alabaster reredos depicting the Supper at Emmaus.	
St Luke's Church		Matfield; 51.1526°N 0.3711°E	Anglican	II	Basil Champneys' budget for this wayside church was £2,000, which paid for a small building with a single aisle to the nave, a spire-topped timber bell-turret and a gabled entrance porch. The walls are of sandstone, and the windows have tracery in the Decorated Gothic style (one also has Kempe stained glass).	
Ebenezer Strict Baptist Chapel		Matfield; 51.1528°N 0.3728°E	Baptist	–	This Gospel Standard Strict Baptist chapel was registered for marriages in June 1937, replacing an earlier building on the same site.	
Church of King Charles the Martyr		Mount Sion, Royal Tunbridge Wells; 51.1267°N 0.2593°E	Anglican	I	Famed for its intricate plaster ceilings supported on Ionic columns, this chapel was built between 1676 and 1690 and was only parished in the 1880s after Ewan Christian restored it. Several stories are linked to its alleged position overlapping three old parish boundaries.	
Christ Church Centre		Mount Sion, Royal Tunbridge Wells; 51.1288°N 0.2629°E	Anglican	–	R. Palmer Browne designed the first church in 1836–41 in a "coarse" Neo-Norman style using white brick at a cost of £8,500. Derelict by the 1990s, it was declared redundant in February 1996, demolished and replaced with the present combined church and commercial development which retains the Christ Church name.	
First Church of Christ, Scientist		Mount Sion, Royal Tunbridge Wells; 51.1251°N 0.2574°E	Christian Scientist	–	This denomination worshipped in the town from 1931, when a "highly interesting" concrete-framed circular building by Cecil Burns was built on the London Road. After that was sold in 1959, the congregation moved to this new building on Linden Park Road.	
St Andrew's Church		Paddock Wood; 51.1763°N 0.3852°E	Anglican/Methodist	–	Local architect Cecil Burns designed this replacement church in 1953, on a different site from its bombed predecessor of 1860. The red-brick building is Gothic in style but "without historical precedent". A stumpy octagonal tower with an internal dome separates the nave and chancel. It was registered for marriages as a joint church in 1982.	
Paddock Wood Christian Fellowship		Paddock Wood; 51.1797°N 0.3847°E	Assemblies of God	–	Founded as Paddock Wood Pentecostal Church in 1958, two years after meetings began at a mobile church, this Pentecostal congregation took its present name in 1994. The building dates from 1960.	
St Justus' Church		Paddock Wood; 51.1795°N 0.3841°E	Roman Catholic	–	Paddock Wood's first Roman Catholic church was built in 1950 and registered for the solemnisation of marriages in August 1951. It became the church hall when a larger building was constructed alongside; this opened in 1981.	
St Peter's Old Church		Pembury; 51.1628°N 0.3253°E	Anglican	I	The brown sandstone church is isolated from modern Pembury, standing in fields 1 1/2 miles (2.4 km) to the north. It combines Norman and 14th-century work, although a restoration in 1887 affected the appearance of the interior.	
St Peter's Upper Church		Pembury; 51.1420°N 0.3231°E	Anglican	II*	Architect E.W. Stephens provided this church in 1846–47 in a much more central location than the old parish church. George Pratt, 2nd Marquess Camden bore the £2,500 cost. The building is of sandstone and Perpendicular Gothic Revival in style.	
Pembury Baptist Church		Pembury; 51.1475°N 0.3280°E	Baptist	–	Originally called Union Church and later Pembury Free Church, this Queen Anne-style building (designed by J. Wallis Chapman in 1887, and built for £1,241 by G. and F. Penn) was shared by Congregationalists before becoming solely Baptist. It is of red brick with a slate roof.	
St Anselm's Church		Pembury; 51.1452°N 0.3236°E	Roman Catholic	–	A presbytery was bought on Lower Green Road in the village in 1964, and a church hall was built alongside. A room in the presbytery was registered as a chapel for worship, but this was superseded by a permanent church next to the hall in 1980.	
St Barnabas' Church		Royal Tunbridge Wells; 51.1385°N 0.2697°E	Anglican	II	The Cutts brothers' "grandly proportioned" red-brick and stone church of 1889–93 was built on the site of St Stephen's Church, whose reputation had been affected by arguments over ritualism. The tall nave and chancel both have clerestories. A tower was intended but never built.	
St John's Church		Royal Tunbridge Wells; 51.1403°N 0.2611°E	Anglican	II	E.E. Cronk's additions of 1871 and 1896 obscure the Decorated Gothic Revival origins of A.D. Gough's Kentish Ragstone church of 1858. The east window has stained glass by C.E. Kempe.	
St Luke's Church		Royal Tunbridge Wells; 51.1448°N 0.2690°E	Anglican/Russian Orthodox	–	A mission church linked to St John's Church was provided on the site in 1895, but in 1910 it was superseded by the present building—designed by E.E. Cronk and considered old-fashioned in its design (architectural historian John Newman said it was "like a church of the 1870s"). A Russian Orthodox congregation under the Moscow Patriarchate has occasional use of the building.	
St Peter's Church		Royal Tunbridge Wells; 51.1304°N 0.2754°E	Anglican	–	Housing development in the Windmill Fields area east of the town on the road to Hawkenbury prompted the construction in 1874–75 of this spire-topped church to a design by H.H. Cronk. His brother E.E. Cronk helped him add a north aisle in 1889. The sandstone church is Decorated Gothic Revival in style.	
Hanover Strict Baptist Chapel		Royal Tunbridge Wells; 51.1356°N 0.2622°E	Baptist	II	Meetings began in a schoolroom in 1833, and the present chapel and its site, designed by Henry Kewell and opened on 6 November 1834, cost £1,265. He provided a red-brick Classical-style building with a porch below a pedimented gable end. An 1883 guidebook stated that it was "recently completely reconstructed". The façade has three straight-headed sash windows.	
Pantiles Baptist Church		Royal Tunbridge Wells; 51.1187°N 0.2604°E	Baptist	–	The congregations of the former Grove Hill and Rehoboth Strict Baptist chapels came together in 1984, acquired a former school, adapted some of its buildings and erected a new chapel alongside. Rehoboth was still used for a time, but the new chapel was registered for marriages in November 1995.	
Tunbridge Wells Baptist Church		Royal Tunbridge Wells; 51.1366°N 0.2644°E	Baptist	–	Lander and Bedells' expensively designed Baptist Tabernacle (it cost £5,759 in 1883) was superseded by the present brick building on Upper Grosvenor Road in 1938.	
Culverden Evangelical Church		Royal Tunbridge Wells; 51.1379°N 0.2619°E	Brethren	–	Dated 1923 on its gable and registered for marriages (under the name Culverden Hall) in February 1927, this chapel on St John's Road is used for worship by Open Brethren.	
Hill Street Brethren		Royal Tunbridge Wells; 51.1372°N 0.2668°E	Brethren	–	This brick building was opened in 1904 as a Wesleyan Methodist mission chapel, replacing a tin tabernacle of 1875 on the same site. Brethren acquired it in 1934, initially naming it Salem Chapel.	
York Road Christian Assembly		Royal Tunbridge Wells; 51.1332°N 0.2604°E	Brethren	–	This meeting room dates from about 1891. The single-storey Classical building is faced with stucco.	
Tunbridge Wells Christian Fellowship		Royal Tunbridge Wells; 51.1352°N 0.2623°E	Assemblies of God	–	The Christian Centre on Hanover Road is home to this congregation of the Assemblies of God Pentecostal denomination.	
Commercial Road Church of Christ		Royal Tunbridge Wells; 51.1376°N 0.2694°E	Church of Christ	–	Originally built for the Disciples of Christ denomination in 1877, this chapel later passed to the Church of Christ. The cost of construction was £600, and the materials were white brick and stone. The roof is gabled.	
Calvary Church		Royal Tunbridge Wells; 51.1354°N 0.2676°E	Evangelical	–	This church is part of the Royal Victoria Place shopping centre in the redeveloped town centre. It replaced the former Calvary Mission on Victoria Road, a chapel whose marriage registration was cancelled in February 1992.	
En-Noor Mosque (Tunbridge Wells Islamic Cultural Centre)		Royal Tunbridge Wells; 51.1363°N 0.2689°E	Muslim	–	This is a combined mosque and community centre for the area's Muslim followers. It occupies a building on the town's Camden Road, and includes a madrasah with regular evening lessons.	
Friends Meeting House		Royal Tunbridge Wells; 51.1372°N 0.2624°E	Quaker	–	A "handsome", "contemporary Domestic-style" red-brick building in Grosvenor Park, designed by prolific Brighton architects Clayton & Black, this is the only purpose-built 19th-century Quaker place of worship in Kent. It dates from 1894 and cost £2,100 overall (construction cost £1,824). Worship previously took place in a house and in the Mechanics' Institute building nearby. In 2014 it was proposed to convert part of the building into housing, retaining a hall for Quakers to use.	
St Augustine's Church		Royal Tunbridge Wells; 51.1317°N 0.2669°E	Roman Catholic	–	The present church, a large, low building completed in 1965, is the successor to a Classical-style sandstone building in the town centre, also dedicated to Augustine of Canterbury and built in 1837–38 by Joseph Ireland. It was demolished in 1968.	
Salvation Army Citadel		Royal Tunbridge Wells; 51.1315°N 0.2737°E	Salvation Army	–	The present citadel replaces a Romanesque Revival predecessor in Varney Street, erected in 1886. This ornate red-brick building was demolished after the new building on Bayhall Road opened in 1970.	
Subud House		Royal Tunbridge Wells; 51.1418°N 0.2588°E	Subud	–	This building on Culverden Down was registered in October 1987 for use by the Subud group, a religious movement that originated in Indonesia. The group had previously registered the former Wesleyan Methodist chapel in nearby Pembury for their use, between July 1973 and February 1980.	
Tunbridge Wells United Reformed Church		Royal Tunbridge Wells; 51.1368°N 0.2617°E	United Reformed Church/Methodist	–	Herbert Murkin Caley's brick, stone and slate Gothic Revival church of 1899, which cost £7,560 including its associated buildings, stands on Mount Ephraim. It was originally St John's Free Baptist Church: it was built for a former minister of Emmanuel Church, who seceded after changing his views. It was sold to the Presbyterian Church and is now United Reformed. The congregational of Vale Royal Methodist Church have shared the church since their building was sold in 2015.	
St Paul's Church		Rusthall; 51.1308°N 0.2376°E	Anglican	II	H.J. Stevens and the unrelated N.E. Stevens worked together on this Early English/Decorated Gothic Revival church, built of local sandstone in 1849–50 and extended in 1864. The cruciform building is anchored by a square-topped central tower. In John Newman's words, "the churchyard is chockablock with expensive tombstones and memorials", reflecting the local wealth.	
St Paul's Church Centre		Rusthall; 51.1353°N 0.2313°E	Anglican	–	Centrally located on the village High Street, this has always been a mission church associated with the parish church of the same dedication. Henry Taylor's Gothic Revival brick building of 1887 (extended in 1908) cost £1,000 and was funded by J. Stone-Wigg.	
Rusthall Evangelical Church		Rusthall; 51.1391°N 0.2297°E	Evangelical	–	Registered for worship under this name in February 1993, the church is housed in a building which was originally the Ebenezer Mission Hall. Its datestone shows that it was founded in 1913.	
Rusthall United Reformed Church		Rusthall; 51.1354°N 0.2304°E	United Reformed Church	–	The first building on this site was a Wesleyan mission hall of 1894. A larger permanent church was built in 1902 and acquired by the Congregational church in 1967 when their 1861 chapel and school was demolished.	
St Nicholas' Church		Sandhurst; 51.0173°N 0.5514°E	Anglican	II*	Some 13th- and 14th-century work survives in this large, remotely sited church—especially the "impressively spacious" battlemented and buttressed tower—but R.H. Carpenter's restoration of 1875 (Note: English Heritage incorrectly attributes the restoration to his father Richard Cromwell Carpenter, who died in 1855.) transformed the building's appearance. The responds and capitals in the arcades match those at nearby Rolvenden's church.	
St Nicholas' Mission Church		Sandhurst; 51.0258°N 0.5636°E	Anglican	–	This small mission chapel within the parish of St Nicholas' Church is in the centre of Sandhurst village.	
Sandhurst Baptist Chapel		Sandhurst; 51.0227°N 0.5857°E	Baptist	II	The large chapel on the road to Rye dates from 1853 and has an adjoining schoolroom of 1899. The red-brick chapel has a four-bay by three-bay layout in which the bays are separated by pilasters of white brick. The windows are of various styles, and there is a pediment-style gable. A columned gallery survives inside.	
St Philip the Evangelist's Church		Sherwood, Royal Tunbridge Wells; 51.1449°N 0.2826°E	Anglican	–	St James's Church set up a church plant on this housing estate in 1964. The congregation moved from a school to the present building in May 1972. Called St James's Church Centre at first, it was rededicated in 1981, and was separately parished in 2004.	
Brethren Meeting Room		Sherwood, Royal Tunbridge Wells; 51.1484°N 0.2849°E	Brethren	–	This converted house, registered for marriages in 1995, can hold 120 worshippers. By 2004 its capacity was being unsustainably exceeded, so its trustees sought planning permission to open a larger meeting hall in nearby Five Oak Green. The Sherwood building was retained for some services, though.	
Holy Trinity Church		Sissinghurst; 51.1090°N 0.5635°E	Anglican	II	This was designed in 1838 by Hawkhurst-based architect J. Jennings. Another Hawkhurst man, James Reed, built it but was bankrupted by the escalating costs. Captain A. King rn and James Mann, 5th Earl Cornwallis provided money, land and the local sandstone. The church at Great Casterton, Rutland, was its model.	
Christ Church		Southborough; 51.1576°N 0.2551°E	Anglican	II	T.K. Green of the Archer & Green firm started work on this chapel of ease in 1870, but the Early English Gothic Revival building was not finished until 1889. Sandstone walls support a tiled roof with a flèche. The church cost £2,400.	
St Peter's Church		Southborough; 51.1626°N 0.2519°E	Anglican	II	The parish church of Southborough dates from 1830 to 1831 and was designed by Decimus Burton in the Early English Gothic Revival style. It was extended in 1866 and again in 1883 by Ewan Christian, who added a spire-topped tower flanked by two two-storey stair-turrets which also serve as entrance porches.	
St Thomas's Church		Southborough; 51.1622°N 0.2576°E	Anglican	II	H. Pownall designed this church in 1860–61 on a site given by Sarah Pugh. A transept was added by R.H. Garling in 1888. Decorated Gothic Revival in style, it is topped with a bellcote and has Kentish Ragstone walls.	
Bethel Chapel		Southborough; 51.1559°N 0.2590°E	Baptist	–	This simple Classical chapel has been in continuous use since 1882 by Strict Baptists. The building is stuccoed.	
New Life Church		Southborough; 51.1533°N 0.2536°E	Evangelical	–	This building received its marriage licence in November 2000. The church belongs to the Newfrontiers movement of evangelical, charismatic churches.	
Kingdom Hall		Southborough; 51.1571°N 0.2597°E	Jehovah's Witnesses	–	This Kingdom Hall is situated in a shop unit on the main road in Southborough. It is used by the Tonbridge and Tunbridge Wells Congregations of Jehovah's Witnesses.	
St John's Methodist Church		Southborough; 51.1601°N 0.2570°E	Methodist	–	This is the third Methodist chapel on the corner site facing London Road. One built in 1845 was replaced in 1871 by Cattermole and Eade's polychromatic brick church, which was demolished to make way for the present building in 1936.	
St Dunstan's Church		Southborough; 51.1605°N 0.2567°E	Roman Catholic	–	The Roman Catholic church serving Southborough was licensed for marriages in January 1963.	
St Mary the Virgin's Church		Speldhurst; 51.1511°N 0.2199°E	Anglican	II*	Variously attributed to George Gilbert Scott Jr. or his brother John Oldrid Scott, the present building of 1870–71 is the third on the site. Lightning destroyed the ancient church in 1791, and its replacement was rebuilt by Scott for £7,000. The tower was retained in the "big, strong, straightforward building", which is 13th-century in style.	
Speldhurst Chapel		Speldhurst; 51.1531°N 0.2186°E	Baptist	–	Tonbridge Baptist Church administers this small chapel in the centre of Speldhurst village. The building was altered in 2011 to give better access for disabled people.	
All Saints Church		Tudeley; 51.1866°N 0.3138°E	Anglican	I	Renovations were carried out at this medieval church in the late 18th century and in 1876, the latter by Robert Medley Fulford. More restoration took place in 1967. The "aggressive" chancel arch dates from 1885. Marc Chagall's only set of stained glass windows in England have given the church national significance.	

== Former places of worship ==
Former places of worship
Name	Image	Location	Denomination/ Affiliation	Grade	Notes	Refs
Brenchley Methodist Church		Brenchley; 51.1542°N 0.3998°E	Methodist	–	In residential use since its closure in 1964, this brick building at the north end of the village dates from 1839 in its original form. Seven years later it was extended. A record of its registration for marriages exists from July 1906.	
Broomhill Mission Church		Broomhill Bank, Speldhurst; 51.1434°N 0.2359°E	Anglican	–	A "funny little chapel" of 1878 according to a date-stone in its porch, this was a chapel of ease to Speldhurst parish church. It passed into commercial use around World War II. Built of sandstone in the Perpendicular Gothic Revival style, it retains its small spire.	
St Thomas a Becket's Church		Capel; 51.1766°N 0.3423°E	Anglican	I	Mostly Norman, but with extensive mid-13th-century wall paintings and some structural features of the 14th and 15th centuries (such as the tower and chancel arch), this former parish church near Tudeley was declared redundant in August 1986 and passed to the Churches Conservation Trust.	
Providence Chapel		Cranbrook; 51.0959°N 0.5361°E	Baptist	II*	This is, to John Newman, "one of Cranbrook's memorable buildings". Dating from 1795 and now disused, it has a seven-sided façade with five arched windows and timberwork imitating stone. Tuscan columns raise the building off the ground. A series of alterations were made in the early and late 19th centuries. There are galleries on two sides.	
Providence Chapel		Curtisden Green; 51.1375°N 0.4846°E	Baptist	–	Now a house and previously a school chapel for the adjacent Bethany School, this "model village chapel" was built for Baptists in 1878 for £700 by Miles Tully to the design of W. Theobalds. J.J. Kendon and T. Wickham were the founders. The building is of red and white brick; the stuccoed interior had a gallery.	
St Margaret's Church		East End, Benenden; 51.0865°N 0.6138°E	Anglican	–	Originally built by Gathorne Gathorne-Hardy, 1st Earl of Cranbrook (Lord Cranbrook) in 1892 as a private chapel, this became a chapel of ease to Benenden parish church in 1926. It later served as the hospital chapel of Benenden Hospital. The Early English Gothic Revival building is of red and grey brick and tiles.	
St Luke's Mission Church		Five Oak Green; 51.1834°N 0.3580°E	Anglican	–	St Luke's was a mission chapel in the parish of Capel. The brick building was redeveloped for housing after the congregation moved into the village's former Congregational chapel (now the United Church).	
Capel Congregational Chapel		Five Oak Green; 51.1843°N 0.3584°E	Congregational	–	Now rebuilt as a house following a period of disuse, this brick and stucco chapel with pointed-arched windows was erected in 1869 at a cost of £400, but was succeeded by the present United Church in 1925 because railway noise affected services. It had been extended in 1876.	
Providence Chapel		Frittenden; 51.1400°N 0.5965°E	Baptist	II	The chapel, which has one storey and is linked to a taller house, is now in residential use. Architectural features include casement and sash windows, red-brick walls, a gabled slate roof and a hood-moulded doorcase.	
Frittenden Bethel Chapel		Frittenden; 51.1381°N 0.6017°E	Assemblies of God	–	This small building was registered with this name in February 1945 for the use of the Assemblies of God denomination. A planning application for residential conversion was made by the chapel trustees in November 1999, and it is now a cottage.	
Goudhurst Methodist Chapel		Goudhurst; 51.1152°N 0.4605°E	Methodist	–	London architect W. Ranger's Vernacular-style red-brick building of 1878 superseded an adjacent chapel of 1836, which became a Sunday school. The windows are arched and have yellow brick surrounds. The chapel closed in the early 21st century.	
Goudhurst Primitive Methodist Chapel		Goudhurst; 51.1149°N 0.4687°E	Methodist	–	Built in the mid-19th century to replace a "preaching house" of the 18th century, this simple brick and stone chapel passed into residential use after its closure in the late 1930s following the merger of Primitive Methodism into the wider Methodist Church of Great Britain.	
All Saints Church		Hawkhurst; 51.0469°N 0.5124°E	Anglican	II	Described as a "fine landmark" with a "conspicuous southeast spire", Hawkhurst's second Anglican church (built in 1861 by George Gilbert Scott) declined and was closed in the 1990s. It was funded by the vicar of St Laurence's Church as a centrally located chapel of ease. During 2019–2020, extensive sympathetic refurbishments were completed, converting the property into private apartments.	
Ebenezer Strict Baptist Chapel		Hawkhurst; 51.0479°N 0.5097°E	Baptist	–	This Strict Baptist chapel, aligned with the Gospel Standard movement, closed temporarily during World War II and permanently in the late 20th century. It is a red-brick and stone Vernacular-style building with a tiled roof, erected by local builders Warburton and Vinden in 1872–73.	
Hawkhurst Methodist Church		Hawkhurst; 51.0445°N 0.5085°E	Methodist	–	Thomas Elworthy, a prolific Nonconformist church designer of St Leonards-on-Sea, produced this lightly Gothic red-brick, stone and slate chapel for Hawkhurst's Wesleyan Methodists. There are side buttresses and lancet windows. The church closed in 2010 and the congregation now worships elsewhere.	
Holden Park Gospel Hall		Southborough; 51.1554°N 0.2564°E	Brethren	–	This Open Brethren meeting room was licensed for marriages in March 1985 but was deregistered in September 2012.	
Horsmonden Baptist Chapel		Horsmonden; 51.1605°N 0.4467°E	Baptist	–	Located distant from the village at Bramble Street, and "sensitively converted" into a house in the 1980s, this was used as a church from 1889 until 1971. It is a red- and white-brick Vernacular building with lancet-style windows. The founder was Robert Burr.	
Kilndown Wesleyan Chapel		Kilndown; 51.0895°N 0.4255°E	Methodist	–	The first chapel on the site was built in 1835 but demolished 50 years later to allow the present simple brick building to be erected at a cost of £650. It has lost its apsidal end, having been converted into a shop and subsequently a house. It was registered for marriages between May 1903 and January 1961.	
Lamberhurst Methodist Church		Lamberhurst; 51.0983°N 0.3895°E	Methodist	–	A combined school and chapel on this site dates from 1882 and was still in use until the late 1930s.	
Primitive Methodist (Ranters) Chapel		Lamberhurst; 51.0984°N 0.3898°E	Methodist	–	Now a garage, this "curious" small building was built for Primitive Methodists. A record of its licensing for marriages exists from August 1938.	
Langton Wesleyan Chapel		Langton Green; 51.1316°N 0.2113°E	Methodist	–	Built of polychromatic brick and slate in 1871, this Wesleyan chapel closed during the 1940s and became a cottage, which it remains, in 1954. The original gabled front porch has been retained.	
Rehoboth Baptist Chapel		Mount Sion, Royal Tunbridge Wells; 51.1267°N 0.2601°E	Baptist	–	A Classical-style stuccoed chapel with arched windows and a pediment, this dates from 1851 and was in religious use until the 1980s, after which it was sold for commercial use.	
Kingdom Hall		Mount Sion, Royal Tunbridge Wells; 51.1273°N 0.2597°E	Jehovah's Witnesses	–	This ground-floor section of a former hotel near Tunbridge Wells railway station was registered for use by Jehovah's Witnesses between 1945 and May 1956.	
Vale Royal Methodist Church		Mount Sion, Royal Tunbridge Wells; 51.1287°N 0.2616°E	Methodist	–	Charles Bell's expensively built church (it cost £5,000 in 1872–73) replaced a Wesleyan chapel of 1812. The new building is in the Early French Gothic Revival style and combines Kentish Ragstone and Bath Stone. Pinnacles flank the gabled slate roof. Substantial renovations were carried out in 1981–82, funded by the sale of a former Primitive Methodist chapel in Camden Road, but Vale Royal closed at Easter 2015 and the congregation moved to Tunbridge Wells United Reformed Church on Mount Ephraim and now share that building. Vale Royal's registration for worship and solemnising marriages was formally cancelled in April 2018.	
Mount Sion Chapel		Mount Sion, Royal Tunbridge Wells; 51.1273°N 0.2615°E	Presbyterian	–	Presbyterians met for worship regularly but "with considerable difficulty" in the early 18th century until their permanent chapel was opened on 1 August 1720. It declined in the early 19th century and was closed after a brief period of Wesleyan use. Independents acquired and refurbished it in 1830, but the Mount Pleasant chapel succeeded it. The building is now an office.	
Paddock Wood Wesleyan Chapel		Paddock Wood; 51.1793°N 0.3873°E	Methodist	–	After St Andrew's Anglican church was wrecked by bombs in 1940, Anglicans and Methodists shared this chapel until a new St Andrew's Church was built. Both groups then moved in there, and this simple red-brick building with pointed-arched windows (built for £640 in 1888, and registered for marriages in 1891) was sold.	
Pembury Wesleyan Church		Pembury; 51.1414°N 0.3269°E	Methodist	–	S.W. Haughton designed a new chapel for Pembury's Wesleyans in 1884. Built by G. and F. Penn for £800, it replaced a nearby chapel of 1835. Courses of coloured brick make up the Gothic Revival façade. It was deregistered in 1967. Between July 1973 and February 1980 the chapel was reregistered for worship by members of the Subud movement, who later moved to a new place of worship in Royal Tunbridge Wells. The building is now a house.	
Mount Pleasant Congregational Church		Royal Tunbridge Wells; 51.1335°N 0.2630°E	Congregational	II*	Jabez Scholes may have been the original architect of this large Classical-style chapel, erected for £3,700 in 1845–48. The Tuscan portico at the front cost a further £1,400 in 1866. Acquired by Pentecostals in 1977, it was sold three years later and turned into shops.	
Albion Road Congregational Church		Royal Tunbridge Wells; 51.1383°N 0.2711°E	Congregational	–	John Sulman's Decorated Gothic Revival design was executed in 1873 at a cost of £2,600, providing Royal Tunbridge Wells with a second Congregational chapel. Religious use continued until about 1929, after which its many uses included an anti-aircraft base during World War II.	
Bible Mission Hall		Royal Tunbridge Wells; 51.1409°N 0.2579°E	Non-denominational	–	The Domestic-style stuccoed building of 1873 is most distinctive for its double porch. It became the parish hall of St John's Church, a studio and latterly a British Red Cross hall. An early pastor arranged eclectic activities such as the Bible Handcart Mission, the Gospel Tents Mission and the Wayside Words Gospel Leaflet Mission.	
Grosvenor Mission		Royal Tunbridge Wells; 51.1367°N 0.2627°E	Non-denominational	–	Now in commercial use, this hall was used for worship for a short time in the mid-20th century: its worship certification was annulled in October 1960.	
Holy Trinity Church		Royal Tunbridge Wells; 51.1328°N 0.2622°E	Anglican	II*	Decimus Burton unusually adopted the Perpendicular Gothic Revival style for this church of 1827–29, which cost £10,591. It was the town's first parish church, but decline set in and it closed in the 1970s. Demolition was scheduled in 1975, but it was bought and turned into a theatre and arts centre in the early 1980s.	
Christian Science Church		Royal Tunbridge Wells; 51.1455°N 0.2601°E	Christian Scientist	–	Cecil Burns' distinctive, original and large circular concrete-framed building served as a church from its construction in 1931 until 1959, when it was sold to become offices. The "highly interesting" structure was described as a "uniquely literal transcription of Perret's Beaux-Arts planning".	
Down Lane Primitive Methodist Chapel		Royal Tunbridge Wells; 51.1416°N 0.2593°E	Methodist	–	An eventful history since 1874 comprises ten years of Primitive Methodist use; occupation by Congregationalists from 1884 (as a mission hall linked to the Mount Pleasant church); conversion into a storeroom; a reversion to religious use as the Glad Tidings Hall by the Assemblies of God; and another change of use in 1979, to an antiques shop. The brick building has lancet windows.	
Chapel		Sandhurst; 51.0253°N 0.5587°E		II	Described by English Heritage as a "former Nonconformist chapel" of the 18th century, this weatherboarded building has been converted into a storehouse. There is also some brickwork, and the roof is tiled. Surviving elements include some original windows and parts of the gallery inside.	
Collins Memorial Methodist Chapel		Sandhurst; 51.0265°N 0.5657°E	Methodist	–	Now a house, this building was erected and registered for the purposes of Wesleyan Methodist worship.	
Sissinghurst Methodist Church		Sissinghurst; 51.1089°N 0.5615°E	Methodist	–	After falling out of religious use in the 1970s—it was deregistered for marriages in October 1971—this centrally located chapel was sold in 1981 and became a house. The red- and white-brick building has three pointed-arched windows and locally made tiles on the roof.	
Jehovah Jireh Baptist Church		Walnut Tree, Brenchley; 51.1511°N 0.3815°E	Baptist	II	Little is known about this weatherboarded chapel, which was "said to have been built for one of the Baptist groups" in the early 20th century in a much older Gothic Revival style. The windows have triangular and diamond-shaped elements, and the slate roof is gabled. An adjacent cottage is in the same style.	

== Bibliography ==
- Colbran, John (1840). Phippen, James (ed.). Colbran's New Guide for Tunbridge Wells. Tunbridge Wells: John Colbran.
- Homan, Roger (1984). The Victorian Churches of Kent. Chichester: Phillimore & Co. ISBN 0-85033-466-7.
- Newman, John (1969). West Kent and the Weald. Buildings of England (1st ed.). Harmondsworth: Penguin Books. ISBN 978-0-300-09614-9.
- Savidge, Alan (1995) [1975]. Royal Tunbridge Wells – A History of a Spa Town. Revised by Charlie Bell (Revised 2nd ed.). Speldhurst: Oast Books. ISBN 1-898594-10-4.
- Thomson, J. Radford (1883). Pelton's Illustrated Guide to Tunbridge Wells and the Neighbouring Seats, Towns and Villages (10th ed.). Tunbridge Wells: Richard Pelton.
