= Bethany School =

Bethany School may refer to:

- Bethany School (Glendale, Ohio), United States
- Bethany School, Goudhurst, Kent, England
