= Trinity Theatre =

Theatre and arts center in Royal Tunbridge Wells, Kent, England

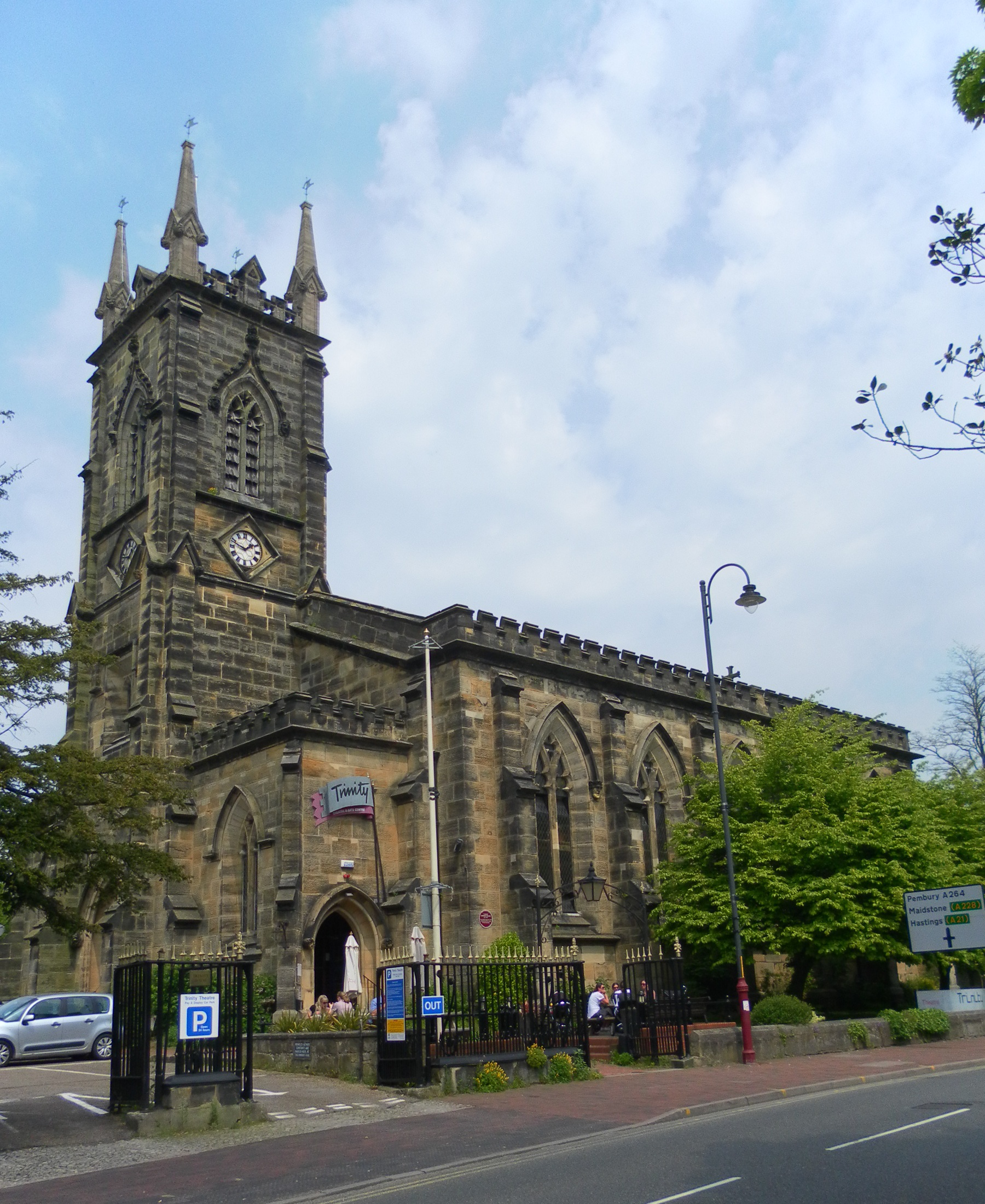
- Trinity Theatre

- Location of the Trinity Theatre, Tunbridge Wells within Kent
- Address: Church Road; Tunbridge Wells; England
- Coordinates: 51.132838°N 0.262207°E
- Owner: Diocese of Rochester
- Operator: Trinity Theatre
- Capacity: 279
- Type: Provincial
- Current use: Theatre, Arts centre

Construction
- Opened: 1829
- Reopened: 1982
- Years active: 1982-present
- Architect: Decimus Burton

Tenant
- Royal Tunbridge Wells Civic Society

Website
- http://www.trinitytheatre.net

Trinity Theatre is a theatre and arts centre, located in the former Holy Trinity Church in the centre of Royal Tunbridge Wells, Kent.

== Holy Trinity Church: 1829–1972 ==
As a developing spa town, Tunbridge Wells was short of church capacity, and had no parish church. In 1818, the Church Commissioners created a fund to provide new churches in growing towns, for which it was decided by the residents and visitors to the town to apply for. Led by Lord Abergavenny, a subscription fund was started, which raised the £10,591 construction costs. Architect Decimus Burton (1800–1881), who had already been commissioned to design villas in Calverley Park, agreed to design the building, to a then popular Gothic Revival architecture style. Built in locally quarried sandstone from Calverley Quarry, the first stone was laid on 17 August 1827. Constructed by Mr Barrett of Tunbridge Wells, the finished church, which cost just over £12,000 to complete including fitting out, was consecrated in September 1829.

Due to the popularity of Tunbridge Wells in the Victorian age, a number of churches were built in the town. Hence following the fall in congregation numbers after World War II, the town had a number of churches which were in great need of major maintenance. As the largest church in the town, it was decided to decommission it. The church held its last religious service in 1972.

== Derelict: 1973-1981 ==
In 1974 the Church Commissioners declared Holy Trinity "redundant to pastoral needs," thereby allowing for its potential demolition, and redevelopment of the site as housing or offices. However, after a petition was raised by the Royal Tunbridge Wells Civic Society, the commissioners gave the society one year to find a suitable public use for the building. After approving in principle a plan to turn the building into a community theatre and arts centre in 1976, £50,000 was raised in six months, to allow a long term lease to be agreed from January 1977 with the Diocese of Rochester.

== Trinity Theatre: 1982-present ==
Supported by Tunbridge Wells Borough Council (£15,000), Kent County Council and Arts Council England, over a five-year period the internal redevelopment addressed dry rot and damaged stonework, to turn the building into a theatre with 350 raked seats.

Subsequent grants have allowed developments to include a cafeteria, public bar, and redevelopment of the side vestibules to allow for art shows and local arts classes. In March 1996 an application was approved by the National Lottery for £600,000 of additional internal improvements, which provided a computerised box office, new seats, and an access ramp for wheelchair users.

Since its redevelopment as a theatre, Trinity Theatre has hosted around 350 events annually, including theatre, dance, comedy, music, film, and visual arts. It has collaborated with performers and organisations including Steven Berkoff and the Royal National Theatre, and has hosted international performing arts events. The theatre receives approximately 90,000 visitors each year, with some audiences travelling from South East London.

=== Tunbridge Wells Theatre Club ===
Originally launched in 1946 as the Tunbridge Wells Drama Club, after the church became available in 1977, the club and its committee became central to the building's revival. After the restoration of the building in 1982, it renamed itself as Trinity Theatre Club. Today it is one of the most active amateur theatre clubs in the South East, staging three productions each year.

== See also ==
- List of places of worship in Tunbridge Wells (borough)
