= St Mark's Church, Royal Tunbridge Wells =

St. Mark's Church
- Church of St. Mark
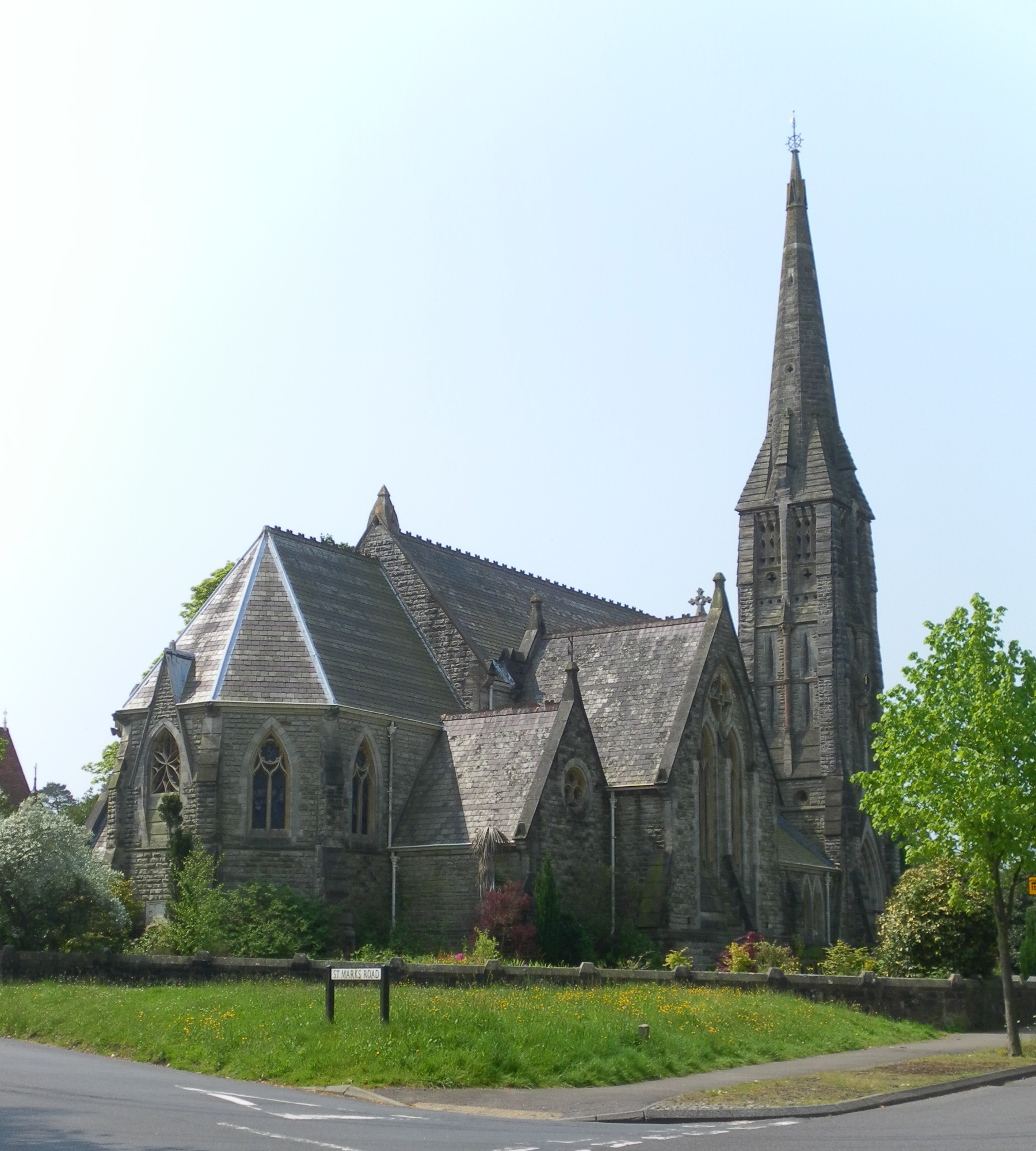
- St. Mark's Church
- St. Mark's Church
- 51.11571°N 0.25170°E
- OS grid reference: TQ5770037568
- Location: Royal Tunbridge Wells
- Country: England
- Denomination: Anglican
- Website: St. Mark's Church

History
- Status: parish church
- Founder: Earl of Abergavenny
- Dedication: St. Mark
- Consecrated: 1866

Architecture
- Functional status: Active
- Heritage designation: Grade II*
- Designated: 7 June 1996
- Architect: Robert Lewis Roumieu
- Architectural type: Late Gothic Revival
- Style: French Gothic
- Groundbreaking: 1864
- Completed: 1866

Specifications
- Materials: Stone

Administration
- Province: Canterbury
- Diocese: Rochester
- Deanery: Tunbridge Wells
- Parish: Broadwater Down

St. Mark's Church is the Church of England parish church for the Broadwater Down area of Royal Tunbridge Wells, Kent, England, in the Diocese of Rochester. Built in the 19th-century Gothic Revival style by Robert Lewis Roumieu, it is a Grade II* listed building.

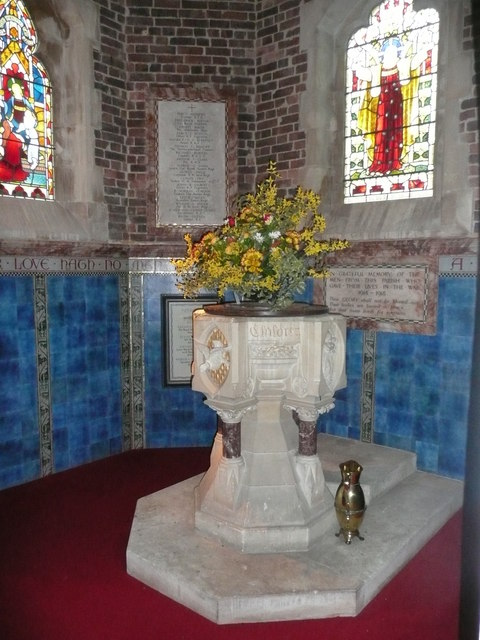
The Caen stone font and some of the stained glass

== History ==
St. Mark's Church was built as the result of personal intervention from William Nevill, 4th Earl of Abergavenny. He had begun developing a section of the Abergavenny Estate with residential mansions, but late in the process he determined to build a church and parsonage at his own expense, which reduced the number of mansions ultimately built to 46. The church was funded by the 4th Earl, and designed by architect Robert Lewis Roumieu. Construction began in 1864 after the laying of the foundation stone by the Countess of Abergavenny. It was consecrated in 1866. The parish was created in 1867 from Holy Trinity, Eridge Green, in the Diocese of Chichester. It was transferred to the Diocese of Rochester in 1991.

== Design ==
The church was designed in the French Gothic style of Late Gothic Revival architecture. It was built using stone from the Earl of Abergavenny's own quarries and Bath stone for the carvings. The spire is 130 feet high. Inside, the font and pulpit were made from Caen stone. Its stained glass windows were installed as a memorial to the Earl when he died and depict the four major prophets and the Four Evangelists. Roumieu was given freedom in his design of the building, which was referred to by Building News as "acrobatic gothic".

The church also has a set of chimes and bells installed in the clock tower. They were funded by public donations in commemoration of the Diamond Jubilee of Queen Victoria and were first used in 1898. In 2005, the chimes were stopped in order to carry out repairs and were due to be restarted in September 2012 however this was delayed due to concerns from local residents.

== Usage ==
The church is used for regular Sunday services and has also been used to host fund-raising concerts. It was the venue for the 2009 wedding of former Casualty actress Rebekah Gibbs.

== See also ==
- List of places of worship in Tunbridge Wells (borough)
