= Curtisden Green =

Hamlet in Kent, England

Coordinates: 51.1371°N 0.4929°E

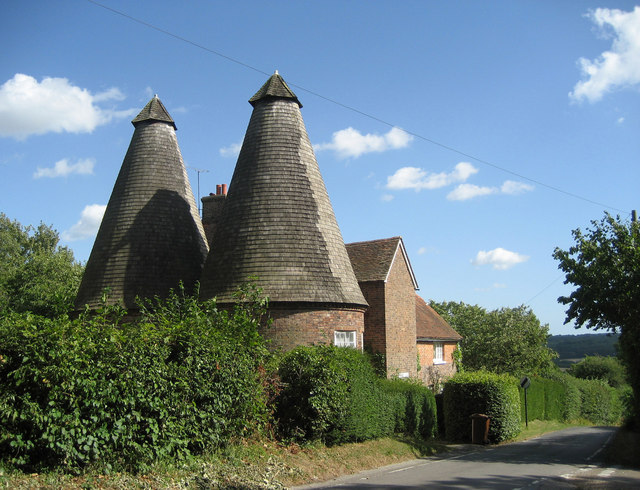
- Oast houses on Curtisden Green Lane

- Location within Kent
- OS grid reference: TQ745405
- District: Tunbridge Wells
- Shire county: Kent
- Region: South East
- Country: England
- Sovereign state: United Kingdom
- Post town: Cranbrook
- Postcode district: TN17
- Police: Kent
- Fire: Kent
- Ambulance: South East Coast
- UK Parliament: Tunbridge Wells

Curtisden Green is a hamlet, lying 3 miles (4.8 km) to the north of Goudhurst, Kent, England. It is the location of Bethany School.
