= Vale Royal Methodist Church =

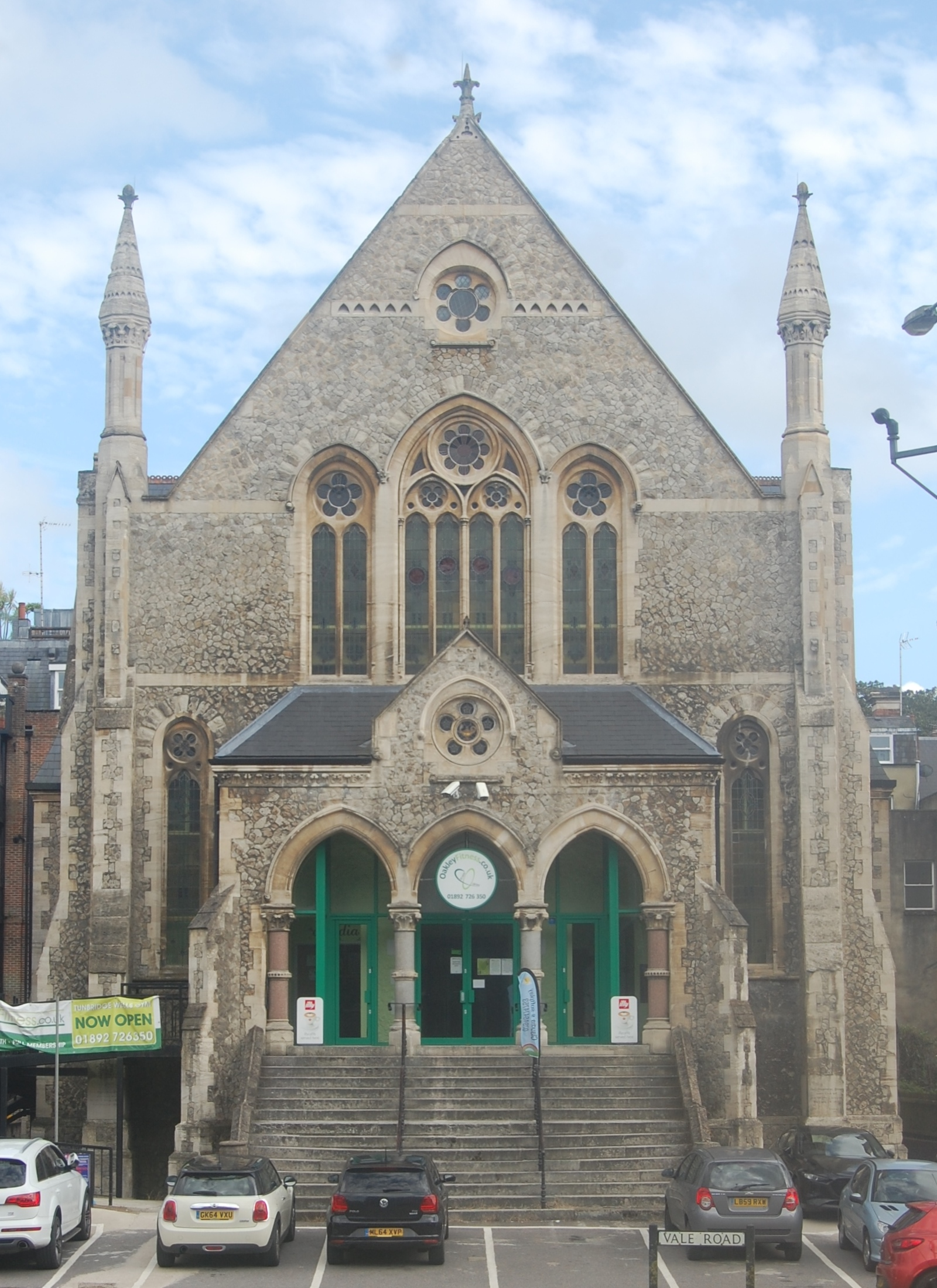
- The former chapel in August 2021, following its conversion into a gymnasium
- Vale Royal Methodist Church
- 51.1287°N 0.2616°E
- OS grid reference: TQ 58346 39034
- Location: Royal Tunbridge Wells, Kent
- Country: England
- Denomination: Methodist Church of Great Britain

History
- Former name: Vale Royal Wesleyan Methodist Church

Architecture
- Functional status: Closed
- Heritage designation: Local heritage asset
- Architect: Charles Bell
- Completed: 3 June 1873
- Construction cost: £5,000
- Closed: 5 April 2015

Vale Royal Methodist Church, also historically Vale Royal Chapel and Vale Royal Wesleyan Methodist Church, was a Methodist Church of Great Britain parish church in Royal Tunbridge Wells, Kent, England. It was opened in 1873 and stopped being used as a church on Easter 2015. It was later renovated to become a gym.

== History ==
The founder of Methodism, John Wesley, visited Tunbridge Wells in his early years as a preacher and gained a small congregation there. Meetings initially took place in the Presbyterian chapel at Little Mount Sion, which had opened in 1721; Wesley preached there "on several occasions". The congregation of the Wesleyan Methodist Church purchased land on what is now Vale Road for a small chapel in 1812 and worshipped in an inclusive way by also using Church of England liturgy during Sunday morning services by 1863. Due to the growth of the congregation, they expanded the original chapel twice, but eventually required larger premises. Work began in 1872 and the church opened on 3 June 1873 at a cost of £5,000. It was built to designs by the architect Charles Bell and was built by the firm of Willicombe and Oakley. The church's organ was installed in 1883 and was opened by William Thomas Best. In the 1930s, the majority of Vale Royal's stained glass windows were installed.

== Closure ==
Due to the cost of maintenance of the church building, the Vale Royal congregation had proposed demolition and rebuilding of the church with 14 flats on the site in 2010. However this proposal was rejected the following year by Tunbridge Wells Borough Council as "out of character" with the local area. Eventually the congregation put the church up for sale, but the council noted that though the church was not a listed building, it was a local heritage asset. The church held its last service on Easter Day in 2015 before closing and the Methodist congregation moved to worship at a nearby United Reformed Church. The church eventually sold at auction for £900,000 in 2016, however the money went to the Methodist Church's headquarters and not the local congregation. The church was later adapted into a gym with the building kept standing. Vale Royal's licence to conduct marriages and Christian worship services within it, which was granted on 17 July 1873, was formally revoked in 2018.

== Architecture ==
Charles Bell, a London-based architect, designed Vale Royal Methodist Church in a style described as "early French Gothic [Revival]" or as Perpendicular Gothic Revival. It is of local Kentish ragstone laid in the form of random polygonal masonry, and there are dressings of paler Bath stone. The roof is laid with slate tiles. The gabled façade has corner buttresses which rise to form tall finials or pinnacles, and there is tracery in the windows. The entrance porch is "raised high above street level" and has a triple archway.

== See also ==
- List of places of worship in Tunbridge Wells (borough)
- Media related to Vale Royal Methodist Church, Tunbridge Wells at Wikimedia Commons

== Bibliography ==
- Homan, Roger (1984). The Victorian Churches of Kent. Chichester: Phillimore & Co. Ltd. ISBN 0-85033-466-7.
- Stell, Christopher (2002). Nonconformist Chapels and Meeting-houses in Eastern England. Swindon: English Heritage. ISBN 1-873592-50-7.
