= Milner Square =

Garden square in Islington, London, England

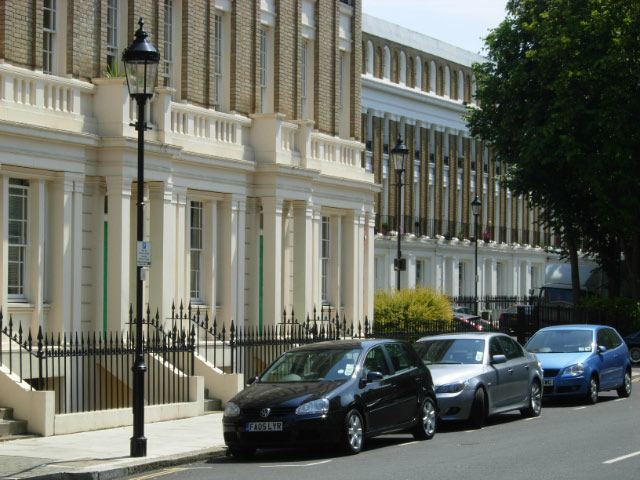
- Milner Square, north eastern corner. Reconstructed buildings in the foreground show the original appearance of the square

- Location within London Borough of Islington
- Postal code: N1
- Coordinates: 51°32′24″N 00°06′19″W

Construction
- Construction start: 1841
- Completion: Early 1850s

Milner Square is a garden square in the Barnsbury district of Islington, North London. It is bounded by early Victorian terraced houses, which are all listed buildings. Historic England describes it as "important for the radical logic of its design, of a type rarely seen outside Scotland and the North, and unlike anything in London."

== History ==
Thomas Milner Gibson was a Member of Parliament, President of the Board of Trade, supporter of the free-trade movement and a leading anti-Corn Laws orator. In 1823 Milner Gibson leased land in Islington from local landowner William Tufnell, and his estate surveyor and architect Francis Edwards laid out an estate between 1828 and 1846. The plot formed Theberton Street, the two neighbouring squares Milner Square and Gibson Square, and some smaller streets. On Edwards' original plans "Milner Square" and "Gibson Square" were at that point reversed.

Milner Square was designed by architects Robert Lewis Roumieu and Alexander Dick Gough, and work began on the east side in 1841 and was completed in 1844. Roumieu's original plan included a large Greek-style church at the centre of the west side, 60 ft (18 m) wide, to accommodate a congregation of 1,000. The church plan did not proceed, and the west side of the square was completed about 1850 as a copy of the east side.

The square was initially occupied by prosperous middle class tradesmen and professionals. As with much of Islington, in the middle and late 19th century Barnsbury was gradually abandoned by the middle classes who were replaced by poorer occupants. Starting in 1856, Islington's Medical Officer of Health Dr Edward Ballard published annual reports into public health in Islington, and noted unsanitary conditions in many locations with "mortality from tubercular diseases" and "zymotic mortality" in Milner Square from 1857. Charles Booth’s poverty map of c.1890 still shows most Milner Square households as "Fairly comfortable. Good ordinary earnings".

In the first half of the 20th century the square, as with much of Islington and its population, became impoverished. Between the world wars and for some time afterwards, houses were tenemented by absentee landlords and often let in single rooms, and by the 1950s the effect was of unrelieved gloom. The run down buildings were purchased by Islington Council in 1973 and restored and converted into council flats, completed in 1977 at a cost of £2 1/2 million. Many of the square's previous inhabitants were relocated to housing estates and New Towns; their memories of life in the square were collected in a 2015 documentary film, Through The Hole In The Wall: Milner Square 1935-75.

== Description ==
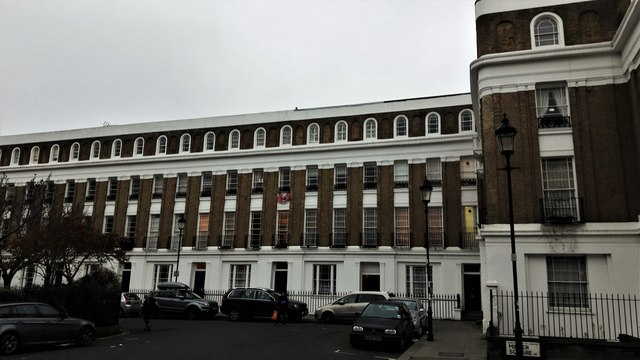
Milner Square, southeast corner, showing the uniform theme and "The Hole In The Wall"

The square was completed to a single design, resulting in a uniform theme on all sides which also wraps around the corners into Milner Place. Unusually for an Islington development at this time, building was completed by a single builder, William Spencer Dove, founder of Dove Brothers Ltd, who were a Barnsbury-based construction company from 1781 to 1993. The square has a continuous terrace of houses with no features to break up the terrace; even the chimney stacks are hidden from view. Strong vertical lines on the four-storeyed façades are emphasised by tall narrow windows.

Due to its location behind a botanic garden which was not part of Milner Gibson's land the square could not be accessed by road from Upper Street, and so at no. 20 a passage in place of the front door gives pedestrian access to Almeida Street. This passage was, and still is, known locally as "The Hole In The Wall".

The original pilasters on the entrances, and the balustraded cornices, were removed in the 1930s because they darkened the ground floor rooms. The pilasters have since been partially restored, and the overhanging features and pilasters replaced on nos. 1–4, which is a 1970s reconstruction.

The architectural historian Christopher Hussey described Milner Square as "most remarkable of Barnsbury squares", "surprising", of "monumental" unity, and "remarkable plastic quality". Hussey also thought that "though for residential purposes, Milner Square is somewhat gloomy and monotonous owing to its complete suppression of the individual unit, there is no denying its impressiveness".

However, the design of the buildings has been criticised. Sir John Summerson described the architecture as "perfectly extraordinary", "of the most sinister description", "unreal and tortured", which "it is possible to visit. . . many times and still not be absolutely certain that you have seen it anywhere but in an unhappy dream." Sir Nikolaus Pevsner thought it demonstrated a "disintegration of the classical conventions...naked, in sheer harshness and negation of harmonious proportions".

The council's 1977 restoration and cleaning has restored much of the horizontality intended by the architects, counteracting the verticals. Removal of a century's accumulation of dirt has restored much of the square's original grand appearance.

By the 1920s the centre of the square had become a vegetable garden. It has been a playground for many years since then, and was substantially renovated by Islington Council in 2018.

== Notable residents ==
- Alexander Kennedy Isbister (1822–1883), educator and educational writer, died at no. 20
- Patrick Kavanagh (1904–1967), Irish poet and novelist
