= High Brooms railway station =

Railway station in Kent, England

High Brooms
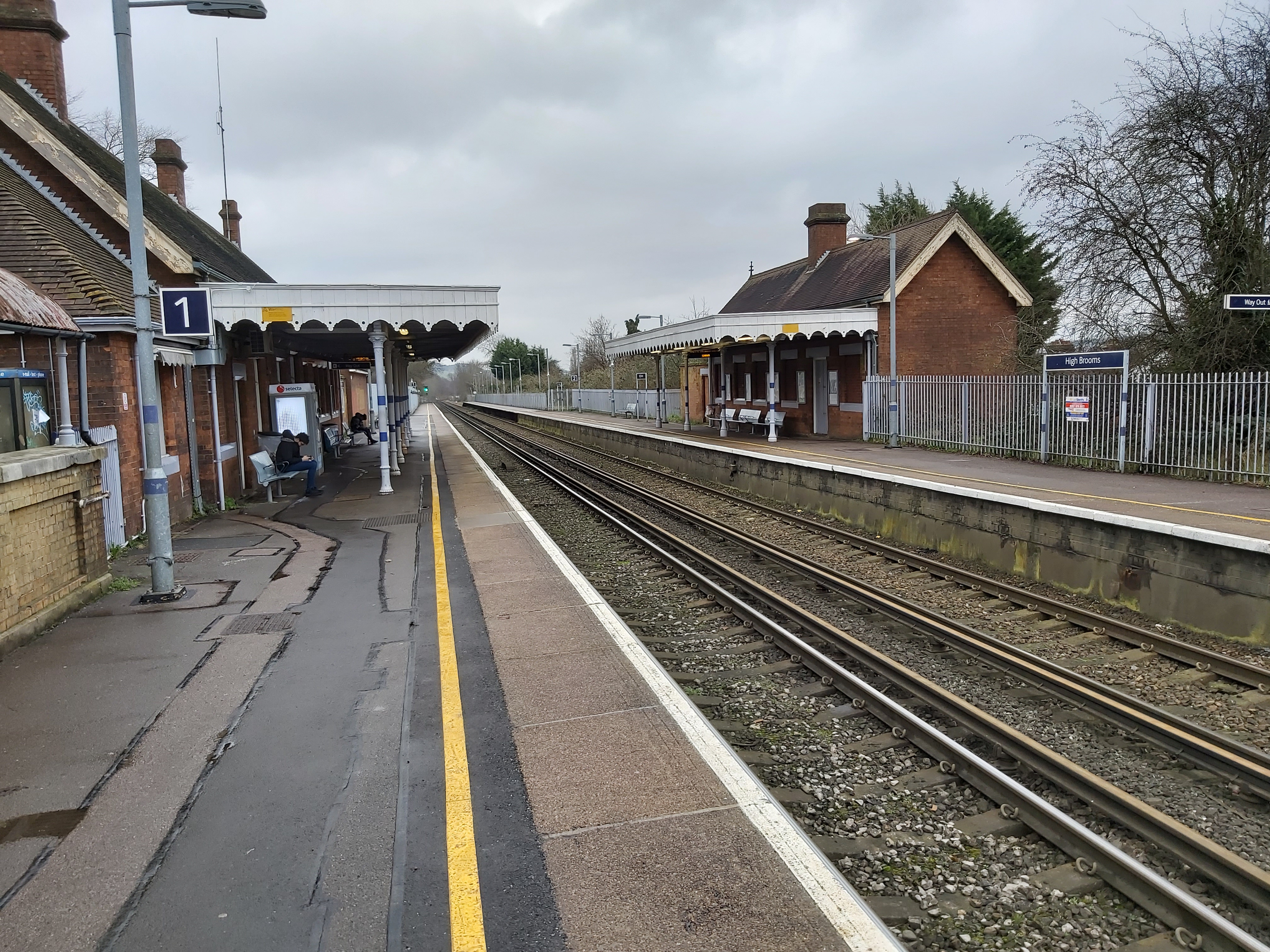

General information
- Location: Tunbridge Wells, Tunbridge Wells; England
- Coordinates: 51.149°N 0.277°E
- Grid reference: TQ592413
- Manager: Southeastern
- Platforms: 2

Other information
- Station code: HIB
- Classification: DfT category D

History
- Opened: 1893
- Original company: South Eastern Railway
- Pre-grouping: South Eastern and Chatham Railway
- Post-grouping: Southern Railway

Key dates
- 1 March 1893: Opened as Southborough
- 21 September 1925: Renamed High Brooms

Passengers
- 2020/21: ▼0.292 million
- 2021/22: ▲0.776 million
- 2022/23: ▲0.924 million
- 2023/24: ▲1.024 million
- 2024/25: ▲1.149 million
Location
Notes
- Passenger statistics from the Office of Rail and Road

High Brooms railway station is on the Hastings line in the south of England and serves High Brooms and Southborough in the borough of Tunbridge Wells, Kent. It is 32 miles 70 chains (52.9 km) down the line from London Charing Cross. The station and all trains serving it are operated by Southeastern.

== History ==
High Brooms was originally opened in 1893 as Southborough by the South Eastern Railway; it acquired its present name in 1925. It is situated on a five-mile gradient from Tonbridge to the north of the station. The main station buildings are on the northbound platform. There is a closed waiting room on the southbound platform. Access to the southbound platform is via stairs from a side entrance, and access to the northbound platform is at street level. A subway links the two platforms.

== Services ==
All services at High Brooms are operated by Southeastern using Class 375, 465 and 466 EMUs.

The typical off-peak service in trains per hour is:

- 2 tph to London Charing Cross
- 2 tph to Hastings (1 semi-fast, 1 stopping)

Additional services, including trains to and from London Cannon Street and Ore, and extra trains between Charing Cross and Tunbridge Wells call at the station in the peak hours.

Preceding station	National Rail	Following station
Tonbridge	Southeastern Hastings Line	Tunbridge Wells
	Historical railways	
Tonbridge	British Rail Southern Region Cuckoo Line	Tunbridge Wells Central
