= Robert Lewis Roumieu =

English architect (1814–1877)

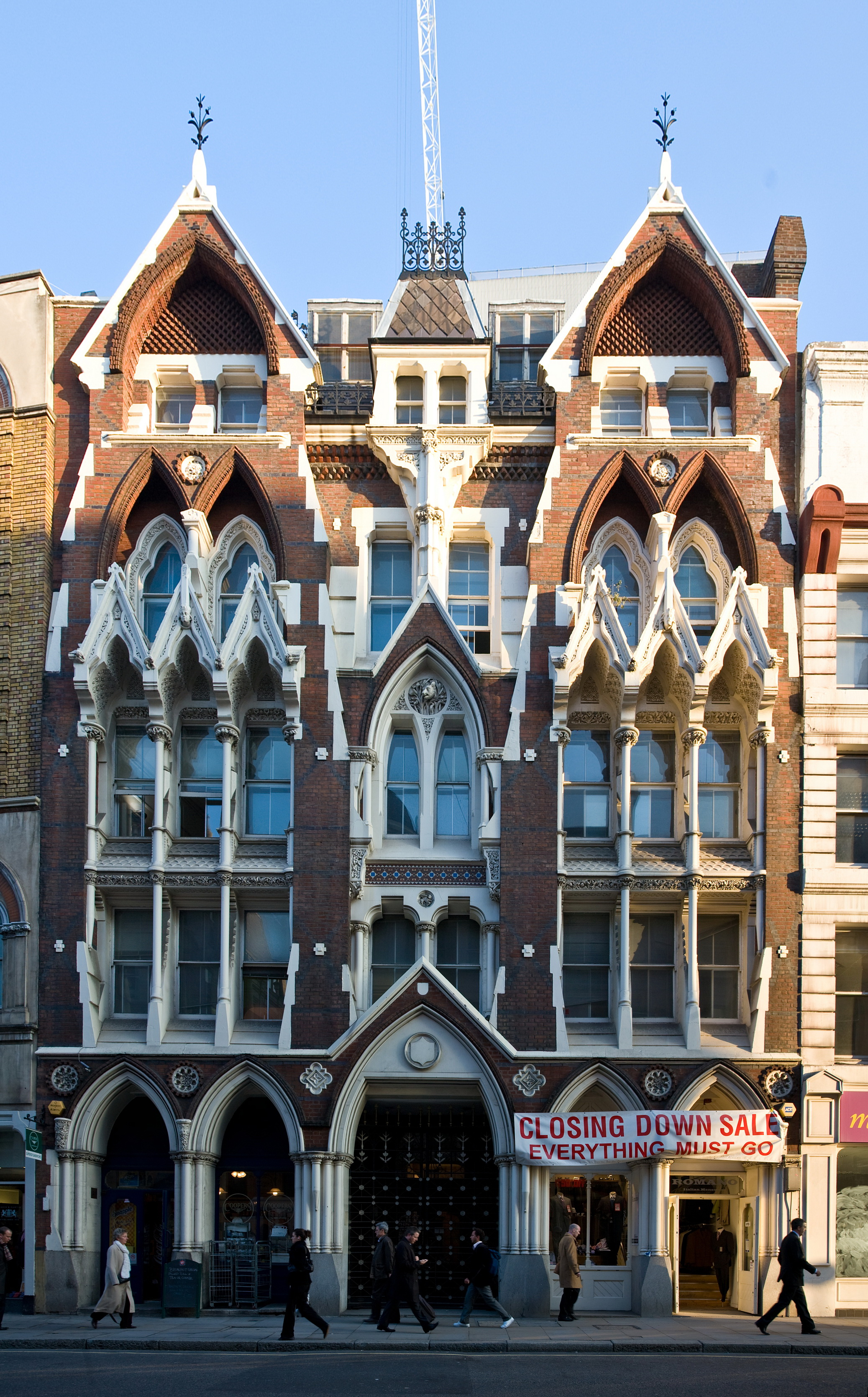
Roumieu's best-known building. The two distinctive high gables make 33–35 Eastcheap instantly recognisable as "one of the maddest displays in London of Victorian Gothic"

Robert Lewis Roumieu (1814 – 1877) otherwise R.L. Roumieu, was a 19th-century English architect whose designs include Milner Square in Islington and an idiosyncratic vinegar warehouse at 33–35 Eastcheap in the City of London. A pupil of Benjamin Dean Wyatt, he worked in partnership with Alexander Dick Gough between 1836 and 1848.

== Life and career ==
Roumieu was of Huguenot descent and his middle name is occasionally spelled "Louis". The Roumieu family originated from Languedoc, and the name has been listed among those of Huguenot refugees who settled in Great Britain and Ireland during the reign of Louis XIV (1643–1714). Roumieu's father John was a solicitor, while his grandfather Abraham Roumieu (1734–1780) had been an architect.

Roumieu was articled to the architect Benjamin Dean Wyatt in 1831. In 1836 he went into partnership with another pupil of Wyatt, Alexander Dick Gough. Together they completed some notable projects in what are now the London Boroughs of Camden and Islington, including Milner Square and the Islington Literary and Philosophical Institute (now the Almeida Theatre), a stuccoed classical work of 1837. The partnership was dissolved in 1848.

On 15 December 1845 Roumieu was elected a Fellow of the Royal Institute of British Architects (FRIBA), having been proposed by HL Keys, EM Foxhall, and HE Kendall.

For 22 years Roumieu's address was 10 Lancaster Place, Strand, London (1845–77). Prior to that he was at 8 Regent's Square, St Pancras, London (1845) and after that period at 7 St George's Terrace, Regent's Park, London, until his death in 1877. He is buried in a family vault on the western side of Highgate Cemetery near the grave of Samuel Sanders Teulon.

== Works ==
=== Milner Square, Islington ===
Roumieu and Gough's Milner Square, Islington, has been taken as "an early example of his [Roumieu's] talent for strangeness and distortion."

=== 33–35 Eastcheap ===
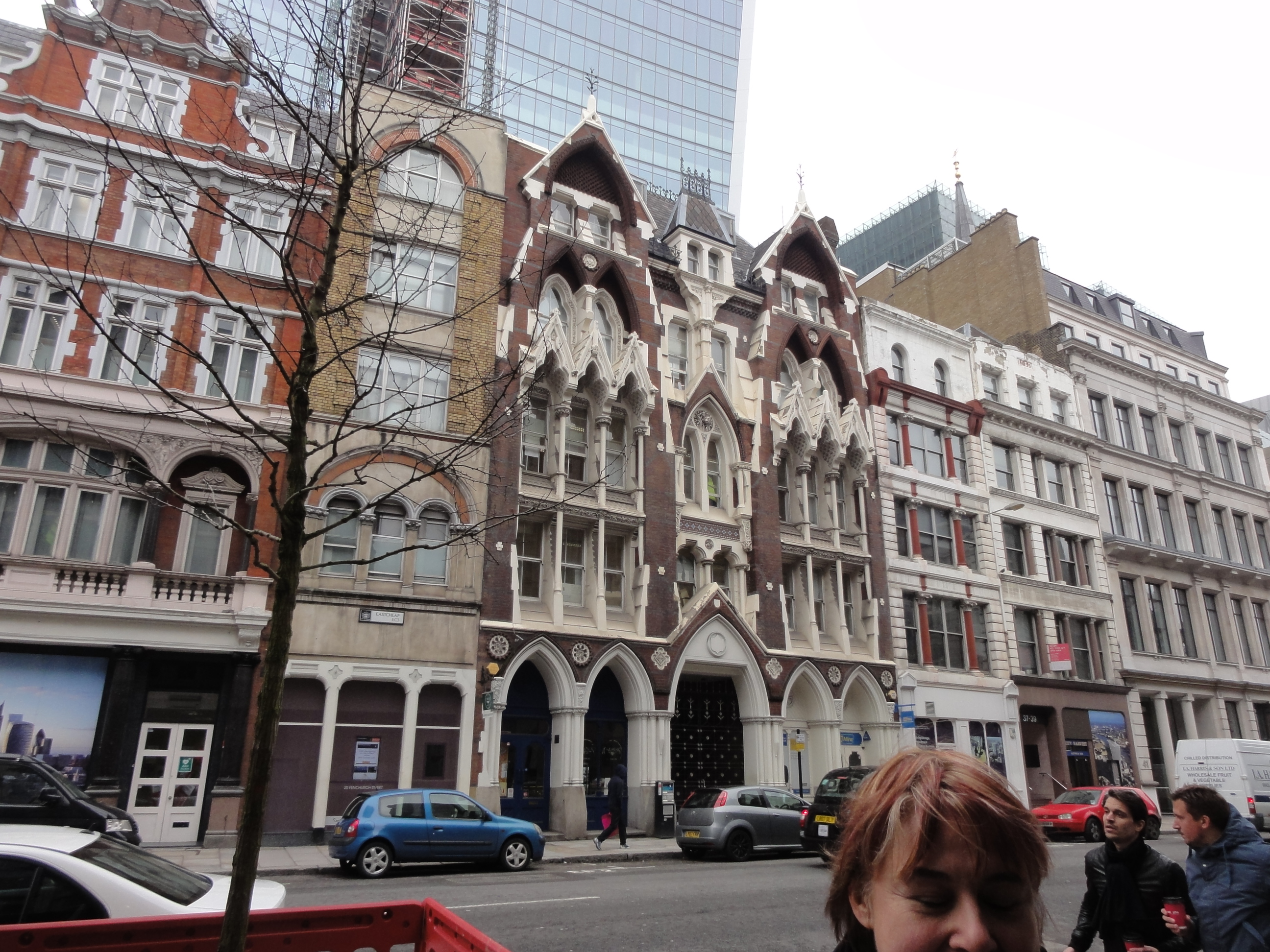
The Eastcheap building was intended as a warehouse. The exterior is decorated with references to the original Boar's Head tavern. It is currently an office building.

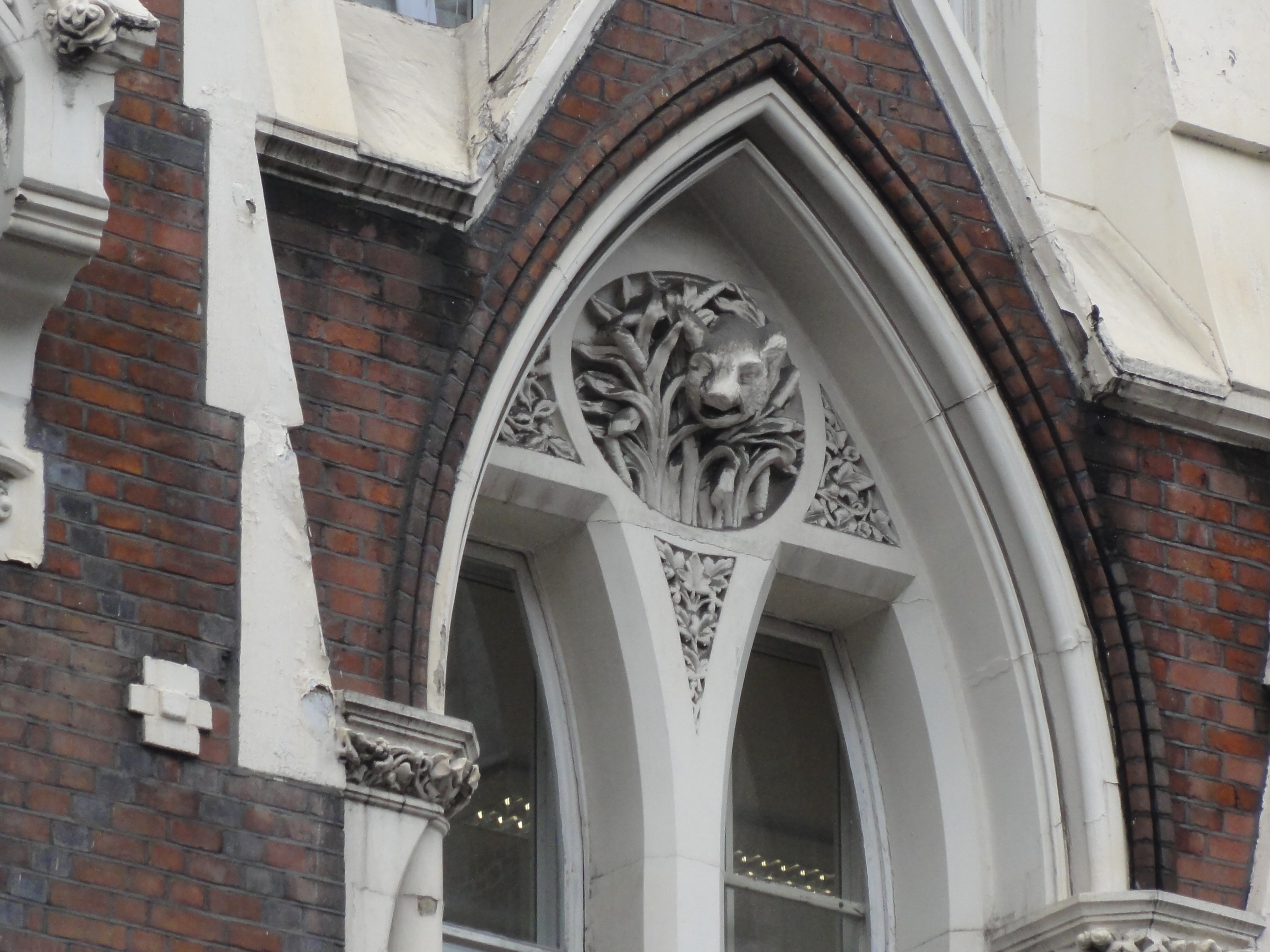
Close up, showing boar's head decoration

In 1868 Roumieu designed 33–35 Eastcheap in the City of London as a vinegar warehouse for Hill, Evans & Co at a cost of £8,170. It has been seen as "crazy and dazzling" and as one of the City of London's most original commercial façades. Ian Nairn characterised it as "truly demoniac, an Edgar Allan Poe of a building", arguing that it should be preserved "not as an oddity, but as a basic part of human temperament, and one which doesn't often get translated into architecture".

Stamp and Amery praise the originality with which "the high gables broke through the standard cornice line and the confident canopies gave tremendous vigour to the façade. Describing it as "the City's masterpiece of polychromatic Gothic self-advertisement", Pevsner notes its

Red brick with blue brick bands...dressed in Tisbury stone with Devonshire marble columns, all organized into a frenzy of sharp gables, a shaft resting on top of a gable, others starting on corbels. Strictly symmetrical...twin three-bay outer sections narrow as they rise, exposing a recessed centre with a dormer in the steep roof."

The roofline is accentuated with iron foliage finials. Above the two lights of the central Gothic window Roumieu placed an animal carving in a medallion, depicting a wild boar peeping out from long grass. This alludes to the celebrated Boar's Head tavern in Eastcheap which features in Shakespeare's Henry IV plays as the scene of drunken revelry between Young Prince Hal and Falstaff.

=== List of other works ===
Roumieu's other work included:

- Islington Literary and Scientific Institution (1837, with AD Gough). Now the Almeida Theatre.
- Schools and teachers' residence for St Peter's church, Islington, (1839–40, with AD Gough)
- Free church and schools, Paradise Street, St Pancras (1842, with AD Gough). Neo-Tudor style.
- Additions to Charles Barry's church of St Peter, Islington (1843, with AD Gough) 1843.
- Furnace chimney at Victoria Iron Works, Cubitt Town, Isle of Dogs, London (with AD Gough).
- Group of Italianate villas at Tollington Park, Islington (with AD Gough).
- St Michael's Church, Bingfield Street, Islington (1863–4).
- St. Mark's Church (1864–6) and Parsonage, Royal Tunbridge Wells.
- French Protestant Hospital (French Hospital), Victoria Park, Hackney (1866). Described in John Timbs' Curiosities of London as "in the pure French domestic style of the early sixteenth century".
- Hillside, Brookshill, Harrow Weald (1868). Commissioned by Thomas Francis Blackwell, of the Crosse and Blackwell company, for his daughter-in-law and her children. The main house was reduced to ruins by fire in the 1950s, although Roumieu's coach and stables survive.
- Restoration and additions to "Franks", Kent and of Kensworth Church, Hertfordshire.
- Manor Park Estate, Streatham, London.
- Prudential Assurance office, Ludgate Hill, City of London.
- Chambers in 10 Old Broad Street, City of London.
- Victoria Wharf, Upper Thames Street, City of London.
- Woodall's Carriage Factory, Orchard Street, London.
- Additions to Itchel Manor House, Itchel, Hampshire and to Whitbourne Hall, near Worcester.
- "The Lymes", Stanmore, Middlesex.
- "The Cedars," Harrow Weald, Middlesex.
- Additions to "The Priory" (Sir James Knight Bruce), Roehampton, and "The Priory," Wimbledon
- Several warehouses for the vinegar-makers Crosse & Blackwell, and stables for the same firm in Crown Street, Soho, London (Crown Street was later absorbed into the new Charing Cross Road).

Roumieu was also surveyor to the Gas, Light and Coke Company's Estate at Beckton, the French Hospital Estate, St Luke's, and several other estates in and near London.

== Family ==
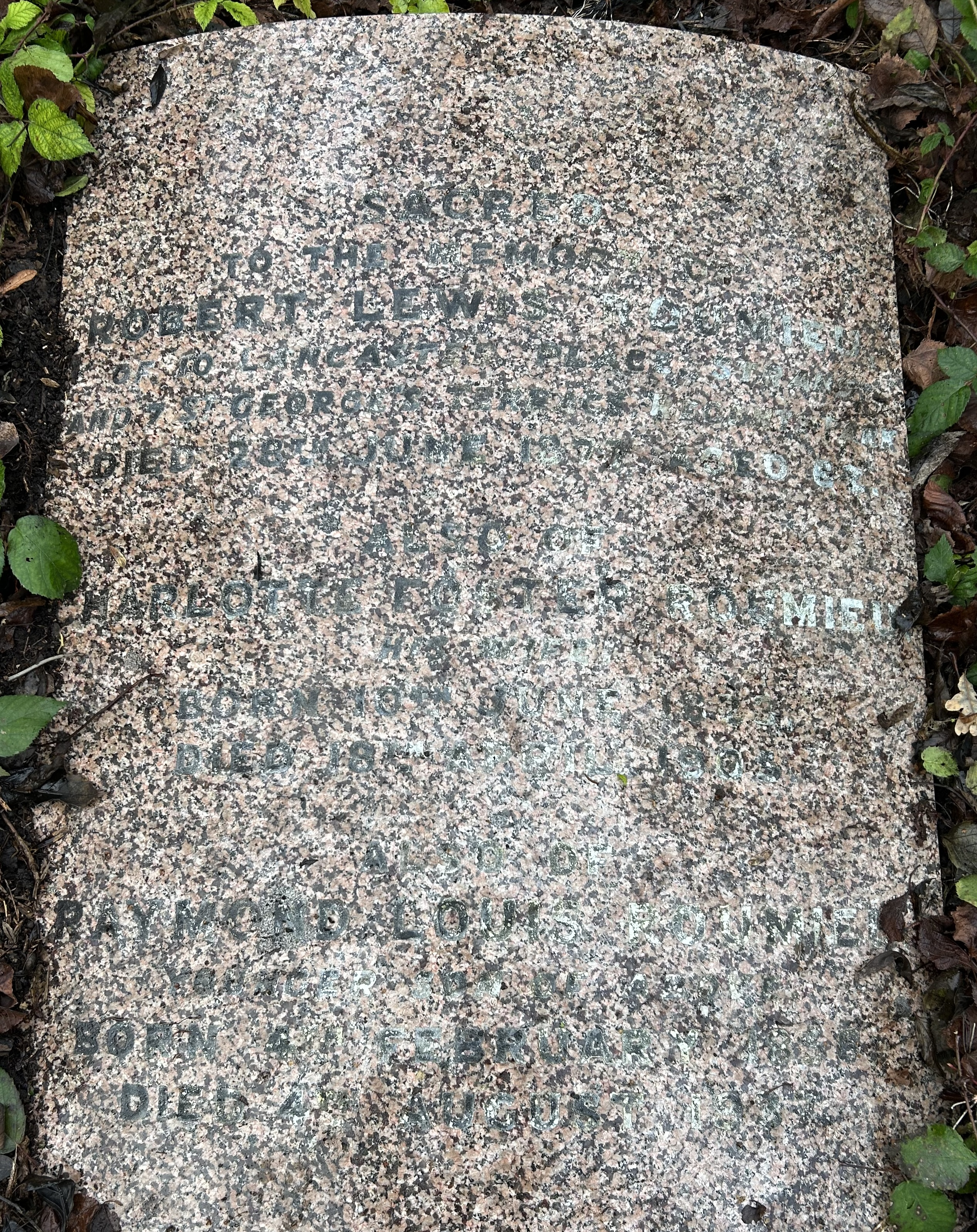
Grave of Robert Lewis Roumieu in Highgate Cemetery

=== Reginald St Aubyn Roumieu ===
Roumieu's son, Reginald St Aubyn Roumieu (1854–1921) had an architectural practice with Alfred Aitchison at his father's premises of 10 Lancaster Place, near the Strand. Roumieu and Aitchison completed R.L. Roumieu's Crosse & Blackwell warehouse designs for Charing Cross Road, following his demise in 1877, and then undertook further commissions for the firm in the same area. His daughter Emillie Isabel married and divorced Alexander C Wylie who went on to marry twice more, becoming the father of author I. A. R. Wylie with his 2nd (Australian) wife.

Reginald St Aubyn Roumieu reflected the family's origins in becoming President of the Huguenot Society in London. In this capacity, he unveiled a memorial in 1911 to Wandsworth Huguenots. He maintained his father's association with the French Hospital, as seen by an inscribed bowl presented to him by its directors on 13 January 1921. It was sold in 2007 by the auction firm Bonhams in Edinburgh for £2,500.

=== Derby connection ===
The Roumieu family appear to have owned land in Derby which was eventually bought from them for council housing. It is recorded that 76 acres (31 ha) of land on Osmaston Park Road "were bought in 1914 from R St Aubyn Roumieu, R L Roumieu (and others) for £8000 averaging £104 per acre".
