= Tunbridge Wells railway station =

Train station in Kent, England

Coordinates: 51.130°N 0.263°E

Tunbridge Wells
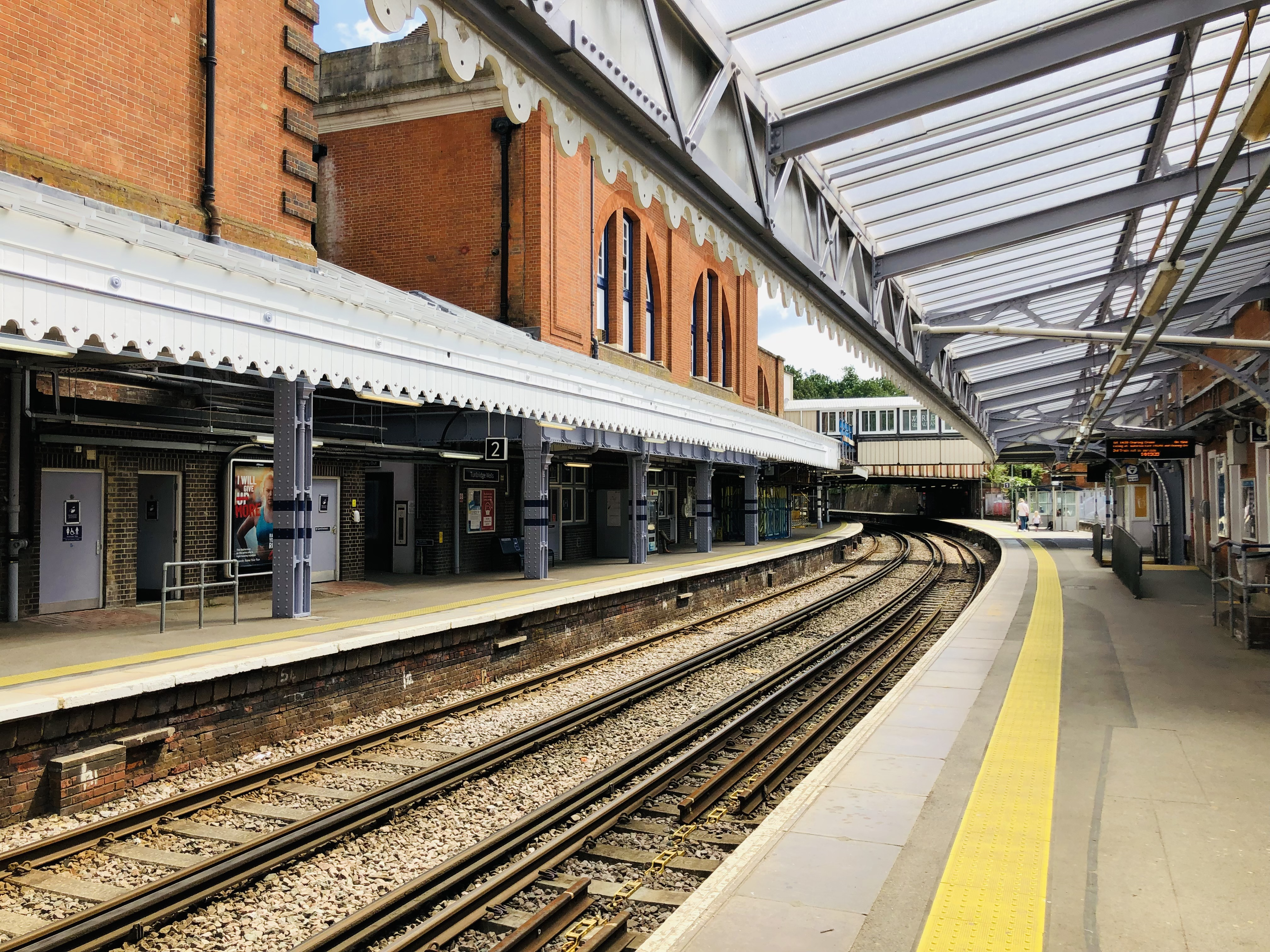
- The platforms at Tunbridge Wells, looking south

General information
- Location: Royal Tunbridge Wells, Tunbridge Wells; England
- Grid reference: TQ584392
- Manager: Southeastern
- Platforms: 2

Other information
- Station code: TBW
- Classification: DfT category C1

Key dates
- 20 September 1845: first station opened
- 25 November 1846: present station opened

Passengers
- 2020/21: ▼0.736 million
- Interchange: ▼7,440
- 2021/22: ▲2.097 million
- Interchange: ▲21,915
- 2022/23: ▲2.566 million
- Interchange: ▲72,163
- 2023/24: ▲2.839 million
- Interchange: ▼70,744
- 2024/25: ▲3.039 million
- Interchange: ▼65,618
Location
Notes
- Passenger statistics from the Office of Rail and Road

Tunbridge Wells train station is on the Hastings line in the south of England and serves Royal Tunbridge Wells in Kent. It is 34 miles 32 chains (55.4 km) down the line from London Charing Cross. The station and all trains serving it are operated by Southeastern.

== History ==
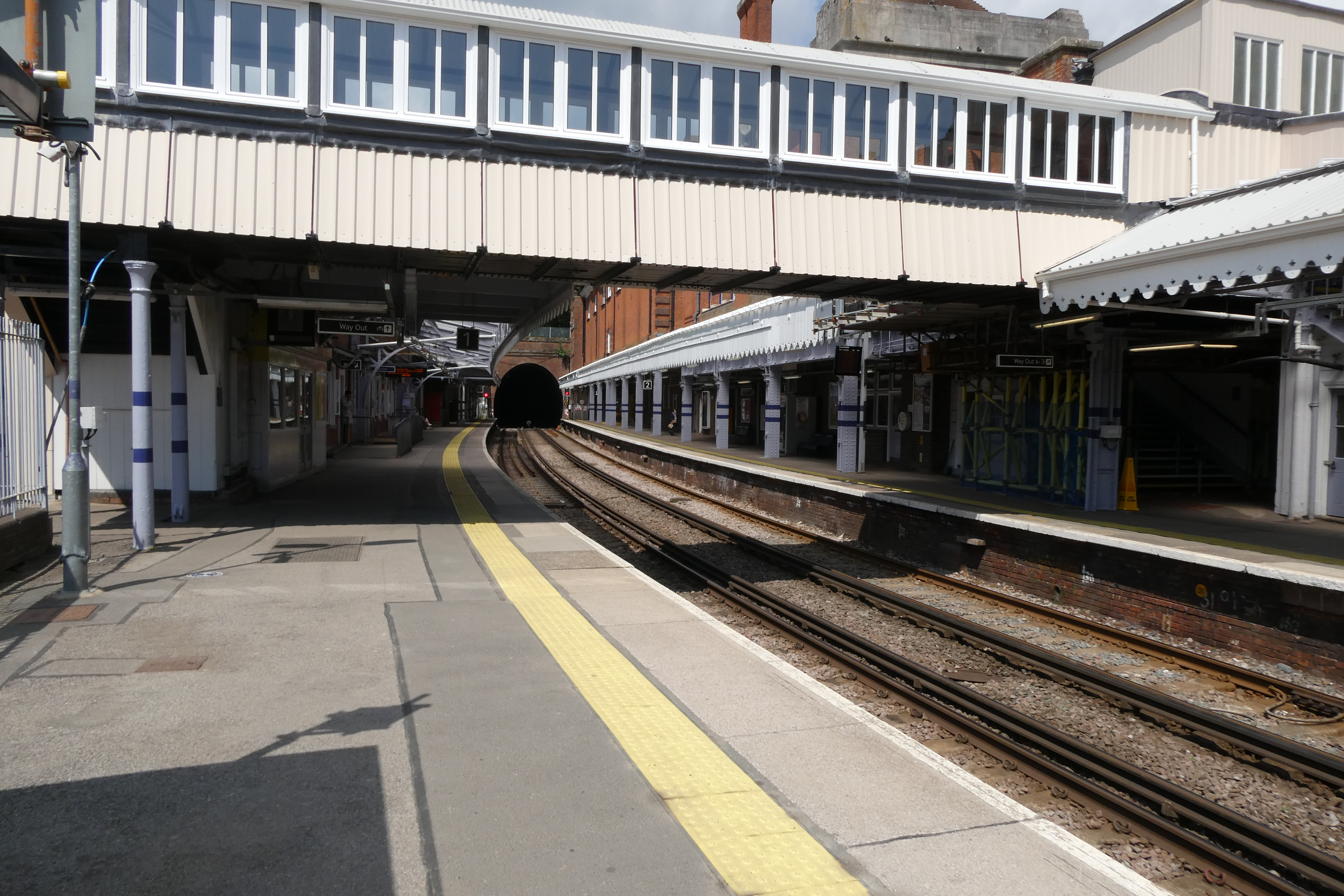
The platforms, looking north

The first station was a temporary terminus opened on 20 September 1845 situated north of Wells Tunnel. This closed when the line was extended to the present station, which opened on 25 November 1846. It became a through station in 1851 when the line opened to Robertsbridge, and a year later opened through to Hastings. The London, Brighton and South Coast Railway's line from Grove Junction to Tunbridge Wells (West) opened in 1867 for goods and 1876 for passengers. Immediately after becoming part of the Southern Railway in 1923, the station was named Tunbridge Wells Central.

The single line branch to Tunbridge Wells West formerly diverged at Grove Junction, to the south of the station and Grove Hill tunnel. The branch closed on 6 July 1985, but the disused Grove Tunnel that carried the single track to West station remains intact. The double line becomes single before passing through the Strawberry Hill tunnel slightly further south, but the down line up to the north end of said tunnel remains in use as a turnback siding for trains terminating at the station.

In 1985, in preparation for electrification, the platforms were rebuilt and the tracks were resignalled. Electric trains started running in 1986. The station again became just Tunbridge Wells.

Since 1974, the up side of the station only has been Grade II listed.

== Services ==
All services at Tunbridge Wells are operated by Southeastern using Class 375, 465 and 466 EMUs.

The typical off-peak service in trains per hour is:

- 2 tph to London Charing Cross
- 2 tph to Hastings (1 semi-fast, 1 stopping)

Additional services, including trains to and from London Cannon Street and Ore call at the station in the peak hours. Some peak-hour and early morning/evening trains to/from Tonbridge and London also originate/terminate here.

| Preceding station | National Rail | Following station |
|---|---|---|
| High Brooms | Southeastern Hastings Line | Frant |
| | Disused railways | |
| High Brooms Line and station open | British Rail Southern Region Cuckoo Line | Tunbridge Wells West Line closed, station open (Spa Valley Railway) |
| Terminus | British Rail Southern Region Three Bridges to Tunbridge Wells Central Line | Tunbridge Wells West Line closed, station open (Spa Valley Railway) |
