= High Brooms =

Suburb of Royal Tunbridge Wells, England

Coordinates: 51.149320°N 0.276980°E

- Location within Kent
- District: Tunbridge Wells
- Shire county: Kent
- Region: South East
- Country: England
- Sovereign state: United Kingdom
- Post town: Tunbridge Wells
- Postcode district: TN4
- Police: Kent
- Fire: Kent
- Ambulance: South East Coast
- UK Parliament: Tunbridge Wells

High Brooms is a suburb of Royal Tunbridge Wells in Kent, England. Its railway station is High Brooms railway station. It is connected by train to London and Hastings. The suburb is located in the civil parish of Southborough.

Between 1885 and 1968, the High Brooms Brick & Tile Company excavated clay in the area.

== See also ==
- Tunbridge Wells
