= Alexander Dick Gough =

English architect

Alexander Dick Gough (3 November 1804 – 8 September 1871) was an English architect who practised in London, where much of his work may be found. He was a pupil of Benjamin Dean Wyatt, and worked in partnership with Robert Lewis Roumieu between 1837 and 1848.

== Life ==
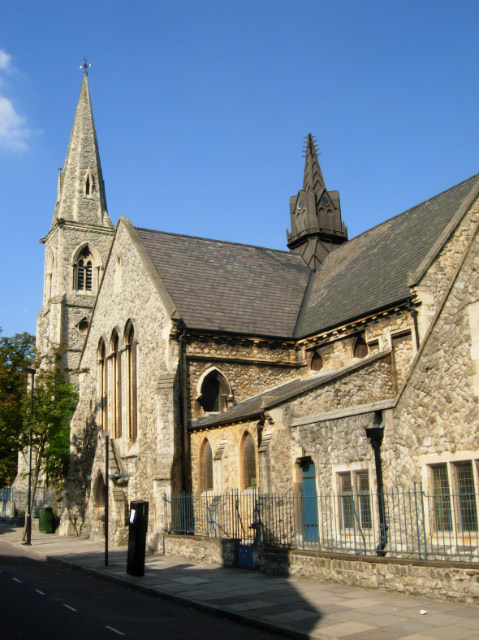
Gough's church of St Mark, Tollington Park, 1854

Gough was born on 3 November 1804 at Somers Town in London, the son of Alexander and Mary Gough.

In 1823, at the age of 19, after some foreign travel, he became a pupil of the architect Benjamin Dean Wyatt, who entrusted him with the superintendence of several of his most important works, including Apsley House and the Duke of York's Column.

In 1836 he set up in practice in partnership with another of Wyatt's pupils, Robert Lewis Roumieu. Between 1837 and 1847, the two men exhibited 14 architectural drawings at the Royal Academy, mostly of buildings they were in the course of erecting. Their works included the Islington Literary and Scientific Institution (1837–8 ), in a stripped Classical style, new schools and teachers' residence for St. Peter's, Islington (1839–40) and the Tudor Revival free church and schools in Paradise Street, St Pancras. They made additions to Charles Barry's Early English church of St. Peter, Islington, built Milner Square, Islington (1840–3) and rebuilt St Pancras Old Church in a Norman style (1847–48). The last of these projects was described in a contemporary report as being by "Mr Gough, of the firm of Gough and Roumieu". Nikolaus Pevsner attributed de Beauvoir Square, Hackney, to the partnership, although there is no documentary evidence for their involvement.

During 1845 Gough made surveys, partly on his own account and partly with Roumieu, for the Exeter, Dorchester, and Weymouth Junction Coast railway; for the Direct West-End and Croydon railway; and for the Dover, Deal, Sandwich, and Ramsgate Direct Coast railway. From 1846 to 1848 he made numerous surveys for compensation claims against other railway companies.

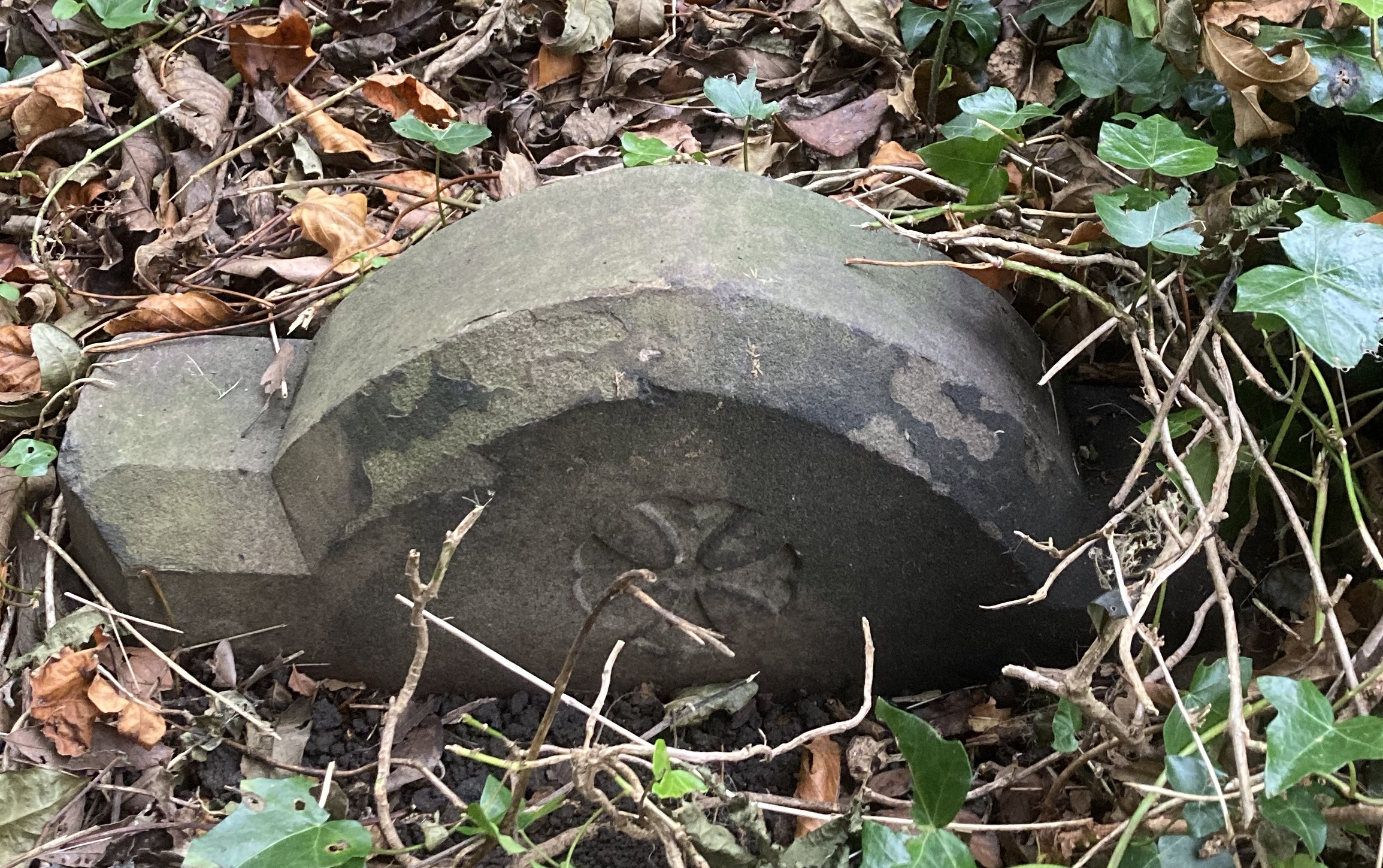
Grave of Alexander Dick Gough in Highgate Cemetery (west side)

The partnership between Gough and Roumieu was dissolved in 1848. During the remainder of his career as an architect, Gough built a number of new churches, six of them in Islington. and extended or restored others. A contemporary review of his church of St Paul at Chatham, built in a Norman Revival style in 1853-5, noted that Gough had followed medieval models much more closely in the details than in the general form, and praised the building's areas of boldly-executed surface-carving. He also designed schools and executed private commissions.

Gough died on 8 September 1871, aged 67, and was buried in a modest grave (no.15710) on the western side of Highgate Cemetery. Only the top of the headstone is visible.

His son, Hugh Roumieu Gough, succeeded to his practice.

== Works ==
=== In partnership with R. L. Roumieu ===
- Islington Literary and Scientific Institution (Neoclassical), 1837. Now the Almeida Theatre.
- Schools and teachers' residence for St Peter's church, Islington, 1839–40.
- Free church and schools, Paradise Street, St Pancras, 1842 (Tudor).
- Additions to Charles Barry's church of St Peter, Islington, 1843.
- Milner Square, Islington, 1841–43.
- Furnace chimney at Victoria Iron Works, Cubitt Town, Isle of Dogs.
- Group of Italianate villas at Tollington Park, Islington.
- Rebuilding of St Pancras Old Church, 1847–48 (Norman).

=== Later works ===
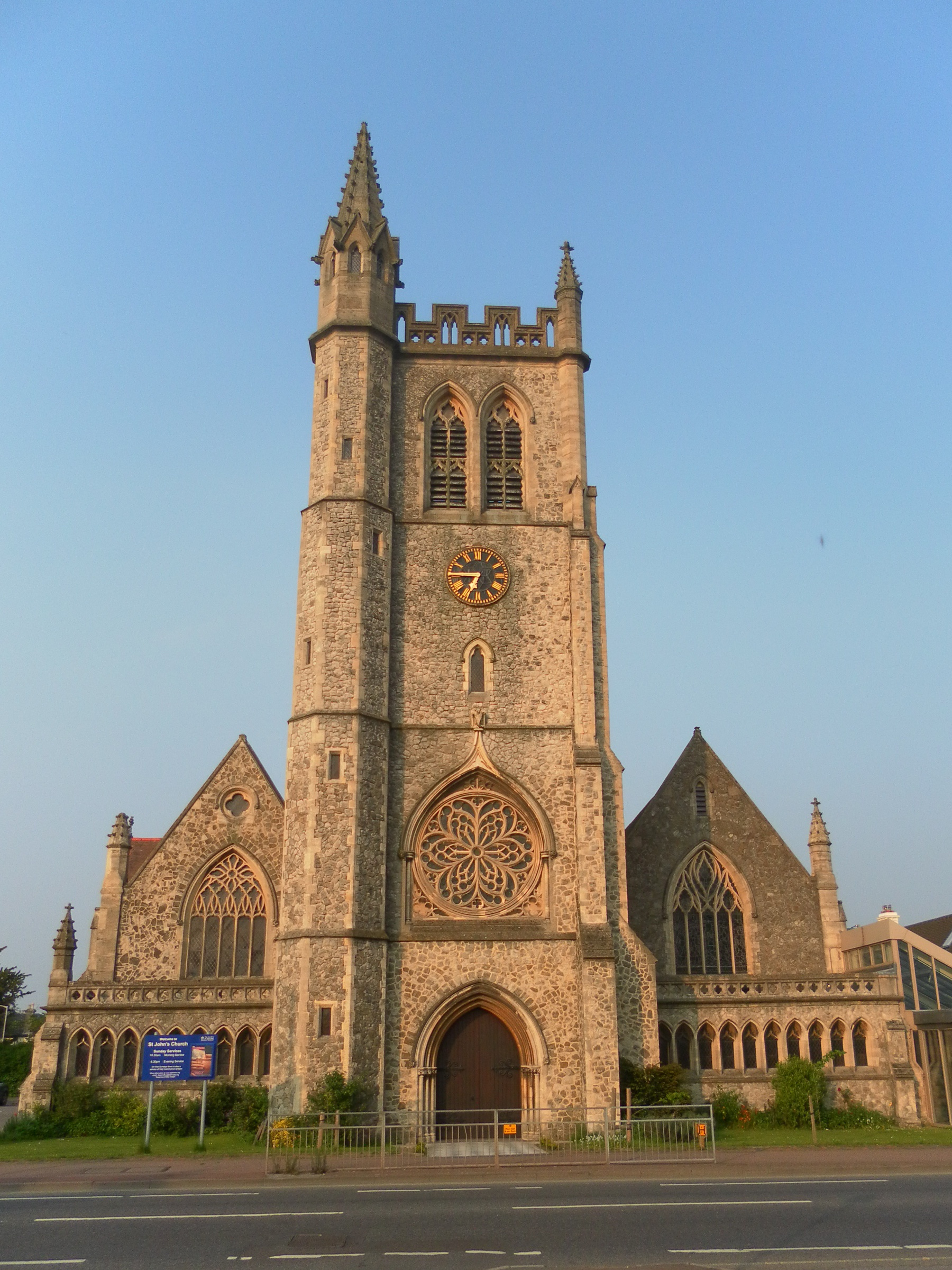
St John's Church, Tunbridge Wells

- St Matthew, Denmark Hill, consecrated 1848, tower and spire complete by 1858; destroyed 1940.
- Rebuilding of St. Matthew's Church, Essex Road, Islington (Perpendicular); demolished.
- St. Paul's Church, Chatham, Kent, 1853-5 (Norman); demolished.
- St. Mark's, Tollington Park, Islington, 1853-4 (Early English).
- St. Jude's, Mildmay Park, Islington, 1854–1855. (Gothic).
- St. Philip the Evangelist, Arlington Square, 1855–7 (Norman); demolished.
- St. John's, Tunbridge Wells, 1857–8. (Decorated).
- St. John's, Marchington Woodlands, Staffordshire (Decorated) 1858–1859; tower and spire added in 1860.
- Christ Church, Ore, Sussex, 1858–9 (Decorated).
- St. Mary's, Hornsey Rise, 1860–1 (Decorated).
- Girls' Industrial Schools, Cardington, Bedfordshire, 1861.
- Soldiers' Institute, Chatham, Kent, 1861 (Italianate); demolished except for the ground-floor facade.
- St. Silas, Dawlish Street, Lambeth, 1864–5 (Lombardic). Built as a mission church to St Barnabas, Kennington; damaged during the Second World War and later demolished.
- St. John the Evangelist, Prospect Street, Hull, 1865–6 (Decorated); built for the Free Church of England, but acquired by the Presbyterians in 1868.
- St. Saviour's, Herne Hill Road, Camberwell, 1866–7 (Gothic); chancel and south transept added in 1870 to designs by W. Gibbs Bartleet; demolished 1981.
- St. Anne's, Poole's Park, Islington, 1870 (Romanesque), the tower and spire being added by H. Roumieu Gough in 1877. Demolished 1965.
- Schools for St. Lawrence's Church, Effingham, Surrey.

Gough also reconstructed the interiors of St. Mary's, Brampton, Huntingdonshire; St. Nicholas's, Rochester (where he also built a parsonage) St. Giles's, Pitchcott, Buckinghamshire and St. Margaret's, Rainham, Kent. He built new chancels at St. Thomas's, Winchelsea, Sussex; and All Saints', Hastings.
