= Bethany School, Goudhurst =

Coordinates: 51°8′9″N 0°29′2″E

Bethany School

Location
- Goudhurst; Cranbrook, Kent, TN17 1LB; England

Information
- Type: Private
- Established: 1866
- Founder: Reverend Joseph James Kendon
- Department for Education URN: 118978 Tables
- Headmaster: Paul Jones, FCCT, MEd Educational Leadership
- Staff: 35 Teaching 34 Support
- Gender: Mixed
- Age: 11 to 18
- Enrolment: 313
- Colours: Navy and white
- Deputy Head Academic: Bryony Potter
- Deputy Head Pastoral: Alan Sturrock
- Inspector: ISI
- Campus: Rural
- Website: www.bethanyschool.org.uk

Bethany School is a private boarding and day school for girls and boys aged 11–18 (Year 7–11 and Sixth Form), in Goudhurst, Kent, United Kingdom.

== History and facilities ==
The school was founded by a Baptist minister, The Reverend Joseph James Kendon, in 186 and is set in 60 acres (24 ha) of countryside.

Bethany School has a wide variety of sports. Rugby, football and cricket are among the most popular sports for boys, with netball, hockey and rounders for girls. The school also has other sports facilities, including fitness premises, and a 25-metre (82 ft), six-lane indoor swimming pool.

Headmaster Francie Healy retired in August 2026 after serving 16 years as in the post and 37 years at the school in all. The headmaster is Paul Jones.

== Developments since 1999 ==
- 1999 - The orchard was completed, providing a separate living area for Sixth Form boarding pupils.
- 2001 - The modern sports complex was completed, providing a new 'weights room' and a climbing wall.
- 2002 - The new library was completed, with the former library being converted into a drama studio.
- 2003 - The Holmes Building was completed, which houses Business Studies and Geography.
- 2005 - The reconstructed dining hall complex was completed.
- 2006 - The modern Food & Nutrition rooms and new language classrooms were opened.
- 2007 - The new Astroturf was completed.
- 2009 - The new Science block was completed, costing £5 million.
- 2013 - The refurbishment within the boarding accommodation was completed.
- 2023 - Construction of the £4.5 million Performing Arts Centre began, and the Pengelly House was demolished, replaced by the bus car park.
- 2024 - The Pengelly Performance Centre and new Music School were completed.

== The Bethanians' Society ==
The Bethanians' Society was founded in 1887 for the former pupils of the School.

== See also ==
- Category:People educated at Bethany School, Goudhurst
