= Park Farm railway station =

Proposed railway station in Kent, England

Coordinates: 51.1132°N 0.8807°E

Park Farm railway station, also known as Kingsnorth railway station, was a proposal for a railway station in Kent on the Marshlink line between Ashford International and Ham Street stations. The station would serve the Park Farm and Cheeseman's Green development areas. In December 2018 it was announced that the station would not be built.

== Location ==
The station's site has been reserved, and sits between the A2070, a main road shadowing the Marshlink line, and Bridgefield Park. An access road was built off Finn Farm Rd south of Bridgefield Park.

== Background ==
The station has been proposed by Ashford Borough Council. It would be funded by estate developers, who could use the station site for local shops and retail units. The council did not plan to build the station until the Marshlink line was electrified between Ashford International and Ore, which was investigated as part of a multi modal study with the Highways Agency.

The scheme was first announced in 2001. At a Joint Transportation Board meeting on 8 March 2016, the council announced there would be insufficient capital for the station to be built, and funding would need to be obtained from elsewhere. The following year, engineering firm Peter Brett announced the station would probably cost between £6 and £10 million to build. The council still hoped that the project could go ahead.

In December 2018, it was announced that the station would not be built, as it would attract too many visitors using it as a "park and ride" facility to Ashford and disrupt existing services on the Marshlink line, which have already been criticised for being slow.

== Facilities ==
Two platforms were proposed, each catering for a 4-car train until with up to 300 seats. There would have been a dedicated route for pedestrians to cross between platforms, probably via an accommodation bridge constructed as part of the Park Farm South development. Around 50 to 70 parking spaces would have been provided, with additional drop-off points.
