= Rye railway station (Rye and Camber Tramway) =

Former railway station in England

Coordinates: 50.9530°N 0.7401°E

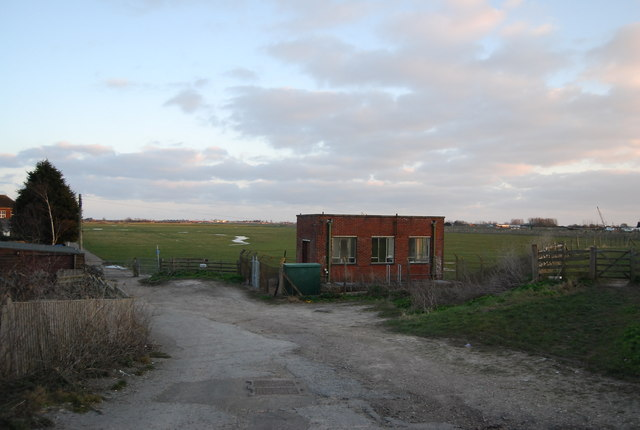
Former location of the station

Rye railway station was a terminal station on the Rye and Camber Tramway in East Sussex, connecting Rye to Camber.

Although the station was close to the Ashford – Hastings line (now the Marshlink Line), it did not connect to it or have direct access to the main Rye railway station. It was sited immediately east of the River Rother outside the town, next to the Guldeford Road (now the A259).

The station first opened on 13 July 1895 with a 1 3/4-mile (2.8 km) section of the tramway providing access to the local golf links. A further 1/2-mile (0.80 km) extension to Camber Sands opened on 13 July 1908. Increasing competition of bus services led to the line's decline and the station closed in 1939.
