= Marshlink line =

Railway line in South East England

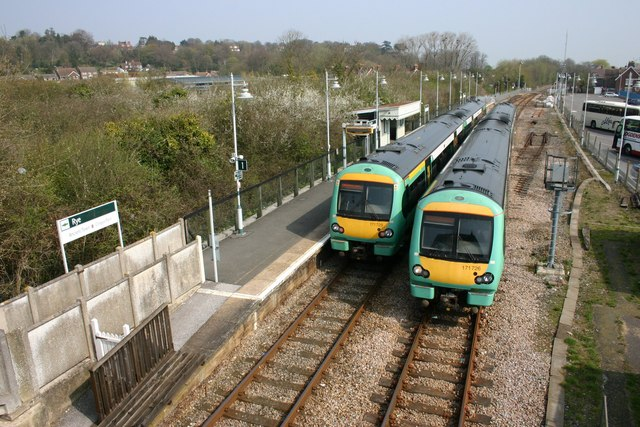
- Two trains stand in the station and passing loop at Rye, at the mid-point of the single-track section of the line

Overview
- Status: Operational
- Owner: Network Rail
- Locale: Kent, East Sussex
- Termini: Ashford International, Hastings
- Stations: 9

Service
- Type: Heavy rail
- System: National Rail
- Services: Ashford International–Hastings; Branch line to Dungeness (freight only)
- Operator(s): Southern
- Depot(s): Ashford International, Selhurst
- Rolling stock: Class 171 Turbostar (2003–)

History
- Opened: 13 February 1851

Technical
- Line length: 26 miles 21 chains (42.27 km)
- Number of tracks: Single and double tracked: 2 (Ashford International–Appledore); 1 (Appledore–Rye); 2 (Passing loop at Rye); 1 (Rye–Ore); 2 (Ore–Hastings); 1 (Branch line to Dungeness)
- Character: Rural
- Track gauge: 1,435 mm (4 ft 8 1/2 in) standard gauge
- Electrification: None (Ashford International to Ore); 750 V DC third rail (Ore to Hastings)
- Operating speed: 60 mph (97 km/h) maximum
Route map
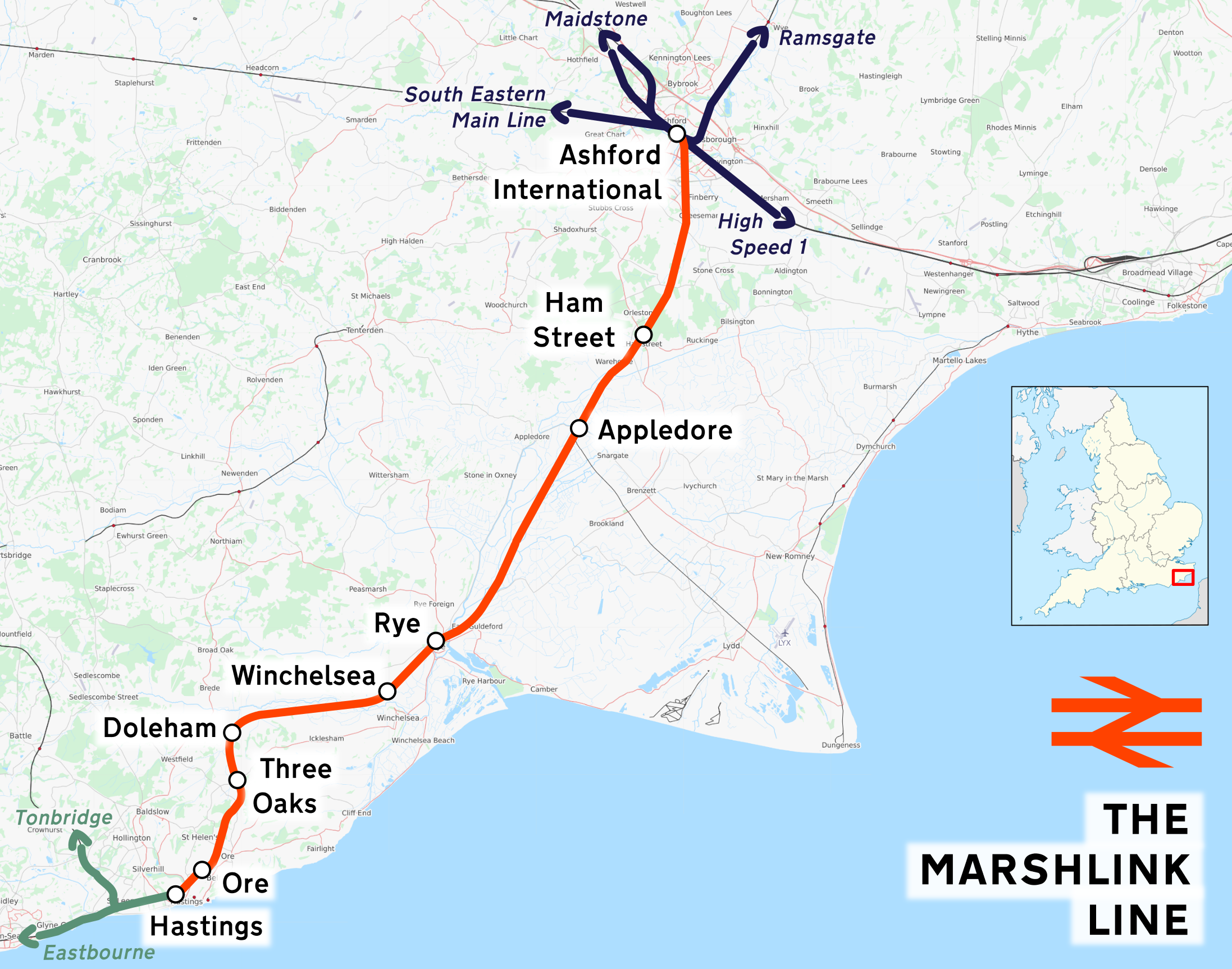
(Click to expand)

The Marshlink line is a railway line in South East England. It runs from Ashford, in Kent, via Romney Marsh, Rye and the Ore Tunnel to Hastings, where it connects to the East Coastway line towards Eastbourne and Brighton. The line is one of the few in South East England that has not been electrified, despite regular proposals to do so; Southern uses Class 171 diesel multiple units (DMU)s on the route.

The line was constructed by the South Eastern Railway (SER) in the late 1840s as a priority for military traffic. The SER clashed with the rival London, Brighton and South Coast Railway, leading to disputes over the route, planning and operation. After delays, the line opened in February 1851, followed by branch lines to Rye Harbour in 1854, Dungeness in 1881 and New Romney in 1884. The line struggled to be profitable and it seemed likely that it would close, as recommended by the Beeching Report. All branch lines were closed to passengers by 1967, but the main line was kept open because of poor road connections in the area; the branch to Dungeness remained open for freight. Although the line has been partially single-tracked and was slow to be modernised, it has survived into the 21st century.

== Name ==
The name Marshlink was first used in the 1970s by the Southern region of British Rail in an attempt to improve marketing; some trains had the name painted on the side. The line from Tunbridge Wells to Hastings was branded the 1066 line at the same time.

== History ==
=== Construction ===
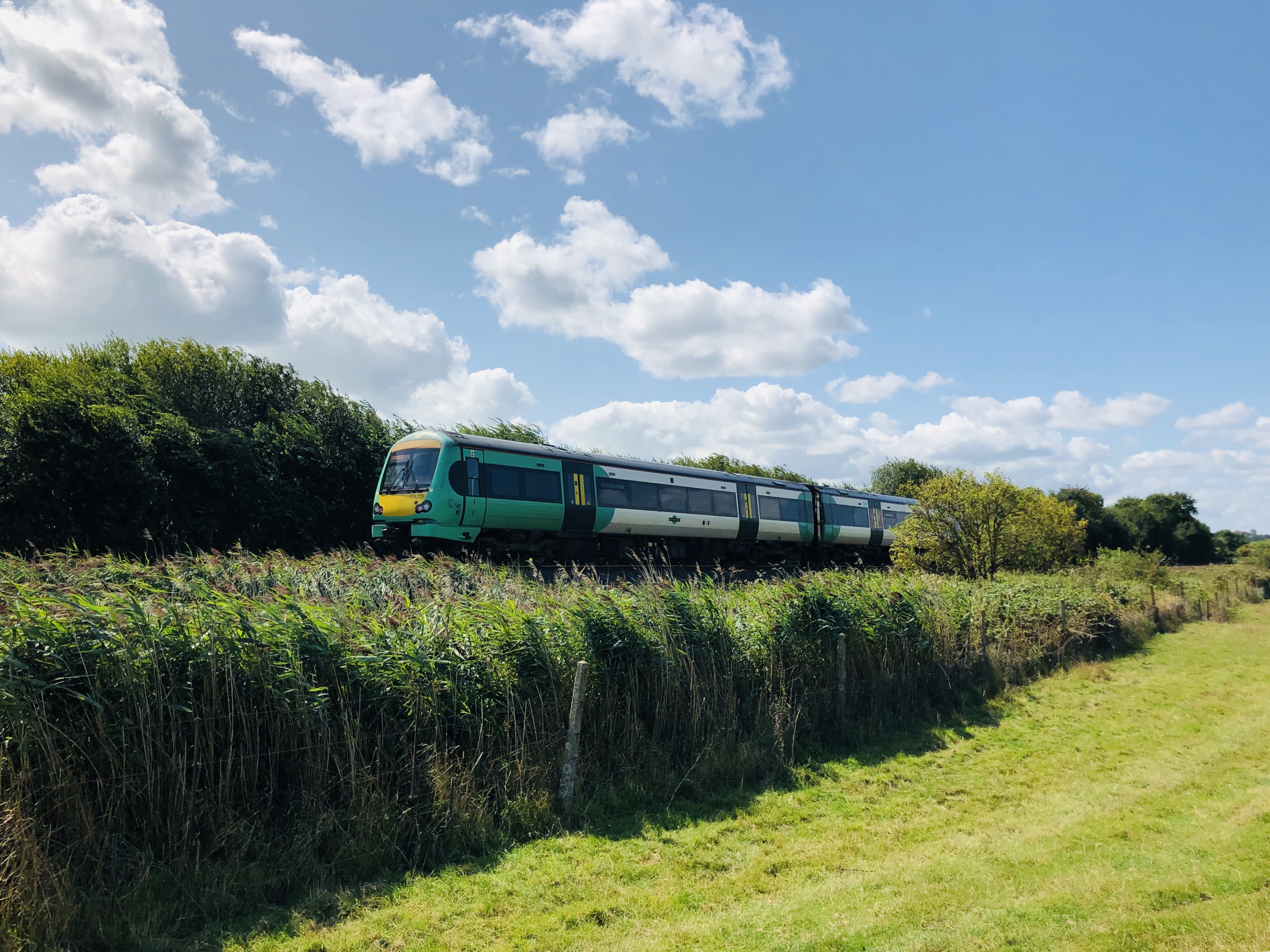
The Marshlink line passing through countryside near Winchelsea

The line was proposed by the Brighton, Lewes and Hastings Railway (BLHR), founded in June 1844 to construct a link between those three towns in association with the London and Brighton Railway (LBR). The South Eastern Railway (SER) wanted to construct a line between Headcorn, Rye and Hastings, but the parliamentary select committee thought there would be insufficient traffic. After the Brighton, Lewes and Hastings Railway Act 1844 (7 & 8 Vict. c. xci) was passed to construct the Brighton–Hastings line (now the East Coastway line), the LBR thought it would be useful to extend it towards Rye and Ashford, an area otherwise dominated by SER plans. The SER conducted their own survey from Ashford to Rye, in the hope that they would be allowed to construct and own the line instead.

During the 1844–45 parliamentary session, the Board of Trade decided to approve the BLHR's plans. The SER were unhappy about this arrangement and during the summer of 1845 abandoned their Headcorn–Rye–Hastings scheme, focusing on Hastings–Rye–Ashford instead. The two companies reached a compromise, by which the BLHR were authorised to build the line from Hastings to Ashford, with a caveat that the SER could take over operation if they wished. The proposed line passed through countryside with only Rye as a significant settlement, so the SER easily persuaded the BLHR to hand over construction rights.

Parliament deemed that the line was of strategic military importance and ordered that it was to be completed before the extension of the Hastings line from Tunbridge Wells to Hastings. As part of the contract, the SER had to pay £10,000 towards refurbishing Rye Harbour and took responsibility for drainage of the Royal Military Canal, which ran close to the line along Romney Marsh.

On 27 July 1846, the LBR and BLHR amalgamated with several other lines to form the London, Brighton and South Coast Railway (LB&SCR). They became rivals with the SER and complained about a lack of progress. The SER were unhappy about the proposed line from Rye to Hastings via Ore, which they viewed as too expensive compared to the alternative route via Whatlington. The LB&SCR objected to this route as it was longer and consequently the SER dropped their proposals that November.

In July 1847, George Robert Stephenson designed a bridge across the Royal Military Canal near Warehorne, while Peter W. Barlow designed a swing bridge over the Rother at Rye. However, the specific route continued to be debated by the SER throughout early 1848. Work from the Ashford–Rye section started in earnest that summer, but subsequent heavy rain slowed construction. Workers propped the line up with hand spikes to prevent rails sinking and test trains heeled over in the wind. The line was planned as single-track, though this was changed to double-track in June 1850.

The line was planned to be opened on 28 October 1850 by Thomas Farncombe, Lord Mayor of London, who inserted the last brick in both the Ore and Mount Pleasant tunnels. Work on the line was not complete owing to a lack of locally available ballast, so the full ceremony was postponed. The opening date was moved to 1 January 1851, but this was cancelled following signalling problems. The line eventually opened on 13 February 1851, though this was hampered by the rivalries between the companies. The SER blocked LB&SCR trains entering Hastings, not recognising them as the legal successors to the BLHR.

After a court case, the two companies agreed to share the station's facilities for both lines. (Note: Due to this rivalry, Hastings station only opened with one through platform; the station was rebuilt in 1931 to allow more services.) Even after opening, there were complaints in early 1852 that the line was not completely finished and it was still marked "nearly complete" in March 1853. The dispute between the SER and the LB&SCR was not fully resolved until 5 December 1870, when the former was allowed to run trains to St Leonards Warrior Square.

The railway opened with four intermediate stations between Ashford and Hastings at Ham Street, Appledore, Rye and Winchelsea. There were almost no other places of significance along the line. Some stations were not near the settlement they served; for example, Appledore station is around 1.5 miles (2.4 km) from the village itself. Four trains per day ran each way on the line, reducing to two on Sundays. Few changes were made to the railway during the 19th century, aside from minor signalling work and some additional buildings. It was not declared profitable by the SER until 1895.

To make money and boost traffic on the line, the SER agreed to hold unlicensed boxing matches on Romney Marsh. On 29 January 1856, a special train ran from London Bridge to Appledore for a prize fight between Tom Sayers and Harry Poulson. Sayers won the fight, which was reportedly rigged by the SER for £1,000. The company was accused of "aiding and abetting a breach of the peace."

=== Branches from Rye ===
In 1846, a short branch was proposed from Rye station towards Rye Harbour. It was 3/8 mile (0.6 km) long and only used for freight, ending by the river Rother at a pier. The line opened in March 1854. It was almost derelict by 1955 and closed on 29 January 1960.

The Rye and Camber Tramway was a separate 3 feet (0.91 m) gauge line the other side of the river; it was proposed in 1895 with an initial budget of £2,800. A 1 3/4-mile (2.8 km) section from Rye to Golf Links Halt opened on 13 July 1895, followed by a 1/2 mile (0.8 km) extension to Camber Sands, opening on 13 July 1908. The line was closed in 1939, following competition from bus services, and was temporarily part-converted to road during the war. It was returned to railway after hostilities ended, but the line was impractical to repair to full use and hence closed permanently.

In 1901, the East Sussex Light Railway proposed a connection from Northiam on the Kent and East Sussex Railway to Rye. The SECR objected and it was abandoned.

=== Branch to Dungeness and New Romney ===
Rye and Denge-ness Railway and Pier Act 1873
- Act of Parliament
- Parliament of the United Kingdom
- Long title: An Act to authorise the construction of a Railway from near the Rye station of the South-eastern Railway in Sussex to Denge-ness in Kent, together with a Pier at the termination thereof.
- Citation: 36 & 37 Vict. c. ccxxxiv

Dates
- Royal assent: 5 August 1873

Text of statute as originally enacted

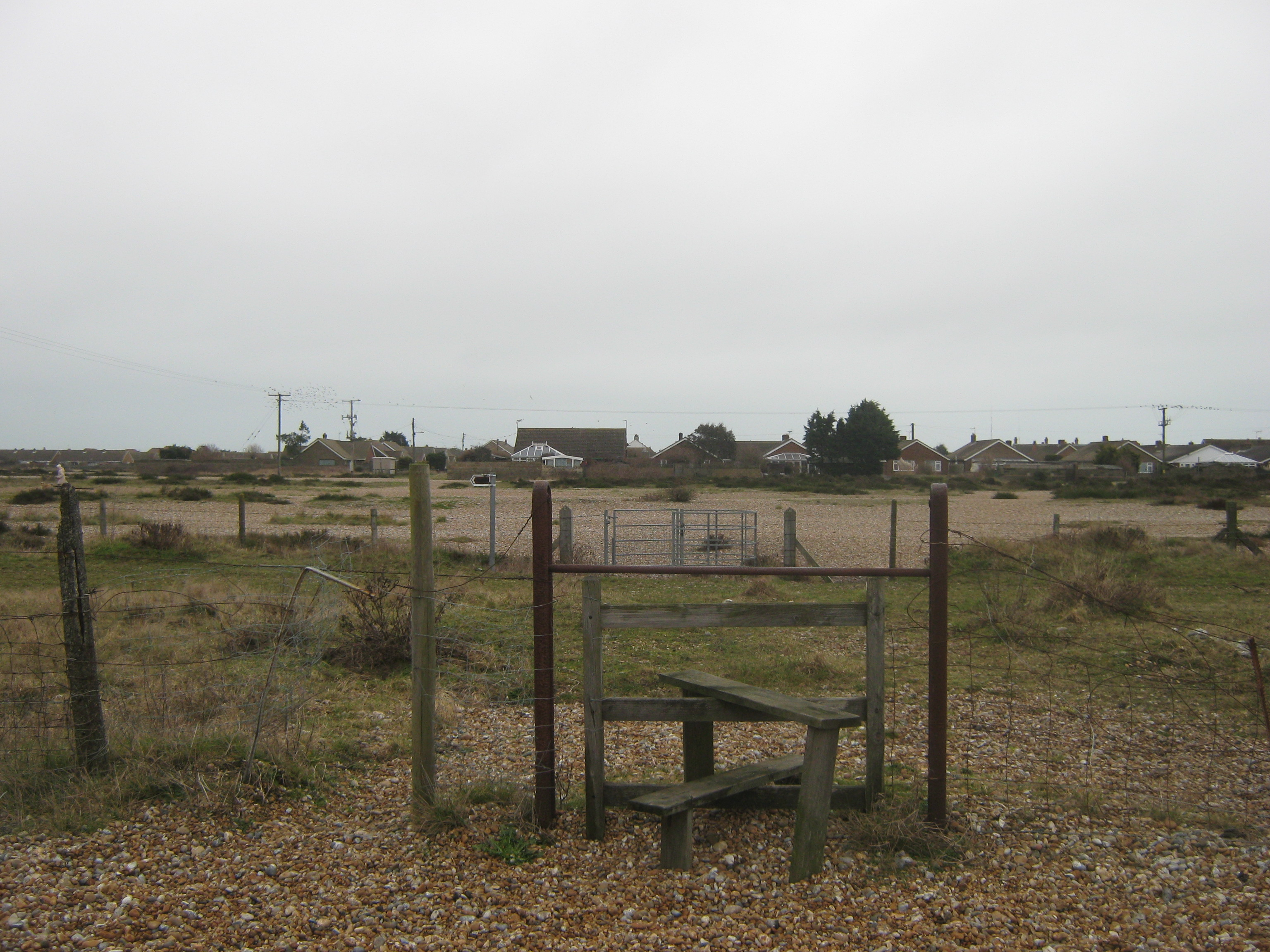
An obsolete stile over the former 1937 realignment of the line from Lydd to New Romney, closed since 1967

The SER had tenuous plans to build a cross-channel passenger ferry terminal at Dungeness, which would provide a dedicated route from London to Paris. In 1859, the Town Clerk of New Romney suggested a line should be built from Folkestone to Rye, via Dymchurch and Lydd, but the SER was not interested. However, in 1866 they became favourable about a branch line from Appledore, as it could support their international train proposals. The South Eastern Railway Act 1866 (29 & 30 Vict. c. ccxxvii) giving authority to build the line was obtained on 30 July that year, which included a branch to Denge Beach. On 5 August 1873, the SER were authorised by the Rye and Denge-ness Railway and Pier Act 1873 (36 & 37 Vict. c. ccxxxiv) to extend the line to Dungeness with a 100-yard (91 m) pier and landing stage. Progress stalled on the line in the 1870s and the SER were in danger of a rival railway taking over construction.

Lydd Railway Act 1881
- Act of Parliament
- Parliament of the United Kingdom
- Long title: An Act for making a Railway from Appledore to Lydd, in the county of Kent, and for other purposes.
- Citation: 44 & 45 Vict. c. v

Dates
- Royal assent: 8 April 1881

Text of statute as originally enacted

Lydd Railway (Extensions) Act 1882
- Act of Parliament
- Parliament of the United Kingdom
- Long title: An Act to authorise the Lydd Railway Company to extend their railway to Headcorn and New Romney in the county of Kent to raise further money; and for other purposes.
- Citation: 45 & 46 Vict. c. clv

Dates
- Royal assent: 24 July 1882

Text of statute as originally enacted

Lydd Railway (Extension) Act 1883
- Act of Parliament
- Parliament of the United Kingdom
- Long title: An Act to authorise the Lydd Railway Company to make a Railway from Loose to Headcom in the County of Kent to raise further money and for other purposes.
- Citation: 46 & 47 Vict. c. cli

Dates
- Royal assent: 2 August 1883

Lydd Railway (Various Powers) Act 1885
- Act of Parliament
- Parliament of the United Kingdom
- Long title: An Act to confer upon the Lydd Railway Company further powers with reference to their own undertaking and for other purposes.
- Citation: 48 & 49 Vict. c. lxxxiii

Dates
- Royal assent: 16 July 1885

Text of statute as originally enacted

The development of the artillery range at Lydd increased the potential for traffic, so the newly formed Lydd Railway proposed their own bill to work on the Appledore–Lydd branch line, which was passed as the Lydd Railway Act 1881 (44 & 45 Vict. c. v). The Lydd Railway Company was promoted by Robert William Perks. Construction began on 8 April 1881, with Thomas Andrew Walker as the contractor for the work, and the line opened to Dungeness on 7 December that year. (Note: The line was freight-only beyond Lydd; full passenger services to Dungeness opened on 1 April 1883) Most trains ran through to Ashford, though a few services terminated at Appledore. An act for the northward branch to New Romney was granted on 24 July 1882, with the line opening on 19 June 1884. The line was not a financial success and the Lydd Railway was absorbed into the SER in 1895.

By the early 20th century, trains were running direct from Charing Cross to New Romney, via Ashford and Appledore, on summer Sundays. The branch line became important during World War I, when camps were established on the shingle wasteland between Lydd and Dungeness. During this time, the line catered for both infantry and horse traffic. A passing loop past Appledore was removed in 1920. At the New Romney end, one of the sidings adjoining the station was extended to serve the Romney, Hythe and Dymchurch Railway.

The line was realigned to be closer to the coast in the 1930s, to attract holiday traffic along the coast between Dungeness and New Romney. The rerouted line opened on 4 July 1937 and included new stations at Lydd-on-Sea and Greatstone-on-Sea. At the same time, the branch to Dungeness was closed to passengers. By 1952, nine trains a day were serving New Romney from Appledore, with two further through trains from Ashford. After electrification of the South East Main Line in 1962, direct services from Charing Cross were discontinued and the remaining services were run on diesel-electric stock.

=== Later improvements ===
Hastings was poorly served by the railway, as many of the residential areas to the east of the town centre were some distance from the station. In 1872, the SER considered building a new station, but progress stalled until July 1886, when a local landowner offered £1,000 (£112,377 in 2025) to build a station near Ore Tunnel. Ore railway station opened on 1 January 1888.

The original swing bridge over the River Rother east of Rye was proposed to be replaced by a fixed bridge in 1881. The SER were amenable to this as the Monk Bretton Bridge (that now carries the A259 east of Rye) was in planning stages, though the replacement bridge did not open until 1903. In 1899, the SER and the London, Chatham and Dover Railway created the South Eastern and Chatham Railway (SE&CR) as a joint operation.

In 1907, a steam railcar service was introduced on the line in an attempt to increase local traffic. Three additional halts were constructed between Winchelsea and Hastings: Three Oaks, Guestling (later renamed Doleham) and Snailham, all of which opened on 1 July. Snailham Halt was inaccessible by public road and could only be reached by a rough track. The station was never modernised and retained its original wooden platforms. Steam railcar services were withdrawn in February 1920 and replaced with tank engines. Snailham Halt closed on 2 February 1959.

Following World War I, plans were put forward to construct a chord linking the line eastwards at Ashford towards Dover Priory. This would allow trains to run between Hastings and Dover without having to reverse. The plans stalled at the design stage and the link was never constructed.

At the start of 1923, the SER, LCDR and SE&CR amalgamated with other railways to form the Southern Railway as part of the Railways Act 1921. The line was electrified from Hastings to Ore in 1935 and electric services began on 7 July. This was done in order that trains could be serviced in a siding away from the centre of Hastings. The siding closed in May 1986. It was revived for the Kent electrification scheme Phase 2 of the British Railways Modernisation Plan in the early 1960s, which included some preparatory work such as a footbridge at Rye. The plans were later dropped.

A regular hourly service was introduced in 1959, with additional peak services. This schedule has been largely unchanged.

=== Threatened closure ===
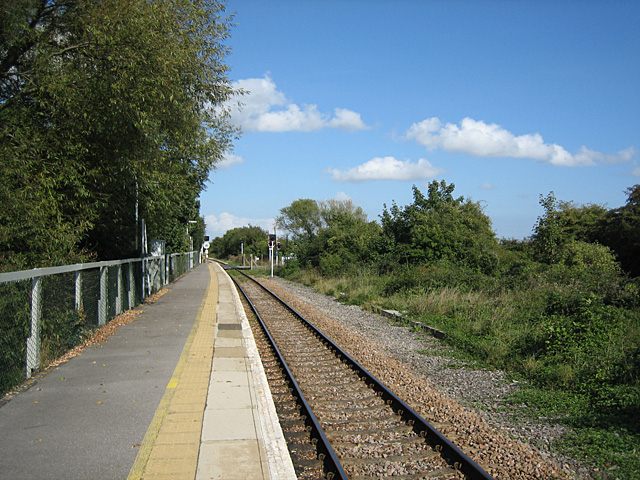
Since the Marshlink line was single-tracked in 1979, Winchelsea has only used one platform

The line was recommended for closure by Dr. Richard Beeching in the 1963 Beeching Report, as it attracted less than 10,000 passengers a week. Like other lines threatened with closure, there was strong opposition and the route survived because the nearby road network made it impractical to run a replacement bus service. The parallel A259 from Hastings to Brenzett had several level crossings over the line and a hairpin bend at Winchelsea, all of which are extant.

The local MP for Rye, Bryant Godman Irvine, made a significant Commons speech complaining about the decision to close the line. As well as the A259, he complained that a lack of rail service would cause problems for holidaymakers, children getting to school and freight. He also discovered a bus took an hour to travel 19 miles (31 km) between Rye and Ashford. To save money and prevent closure, the main line was temporarily single-tracked between Appledore and Ore from June 1965, which lasted until September 1966.

On 23 February 1966, the Ministry of Transport confirmed the branch to New Romney would close to passengers, which happened on 6 March 1967. It was kept open for freight as far as a nuclear flask loading and unloading point just outside Dungeness. This branch continues to run a regular service for this purpose and occasional special passenger trains have been operated for rail enthusiasts. Shortly afterwards, John Morris, Parliamentary Under-Secretary of State for the Ministry of Transport, said that the remaining line was under review and would not close without further advice. Transport minister Michael Heseltine said a condition of the line closing would be improvements to buses from Ashford to Ore.

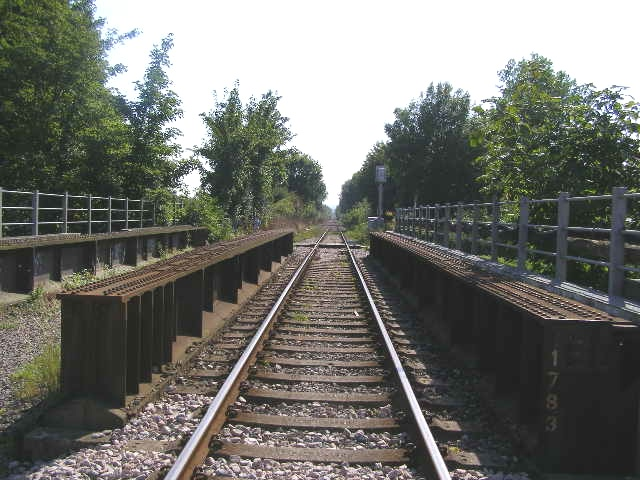
The Marshlink line is mostly single-tracked between Appledore and Ore. At the River Tillingham bridge in Rye shown, it is clear where the second track once ran

In 1969, The Railway Magazine wrote that the line would close completely at the end of the year; the Kent Messenger stated the same in 1971, as did The Times which also reported the railway was losing around £130,000 a year. The Mayors of Rye and Winchelsea disputed these figures and pointed out that the line was the fastest connection between the Channel ports and the Sussex coast, and the figures did not include passengers buying tickets at other stations and using the line for part of their journey.

In December 1973, the Secretary of State for the Environment, John Peyton said the line's future was being discussed with the local county councils. On 31 July of the following year, the ministry recommended the line for closure but stated that services would run indefinitely for the foreseeable future.

The line was single-tracked between Appledore and Ore on 1 October 1979, leaving a passing loop at Rye, in order to reduce maintenance and operational costs. At Winchelsea, the down platform was removed; trains in both directions now stop on the former up platform. The overall line speed was reduced from 85 to 60 mph. Long-term speed restrictions were put in place, including 40 mph between Doleham and Ore and 20 mph across a half barrier level crossing at Winchelsea. The restrictions mean that services along the Marshlink line do not make optimum use of the rolling stock, which has a top speed of 100 miles per hour (160 km/h).

The construction of the Channel Tunnel reopened discussions about electrification. In 1990, Network SouthEast hoped to have work complete within four years. In January 1992, the Minister for Public Transport, Roger Freeman, announced plans for British Rail to start electrification by 1995.

=== Privatisation ===
Following the privatisation of British Rail, the line was operated by Connex South Eastern from 1996, later transferring to Connex South Central. After Eurostar services began stopping at Ashford International in 1996, direct services were introduced on the Marshlink line beyond Hastings to Eastbourne and Brighton for the first time in 60 years.

By 1998, traffic on the line had improved by around 17–20%. In 2000, Connex lost its rail franchise following criticism of its management and performance. Norman Baker, MP for Lewes described a Marshlink service as "a 1954 diesel train, which shunts along like Thomas the Tank Engine at about 10 mph from Ashford to Hastings." The franchise was awarded to Govia, taking over operations in 2001; it was rebranded as Southern two years later.

The line closed for nine weeks between January and March 2012 for essential repair work to Ore tunnel, which was at risk of seeping water. The embankment between Ashford International and Ham Street was repaired, and the bridges next to Doleham and Three Oaks were rebuilt. There was also maintenance to signals to increase train speeds along the line. Network Rail planned to complete the work before patronage increased during the summer. The closure was criticised by MPs whose constituencies the line ran through, who questioned why the entire line had to close in one go as opposed to individual sections at a time. A peak-time shuttle service between Ashford and Rye was cancelled in 2020.

From 2001, there were proposals to build an additional station at Park Farm, between Ashford International and Ham Street. These were strengthened by the development of the new Finberry estate to the southeast of Ashford. In December 2018, Ashford Borough Council concluded it was not economically viable or practical to build the station.

In May 2018, Southern announced that services to Brighton would terminate at Eastbourne instead. The company said it would improve capacity between Eastbourne and Hastings, and remove a two-carriage diesel service from the electrified and often overcrowded Brighton–Eastbourne line, but it was criticised by various councillors whose wards lay on the route.

== Listed buildings ==
The Marshlink line contains several listed buildings along its route, which show architectural or historical merit. The original station buildings were designed by William Tress for the SER and constructed in an Italianate style. As Rye was planned to be a main stop, its station is larger than others along the line.

	Location	Grade	Date listed	Notes
Railway bridge over a main road	Queen's Road Bridge, Hastings	II	14 September 1976	Constructed in 1898 to replace the original SER road tunnel which restricted traffic
Front of a station building	Rye railway station	II	11 April 1980	
Front of a cottage	Gatekeeper's cottage, Rye	II	22 September 1987	The cottage lies to the north-west of the Rope Walk level crossing, east of Rye station.
View of a track alongside a station building	Appledore station and goods shed	II	2 July 2001	At the time of listing, the main station building had been boarded up and was largely architecturally unchanged since its original 1851 build.
View of a station building	Ham Street station	II	9 May 2005	
A signal box	Rye signal box	II	18 July 2013	One of only two Saxby & Farmer Type 12 signal boxes still standing (the other is at Wateringbury)

== Accidents and incidents ==
Accidents occurring at Ashford and Hastings stations are not covered.

- On 30 April 1852, driver John Hadley was killed at Ham Street station when he went to inspect a locomotive boiler which exploded as he approached it.
- On 27 December 1898, eight passengers were injured when a horse box was roughly shunted and collided with the passenger train it was to be attached to at Appledore.
- On 14 March 1980, an empty stock train comprising five Hastings Unit vehicles derailed at Appledore due to excessive speed through a set of points. The driver was killed. A motor coach was consequently withdrawn from service due to extensive damage.
- On 26 April 1984, a train carrying a nuclear flask on the Dungeness goods branch hit a car on an open level crossing close to Brookland. The line had a speed limit of 5 miles per hour (8.0 km/h) and no damage was done to the flask, though the carrying locomotive was slightly damaged. The occupants of the car did not suffer any serious injuries.

== Route ==
The line starts at Ashford International, a major interchange in Kent connecting it to High Speed 1 and the South Eastern Main Line. Services run southwards from Platforms 1 and 2. Following a brief section of single-track immediately after a branch from the South Eastern Main Line, the line is then double-track. After 6 1/2 miles (10.5 km), it descends on a 1 in 100 (10‰) gradient towards Ham Street (previously Ham Street & Orlsetone), crossing the Royal Military Canal and entering Romney Marsh towards Appledore. (Note: The station's formal name includes (Kent) in its title, although Appledore (Devon) station closed in 1917.) The next 13 miles (21 km) through Romney Marsh and the Brede Valley are level track, aside from a handful of river crossings.

South of Appledore, a freight-only branch line diverges to serve Dungeness nuclear power station. The branch originally served New Romney, Brookland Halt, Lydd Town, Lydd-on-Sea Halt, Greatstone-on-Sea Halt, New Romney and Littlestone-on-Sea and Dungeness.

Beyond Appledore, the line reduces to single-track and crosses the River Rother to Rye where there is a disused branch to Rye Harbour. The main line continues to Winchelsea along the Brede Valley, then climbs uphill at 1 in 90 (11.1‰). It passes through the former Snailham Halt (closed in 1959), Doleham and Three Oaks before entering the 1,402-yard (1,282 m) Ore Tunnel.

After the tunnel, the line is double-track and electrified (originally for access to the carriage sidings at Ore but since their removal the lines are used by scheduled trains). After Ore, the line enters the 230-yard (210 m) Mount Pleasant Tunnel before a 1 in 60 (16.7‰) descent towards Hastings. From here, the track becomes the East Coastway line. Throughout, the line does not follow any particular main vehicle route.

== Services ==
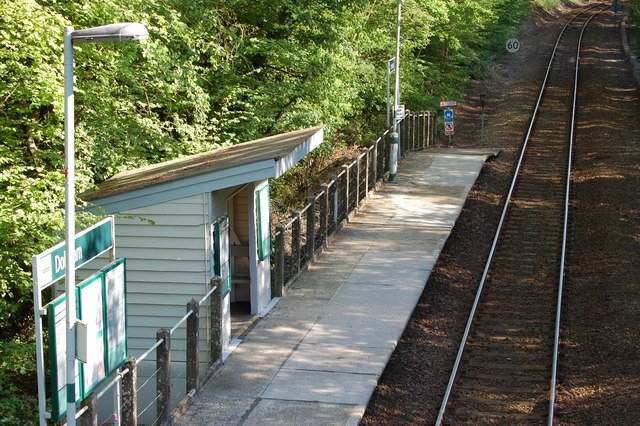
Doleham has a very limited service on the Marshlink line

Passenger services are operated by Southern, while freight services to Dungeness are run by Direct Rail Services.

Trains run hourly between Ashford International and Hastings, stopping at Ham Street, Appledore, Rye, Winchelsea and Three Oaks. The latter two stations were served every two hours alternately, until a timetable upgrade in May 2023. Doleham (between Winchelsea and Three Oaks) is served by just three or four trains per day each way.

Trains then stop at Ore and Hastings before continuing on the East Coastway line towards Eastbourne. Ore station, in addition to Ashford-Eastbourne services, receives services to Brighton and London Victoria (hourly to each), which start or terminate there.

Ham Street, Appledore and Rye have staggered platforms; passengers could originally cross the line between them, but this has now been disallowed for safety reasons. (Note: The last crossing over the line at Ham Street was replaced by a footbridge in 2014 after several accidents.)

Platforms at Three Oaks and Doleham can only accommodate a single carriage and passengers wishing to alight must travel in a particular carriage of the train.

== Rolling stock ==
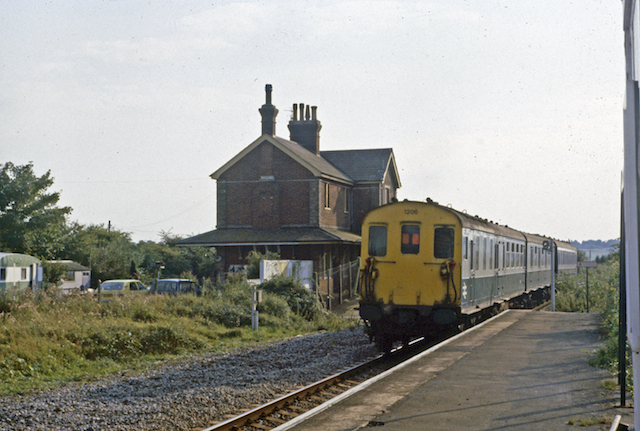
A Class 206 at Winchelsea station in 1982

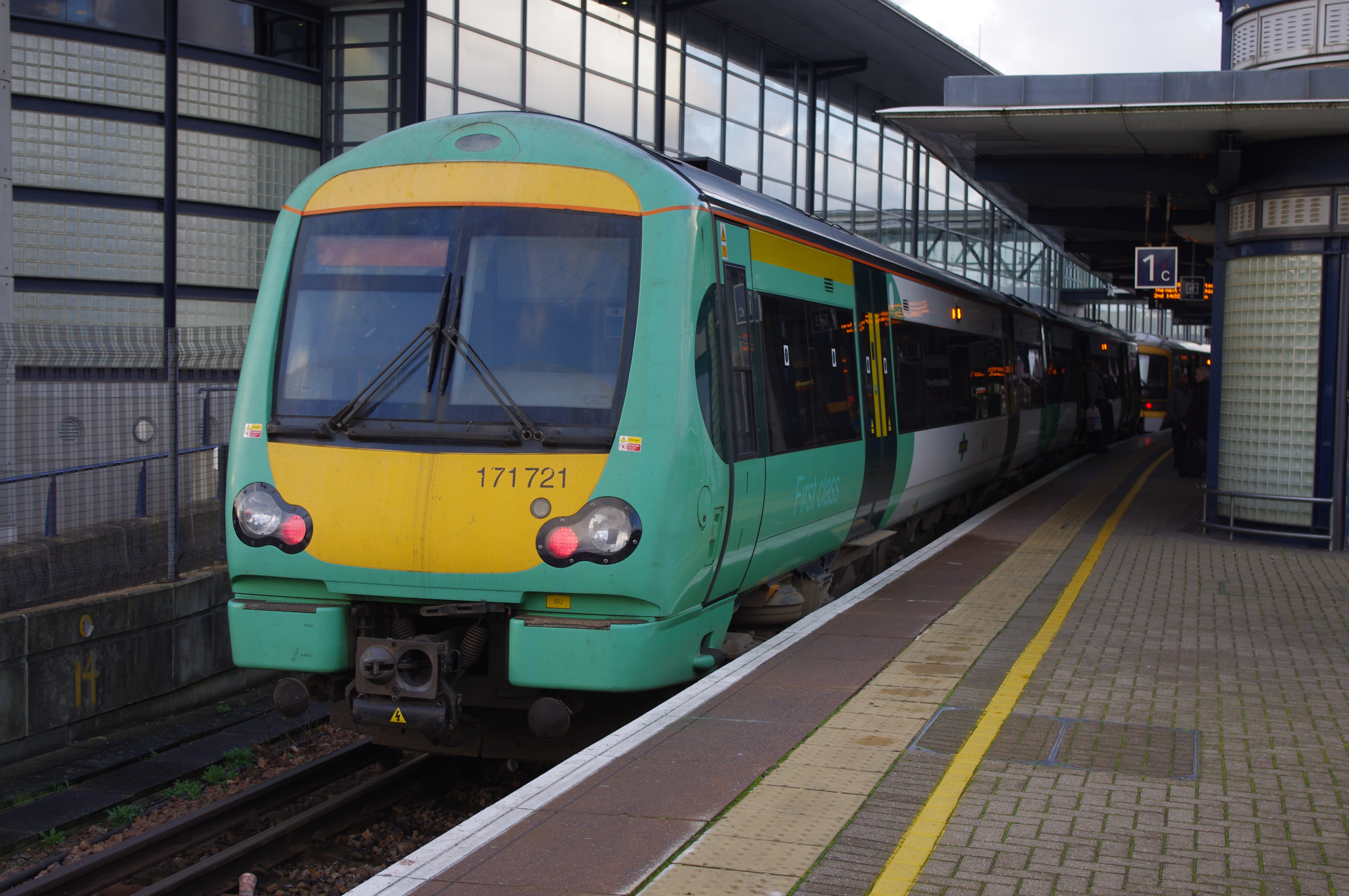
A Class 171 DMU at Ashford International

Since the Marshlink line is not electrified from Ashford to Ore, it uses different rolling stock from most of the nearby rail network. The line was originally operated by 4-4-0 locomotives. When the railmotor service was introduced, it used stock from Kitson and Company; following the failure of this service, the line switched to using a variety of tank engines. By 1962, Thumper DMUs had been introduced, replacing steam services. By the late 1970s, Class 206 units were running on the line.

Southern planned to withdraw this rolling stock after completing electrification of its remaining diesel lines, but the Strategic Rail Authority rejected the £150 million cost as prohibitive; the company introduced Class 171 Turbostar DMUs instead. The short section from Ore to Hastings is electrified and, in addition to the Class 171s, sees services using electric multiple units such as Class 377s.

The mostly diesel-only line prevents other rolling stock being used, including the Class 375 trains used elsewhere on the South East Main Line and the Class 395 Javelin trains on High Speed 1. In the event of a breakdown, the lack of available Class 171s can mean disruption or cancellation of services. The Class 171s are maintained at Southern's depot in Selhurst, some distance away from the line. In November 2017, the chief operating officer of Hitachi Rail Europe suggested the line could use Class 802 bi-mode trains, allowing direct running between HS1 and Hastings.

== Future ==
In 2015, Amber Rudd, MP for Hastings, campaigned for electrification to start within the next two years, which planned to reduce times to London from Hastings to 68 minutes and from Rye to under an hour. This would require remodelling Ashford International to connect the Marshlink line to HS1, installing power systems and adding a grade-separated diversion from Rye to the west, in addition to new trains. An alternative proposal was put forward in 2016 that involved bi-mode trains, which would not require electrification of the Marshlink Line. The two level crossings with the A259 have been criticised as being inadequate and a decision would be required with the Highways Agency, which manages the road, as to what work is required to make the upgrades go ahead.

The Marshlink Action Group is a volunteer group set up in 2003 in the interests of passengers using the line. The group are concerned about the line's future, particularly the use of Class 171 DMUs. They have reported that a high proportion of children and the elderly use the line, compared to others in the south-east, and a lack of additional rolling stock.

In 2016, Rudd chaired a working group to look at short and long-term plans for upgrading the line, including the potential accommodation of Class 395 rolling stock. A report from Network Rail in 2016 suggested that third-rail electrification would cost around £100–250 million and overhead electrification would cost between £250 and £500 million.

In May 2018, the Department for Transport allocated £200,000 for further electrification design, with the possibility of completion in 2022 when the existing track life-expires. This provided the possibility of travelling from Ashford to Hastings in 20 minutes.

In early 2021, Kent County Council wrote a strategic outline business case (SOBC) to the government for electrifying the line and track changes at Ashford. Later that year, Network Rail made two proposals: one with bi-mode trains estimated at £153m-£198m, the other recommending third-rail electrification costed at £434m–£557m; an extra platform at Ashford International (2a) was included in these plans. Both proposals required closing the Ore Tunnel for six months.
