= Rye (disambiguation) =

Rye is a cereal crop.

Rye may also refer to:

- Rye whiskey, made primarily from rye grain
- Rye bread, made with rye flour

== Places ==
=== Settlements ===
==== United Kingdom ====
- Rye, East Sussex, England
  - Rye (UK Parliament constituency), former constituency
- Rye, Hampshire

==== United States ====
- Rye, Arizona
- Rye, Arkansas
- Rye, Colorado
- Rye, Florida
- Rye, New Hampshire
- Rye (city), New York
- Town of Rye, New York
- Rye, Texas

==== Elsewhere ====
- Rye, Victoria, Australia
- Old Rye (Gammel Rye), Denmark
- Rye, Jura, France
- Langørjan, also known as Rye, Norway

=== Streams ===
- River Rye (disambiguation), two rivers in the British Isles
- The Rye (brook), a tributary of the River Mole in Surrey, England

== Transportation ==
- Rye railway station (disambiguation)
- Sportsklubben Rye, a cycling club in Oslo, Norway

== Other ==
- Rye (surname)
- Rye (novel), an erotic novel by Sam Rosenthal
- Ryegrass or Lolium, a bluegrass genus
- "The Rye", an episode of the TV series Seinfeld
- Rotary Youth Exchange, a student exchange program
- Roush-Yates Engines, a partnership between the engines divisions of RFK Racing and Yates Racing
- Rye (package manager), a tool for packaging and virtual environment management software in Python

== See also ==
- Rai (unit), unit of area
