= Monk Bretton Bridge =

Road bridge in Rye, East Sussex, England

Coordinates: 50°57′11″N 0°44′21″E

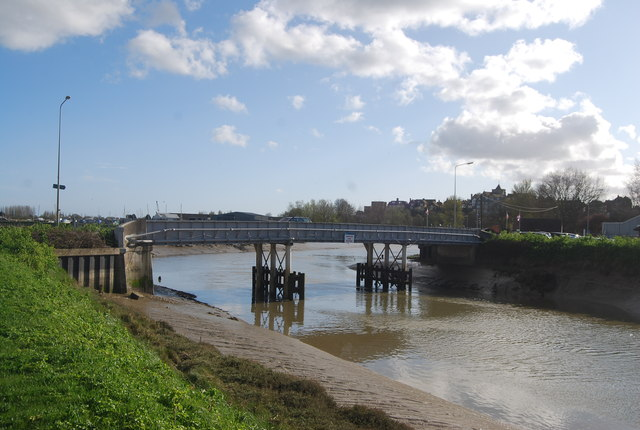
View of the bridge from the northeast

The Monk Bretton Bridge is a road bridge over the River Rother in Rye, East Sussex. It carries the A259 road, a major road between Folkestone and Hastings, and is the most downstream crossing of the river. The area around the river beyond this resembles saltmarsh compared to that further upstream.

The bridge was planned as a replacement for a ferry over the river that carried fisherman traffic from Camber and East Guldeford to the fish market at Rye. It opened on 25 April 1893 at a cost of £3,160 (£443,000 as of 2023) and was named after John George Dodson, 1st Baron Monk Bretton. The bridge was constructed by a deck supported on two sets of iron piles. It was later reinforced with concrete.

The Rye and Camber Tramway opened in 1895, with the Rye station located east of the River Rother. It did not connect to the main railway line (now the Marshlink line); instead passengers travelled between the two stations via the Monk Bretton Bridge.

The bridge was closed in October 2007 for refurbishment, involving lengthy detours.
