= Rye railway station =

Rye railway station or Rye station may also refer to:

- Rye railway station (East Sussex), in Rye, East Sussex, England
- Rye station (Metro-North), in Rye, New York, United States
- Rye railway station (Rye and Camber Tramway), a former station in Rye, East Sussex, England

== See also ==
- Peckham Rye railway station in London, England.
- Rye House railway station in Rye House, Hertfordshire, England
