= Rye Water =

Rye Water may refer to:

- River Rye (Ireland) (also Rye Water, Ryewater), tributary joining the River Liffey at Leixlip
- Rye Water, tributary of the River Garnock, Scotland
- Rye Water, racehorse, winner of the Yorkshire Oaks in 1928

== See also ==
- River Rye (disambiguation)
