= Ham Street =

Ham Street or Hamstreet may refer to two places in England:

- Ham Street, Somerset, a hamlet near Baltonsborough
- Hamstreet, a village in Kent
  - Ham Street railway station
