= Kent Construction and Engineering =

Kent Construction and Engineering Co., Ltd., of Victoria Works, Victoria Road, Ashford, Kent are best known for purchasing many former World War I War Department Light Railways locomotives at the end of the war, both narrow and standard gauge, and reselling them after repair and reconditioning using the "Planet" trademark. It went on to design its own locomotives, and one of the new designs was shown at the Public Works, Roads & Transport Exhibition at Islington in November, 1925, by Honeywill Brothers.

== Company history ==
The structure of the business is unclear. The locomotives were marketed by Honeywill Brothers of Ashford and London, who were described as "the people behind the Kent Construction Planet locomotive business". The Kent Construction business was wound up in 1926, the same year that Silas Honeywill died (1855–1926). Silas was step-brother to Ross and Constantine Honeywill of Honeywill Brothers Ltd. Ross Honeywill (actually William Ross Honeywill) died in August 1927 as a result of injuries sustained in a train crash on the Southern Railway in an accident known at the time as the Riverhead Disaster. Honeywill Brothers are also known to have sold an ex-WDLR Baldwin locomotive to the Ffestiniog Railway from E.W. Farrow & Sons (of Spalding), who were known as a seller of surplus army supplies after World War I, so it appears Honeywill Brothers held a wider role in the marketing of army surplus equipment.

Kent Construction and Engineering were also involved in screw manufacture, as in April 1926 a new company, Recess Screws (1926) Ltd of Gillingham, Kent, was formed which had acquired certain plant and effects of the "Kent Construction and Engineering company, screw manufacturer". Kent Construction and Engineering Co were also involved in agricultural equipment, and in August 1927 a notice regarding the voluntary liquidation of the company listed a large number of agricultural items for sale from the premisies at Elwick Road, Ashford. This included own brand items such as Kent Construction Corn Mill, and Planet Junior Allotment Hoe, among a wide range of agricultural machinery. The equipment involved in the sale of the Elwick Road agricultural engineering business, has a large overlap with the equipment listed in adverts by Frederick Clark & Co agricultural engineers of Elwick Iron Works, which ran into trouble in 1923 and entered into voluntary liquidation in 1925.

The railway locomotive business was clearly still seen as attractive, and two of the directors of Honeywill Brothers Ltd, F.C.Hibberd and D.A. Dwyer, created the new company FC Hibberd & Company who acquired the locomotive rights and the entire locomotive stock of Kent Construction and Engineering Company, but not the Ashford works (which was rented from the Southern Railway). They continued to use the "Planet" trademark and sub-contracted manufacture to two different companies before getting their own works in Park Royal, London in 1932. Hibberd locomotives continued in production until 1968.

== Locomotive types ==
When World War I ended in 1918, a large number of railway locomotives were repatriated from the War Department Light Railways (WDLR), plus there were some that were still in England waiting to be despatched, and the Honeywill Brothers/Kent Construction combination acquired a large number of these and started a business of refurbishing them and selling them on to industry. They also purchased a great stock of War Office parts for these locomotives required to maintain them under war conditions. Those locos that had never left the country were effectively brand new, but others would have needed different degrees of servicing or repair. Kent Construction sold these locomotives under the "Planet" trademark, and in the case of the most numerous, the 20 hp Motor Rail bow-framed "Simplex" locomotives, all the cast parts with the Simplex mark were replaced by similar castings with the Planet mark. While the most numerous were the smaller Motor Rail Locos, this same practice applied to other makes, such as American Baldwin petrol locomotives, and the standard gauge Motor Rail shunters. This form of 'badge engineering' has caused some difficulties in identifying preserved locomotives which may have true WW1 origins lost by the reprocessing and rebadging operations of Kent Contructiuon and Engineering.

As time progressed Kent Construction moved more to creating their own locomotives, though still following the Motor Rail design (and drawing on the stock of parts), though in 1925 they launched their own locomotive design, with the engine aligned with the tracks, rather than being transverse. These were made both in narrow-gauge form and in standard gauge as works shunters, and the design was continued by Hibberd and several of the Hibberd locos still survive.

While production records for Kent Construction and Engineering don't exist, the Hibberd locomotive serial numbers may well have followed the same sequence. A well documented Kent Construction locomotive used by the 3 foot gauge Rye and Camber Tramway between the wars was No 1364 of 1924, the earliest surviving Hibberd, No 1568, dates from 1927, and Hibberd No 1612 dates to 1929 (this is the preserved Standard Gauge locomotive originally operated by Worthington Brewery).

== Preserved locomotives ==
The only standard gauge surviving Kent Construction loco seems to be one made in 1926 for the Worthington Brewery of Burton upon Trent. This was originally fitted with a 40HP Dorman 4JO petrol engine, Outwardly similar Hibberd-built locos also survive, including one sold to the same company.

A surviving ex-WDLR narrow-gauge loco is "Mary Ann" on the Ffestiniog Railway. This 40HP petrol locomotive was bought from Kent Construction and Engineering in 1923, but is believed to be a reconditioned WDLR loco from 1917, or maybe parts from two or more locos mixed together by Kent Construction. Also on the Ffestiniog Railway is "Moelwyn", a Baldwin locomotive formerly a petrol loco from 1918, which was purchased in February 1925 from E. W. Farrow & Sons of Spalding through Honeywill Brothers. Kent Construction and Engineering Co are also known to have had World War I Baldwin petrol locomotives, though it is not thought any of theirs have survived to preservation.
