= A259 road =

Road in England

A259

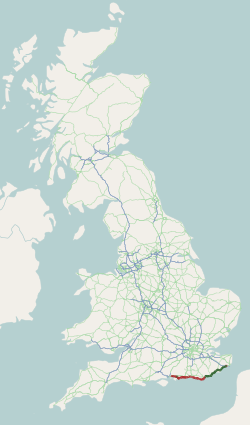

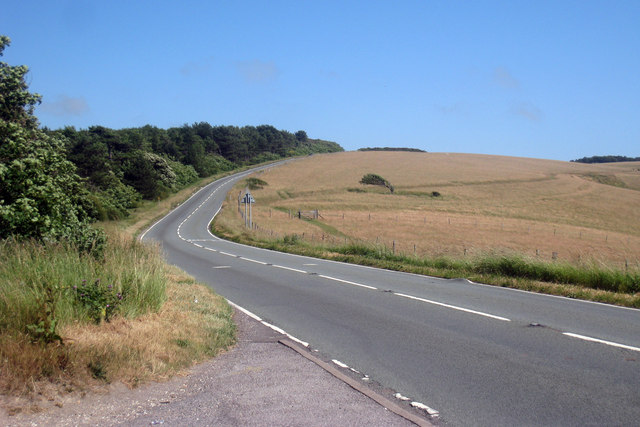
- A259 Eastbourne Road

Route information
- Length: 118.5 mi (190.7 km)

Major junctions
- East end: Folkestone
- M20; A20 A260 A2033 A2034 A2070 A268 A2101; A21 A2102 A2036 A269 A2690; A27 A2290 A2021 A2040 A2270; A26; A29; A23 A2010 A2023 A283; A24 A2032 A280 A284 A286
- West end: Emsworth

Location
- Country: United Kingdom
- Primary destinations: Bexhill-on-Sea; Bognor Regis; Brighton; Chichester; Eastbourne; Folkestone; Hastings; Littlehampton; Rye; Shoreham-by-Sea; Worthing

Road network
- Roads in the United Kingdom; Motorways; A and B road zones

The A259 is a road on the south coast of England passing through Hampshire, West Sussex, East Sussex, and Kent, and is the longest Zone 2 A road in Great Britain. The main part of the road connects Brighton, Peacehaven, Eastbourne, Hastings, Rye, and Folkestone.

The road is below the expected standard of a trunk road used by HGVs and a frequent cause of congestion and disruption and has been documented as one of the most dangerous roads in southern England.

== Description ==
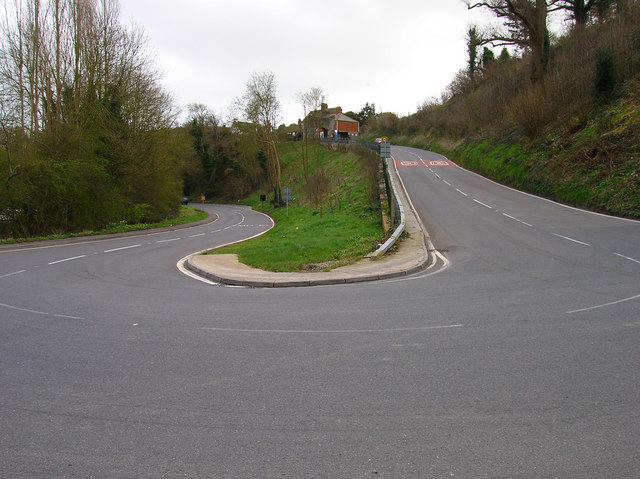
A hairpin bend on the trunk road section of the A259 near Winchelsea

The A259 is a busy two-lane road running along the south coast of England; part is roughly parallel to the A27 road. The A259 runs east from Emsworth in Hampshire, into West Sussex via Chichester, Bognor Regis, Littlehampton, Ferring, Worthing, Lancing, Shoreham-by-Sea, into the Unitary Authority of Brighton and Hove which incorporates Portslade, Hove and Brighton, and on into the East Sussex towns of Peacehaven, Newhaven, Seaford, Eastbourne, Pevensey, Bexhill-on-Sea, Hastings and Rye. The road passes through Winchelsea, England's first new town. Over the border in Kent, it continues through New Romney and Hythe to terminate at Folkestone.

The road has two sections with trunk road status (between Bognor Regis and Chichester, and between Pevensey and the A2070 at Brenzett) and formed part of the formerly designated South Coast Trunk Road. This section of A259 is almost entirely a single-carriageway, with only a short stretch of urban dual-carriageway in Bexhill. There is also a section of dual carriageway between Worthing's Titnore roundabout and the Lyminster bypass roundabout.

Landmarks on the A259 include Shoreham Power Station, West Pier, and the Palace Pier in Brighton, Telscombe Cliffs near Peacehaven, and Saltdean, Cuckmere Haven between Seaford and Eastbourne and the Romney, Hythe and Dymchurch Railway which shares the route for 8 miles (13 km) from New Romney to Hythe.

== Major Junctions ==
County	Location	mi	km	Destinations	Notes
Hampshire	Emsworth	0.0	0.0	A27 (Havant Bypass) – Portsmouth, Chichester, Warblington Church	Western terminus
Hampshire	Emsworth	1.2	1.9	B2148 north (North Street) – Horndean, Rowlands Castle, Town Centre, Westbourne	
Hampshire	Emsworth	1.4	2.3	Queen Street - Town Centre	
West Sussex	Southbourne	2.5	4.0	Sein Road - Woodmancote	
West Sussex	Nutbourne	3.7	6.0	Broad Road - Hambrook	
West Sussex	Bosham	5	8.0	B 2146; West Ashling, East Ashling, Funtington; Delling Lane; Bosham, Church, Quay	
West Sussex	Fishbourne	7.3	11.7	Appledram Lane - Apuldram, Dell Quay	
West Sussex	Chichester	7.4	11.9	A27 (Fishbourne Roundabout) – Portsmouth, Havant, Brighton, Bognor Regis	
West Sussex	Chichester	8.3	13.4	A286 (Chichester Ring Road) – Midhurst	The A286 and A259 run together as the Chichester Ring Road, though signs prioritise the A286
West Sussex	Chichester	8.5	13.7	A259 (Southgate Gyratory) to A286 Witterings	Part of the A286
West Sussex	Chichester	8.9	14.3	A259 (Eastgate) to A286 / A285 Witterings, Worthing	End of the joint A286-A259
West Sussex	Chichester	9.4	15.1	B2145 (Whyke Road) – Selsey	
West Sussex	Chichester	10	16	A27 (Bognor Road Roundabout) – Brighton, Worthing, Portsmouth	
West Sussex	Drayton	11	18	B2144 (Drayton Lane) - Drayton, Oving, Shopwyke	
West Sussex	Bognor Regis	13.1	21.1	B2259 (Chichester Road) – Bersted, Pagham	
West Sussex	Bognor Regis	14.3	23.0	Rowan Way - Bersted, Pagham	
West Sussex	Bognor Regis	15.2	24.5	A29 (Oldlands Way Roundabout) – Billingshurst, Fontwell, Westergate, Shripney, Bognor Regis	Briefly joins with the A29
West Sussex	Bognor Regis	15.4	24.8	A29 (Shirpney Road) – Billingshurst, Pulborough, Shripney	
West Sussex	Yapton	17.9	28.8	B2259 (Flansham Lane) – Middleton-on-Sea, Felpham	
West Sussex	Middleton-on-Sea	18.7	30.1	B2132 (Yapton Road) – Middleton-on-Sea, Yapton, Barnham	
West Sussex	Climping	19.3	31.1	B2223 (Yapton Road) – Yapton, Barnham	
West Sussex	Wick	20.7	33.3	B2187 (Bridge Road Roundabout) – Littlehampton	
West Sussex	Wick	21.8	35.1	A284 (Wick Roundabout) – Arundel, Lyminster, Town Centre	
West Sussex	Littlehampton	22.5	36.2	B2187 (The Body Shop Roundabout) – Rustington, Littlehampton	
West Sussex	Rustington	24.1	38.8	B2187 (Mill Lane Roundabout) – Rustington	
West Sussex	Angmering	24.6	39.6	B2140 (Blue Star Roundabout) – Angmering, East Preston	
West Sussex	Angmering	25	40	(Roundstone Road Roundabout) - East Preston	
West Sussex	Angmering	25.5	41.0	A280 (Roundstone Roundabout) / B2140 – Horsham, Brighton, Chichester, East Preston	
West Sussex	Goring-by-Sea	26.8	43.1	A2032 (Goring Crossways Roundabout) – Brighton, Arundel, West Durrington	
West Sussex	Goring-by-Sea	27.4	44.1	(Goring Way) - Ferring	
West Sussex	Worthing	30.3	48.8	A24 (Chapel Road) – London, Portsmouth	southern terminus of A24
West Sussex	Worthing	30.4	48.9	A24 – London, Portsmouth	
West Sussex	Lancing	32.8	52.8	A2025 (South Street) – London, Brighton	
West Sussex	Shoreham-by-Sea	34.5	55.5	A289 (High Street) – Horsham, Steyning	
Brighton & Hove	Fishersgate	37.4	60.2	A293 (Church Road) to A23 / A27 – London, Lewes, Worthing	
Brighton & Hove	Portslade	37.7	60.7	B2194 (Station Road) to A23 / A27 – London, Lewes	
Brighton & Hove	Hove	39	63	A2023 (Hove Street) to A23 / A27 – London, Lewes, Central Hove	
Brighton & Hove	Hove	39.5	63.6	B2185 (Grand Avenue) to A23 / A27 – London, Lewes	
Brighton & Hove	Brighton	40.9	65.8	A23 (Old Steine) – London	
Brighton & Hove	Brighton	41.2	66.3	(Lower Rock Gardens) - Brighton Racecourse	
Brighton & Hove	Brighton	41.8	67.3	(Eaton Place) - Royal Sussex County Hospital	
Brighton & Hove	Brighton	42.8	68.9	(Marina Drive) - Brighton Marina	eastbound access as u-turn on Marina Drive; westbound access as slip road
Brighton & Hove	Brighton	43.1	69.4	B2066 (Roedean Road) - East Brighton Golf Club	
Brighton & Hove	Brighton	44	71	(Greenways) - Ovingdean	
Brighton & Hove	Rottingdean	44.7	71.9	B2123 (High Street) – Woodingdean	
East Sussex	Newhaven	49.7	80.0	(Lewes Road) - Piddinghoe, Rodmell, Kingston (North Lane) - Town Centre: Denton Island	
East Sussex	Newhaven	50.2	80.8	A26 (New Road) – London, Lewes, Eastbourne, Brighton	
East Sussex	Newhaven	50.3	81.0	B2109 (Drove Road) / A26 – London, Lewes, Eastbourne, Brighton, Newhaven Harbour	
East Sussex	Newhaven	50.5	81.3	B2109 (Avis Road) - Denton, Paradise Park and Gardens	
East Sussex	Bishopstone	51.9	83.5	(Bishopstone Road) - Bishopstone	
East Sussex	Seaford	53.3	85.8	(Avondale Road) - East Blatchington	
East Sussex	Seaford	53.9	86.7	(Alfriston Road) - Alfriston, Drusillas Park	
East Sussex	Seaford	54.3	87.4	(Sutton Avenue) - Seaford Head Golf Course	
East Sussex	Exceat	55.5	89.3	(Litlington Road) - Westdean, Litlington	
East Sussex	East Dean	57.8	93.0	(Old Willingdon Road) - Jevington	
East Sussex	East Dean	58.3	93.8	(Gilberts Drive) - Birling Gap, Beachy Head	
East Sussex	South Downs Hills	59.6	95.9	B2103 (Warren Hill) – Beachy Head	
East Sussex	Eastbourne	60.9	98.0	To A2270 (Victoria Drive) – Polegate, Willingdon	
East Sussex	Eastbourne	61.5	99.0	A2270 (Upperton Road) to A22 / A27 – London, Brighton, Hastings	
East Sussex	Eastbourne	61.7	99.3	To A259 (The Avenue) – Eastbourne District General Hospital, Pevensey Bay	
East Sussex	Eastbourne	63.2	101.7	(Whitley Road) - Eastbourne District General Hospital	
East Sussex	Eastbourne	63.9	102.8	A2290 (Seaside Roundabout) to A22 / A27 – London, Brighton, Hastings, Sovereign Harbour (South)	
East Sussex	Eastbourne	64.5	103.8	B2104 (Langney Roundabout) to B2191 – Hailsham, Pevensey, Sovereign Harbour (South)	
East Sussex	Pevensey Bay	66.7	107.3	(Coast Road) - Beachlands	The A259 loops around back towards Eastbourne here
East Sussex	Pevensey	67.5	108.6	B2191 (High Street) – Westham, Stone Cross, Pevensey Castle	
East Sussex	Pevensey	67.7	109.0	A27 (Pevensey Roundabout) to A22 – London, Brighton, Normans Bay, Eastbourne, Polegate, Lewes, Wartling, Herstmonceux Castle, Pevensey Services	eastern terminus of A27
East Sussex	Pevensey Marshlands	70.1	112.8	B2095 – Ninfield, Battle, Hooe	Hooe signposted westbound only.
East Sussex	Pevensey Marshlands	70.6	113.6	(Green Lane) - Hooe	
East Sussex	Bexhill-on-Sea	72.7	117.0	Little Common Roundabout; Peartree Lane - Ninfield, Catsfield (Cooden Beach Sea Road) - Cooden Beach station, Cooden Beach	Trucks over 7.5 tonnes prohibited from Peartree Lane and Chestnut Walk
East Sussex	Bexhill-on-Sea	73.8	118.8	B2098 (Sutherland Avenue) - Bexhill station, Town Centre	
East Sussex	Bexhill-on-Sea	74.3	119.6	A269 (Combe Valley Way / London Road) to A21 / A2100 – London, Battle, Conquest Hospital, Town Centre	
East Sussex	Bexhill-on-Sea	75	121	A269 (Dorset Road) - Town Centre	
East Sussex	Bexhill-on-Sea	75.8	122.0	A2036 (Dorset Road) to A269 – Ninfield, Battle, Ravenside Retail Park	
East Sussex	Bulverhythe	77	124	B2092 (Harley Shute Road) – Crowhurst, Battle, Conquest Hospital	
East Sussex	Bulverhythe	77.4	124.6	To A21 (Filsham Road) / A2100 – London, Battle	
East Sussex	St Leonards-on-Sea	78.6	126.5	A2102 (London Road) to A21 / A2100 – London, Battle, St. Leonards Centre, Station	
East Sussex	Hastings	79.6	128.1	A2101 (Albert Road) to A21 – London	
East Sussex	Hastings	81	130	To A21 (Priory Road) / A259 – London, Ring Road	Vehicle height restriction of 3.6 metres.
East Sussex	Ore	81.6	131.3	B2093 (Old London Road) to A21 / A2100 – London, Battle	
East Sussex	near Guestling Green	82.8	133.3	(Friars Hill) - Pett, Fairlight	
East Sussex	Guestling	83.4	134.2	(Chapel Lane) - Pett, Fairlight	
East Sussex	Guestling Thorn	84.4	135.8	(Butcher's Lane) - Three Oaks, Westfield	
East Sussex	Guestling Thorn	84.5	136.0	(North Lane) - Doleham	
East Sussex	Northeast of Icklesham	88.1	141.8	(Monk's Walk) - Winchelsea	
East Sussex	Winchelsea	88.6	142.6	(Station Road) - Winchelsea station	
East Sussex	Winchelsea	89	143	(Sea Road) - Winchelsea Beach	
East Sussex	Rye	91	146	A268 (Kettle o'Fish Roundabout) to B2089 – Battle, Rye town centre	
East Sussex	Rye	91.7	147.6	A268 (Skinner Roundabout) to B2082 – Tenterden, Peasmarsh	
East Sussex	East Guldeford	92.6	149.0	(Camber Road) – Camber, Lydd Airport	
East Sussex	Between East Guldeford and Brookland	96.5	155.3	(Hook Wall) - Midley	
Kent	Brookland	97.9	157.6	(Straight Lane) - Brookland village centre	
Kent	Brenzett	99.2	159.6	To B2080 (Brenzett Roundabout) / M20 / A2070 – Tenterden, Snargate, Hamstreet, Ashford, Appledore	
Kent	Old Romney	101	163	(Five Vents Lane) - Ivychurch	
Kent	Between Old Romney and New Romney	102	164	B2075 (Romney Road) – Lydd Airport, Dungeness, Camber	
Kent	New Romney	103	166	(Ashford Road) - Ivychurch	
Kent	New Romney	104	167	B2071 (Station Road) – Littlestone	
Kent	New Romney	104	167	(St Mary's Road) - St. Mary in the Marsh, Newchurch	
Kent	St Mary's Bay	106	171	(Jefferstone Lane) - St. Mary in the Marsh	
Kent	Dymchurch	107	172	(Mill Road) - Newchurch, Bonnington, Aldington	
Kent	Dymchurch	108	174	(Burmarsh Road) - Burmarsh	
Kent	Palmarsh	110	180	(Botolph's Bridge Road) - Port Lympne Zoo Park	
Kent	Hythe	112	180	A261 (London Road) to A20 / M20 – Channel Tunnel, Dover, Lympne, Port Lympne Wild Animal Park	The A259 loops back around onto Dymchurch Road
Kent	Hythe	113	182	(High Street / Station Road) - Town Centre, Elham	
Kent	Hythe	114	183	B2063 (Hospital Hill) – Shorncliffe Garrison	
Kent	Folkestone	116	187	A2033 (Sandgate Road) – Town Centre	
Kent	Folkestone	117	188	A20 (Cheriton Road) to M20 / A260 – Ashford, Channel Tunnel, Dover, Canterbury	
Kent	Folkestone	117	188	To M20 (Black Bull Road) / A260 – Ashford, Channel Tunnel, Dover, Canterbury	
Kent	Folkestone	118	190	(Foord Road) - Folkestone Harbour, Town Centre	loops back to Radnor Park Road
Kent	Folkestone	118	190	(Foord Road) - Folkestone Harbour, Town Centre	loops back to Radnor Park Road
Kent	Folkestone	119	192	A260 / A20 / B2011 – Canterbury, Dover, Capel-le-Ferne, Hawkinge	
Kent	Folkestone	120	190	A260 (Castle Hill Interchange) / A20 / A2034 / M20 – Folkestone, Cheriton, Sandgate, London, Channel Tunnel, Ashford, Dover, Canterbury	eastern terminus
Kent	1.000 mi = 1.609 km; 1.000 km = 0.621 mi				

== Safety ==
In June 2008, a 12 miles (19 km) stretch of the A259 between Hastings and Eastbourne was named by EuroRAP as the most dangerous road in the South East of England. The report cited 47 fatal or serious collisions from 2004 to 2006 as a key issue. In 2011, the BBC named the road as the "most crash prone A road" in the UK with 7,721 crashes and 120 deaths over 12 years from 1999 to 2010, an average of 65 crashes per mile.

== Traffic ==
The road crosses the Marshlink line between Ashford International and Rye at two level crossings in quick succession. In the summer, this can create significant congestion where goods vehicles between the towns mix with day traffic to popular holiday destinations such as Camber Sands. Portions of the road along Romney Marsh suffer from subsidence into the dikes that run alongside the main carriageway.

== History ==
What is now the A259 east of Rye was developed after the opening of the Monk Bretton Bridge in 1893, which provided a quicker route through Romney Marsh. The original draft route of the A259 was from Dover to Eastbourne. It was extended westwards to Worthing after the local engineering division informed the Ministry of Transport they would like a single number to represent the coast road.

In 1989 the government proposed to dual the road from Pevensey to Bexhill and make other corridor improvements as detailed in their Roads for Prosperity white paper and would have included the following elements: 'Guestling and Icklesham bypass', the 'Winchelsea bypass', 'Rye bypass', 'Hamstreet bypass', 'A259 New Romney bypass' and the 'A259 St. Mary's Bay and Dymchurch bypass'. This scheme along with many others proposed at the time were shelved in 1996-7 after a number of major road protests in the UK. Of these only the Ham Street bypass (A2070) was eventually constructed.

Plans for a 'Hastings Bexhill bypass' which would have provided a dual-carriageway from the Pevensey roundabout passing to the north of Bexhill and Hastings to join the current A259 near Icklesham at a cost of £120-£130 million were rejected in 2001. The scheme, which was supported by the South East England Regional Assembly and by the Deputy Prime Minister, John Prescott was opposed by English Nature who highlighted the damage to a number of Sites of Special Scientific Interest (SSSIs), including the High Weald Area of Outstanding Natural Beauty. They were also concerned about the negative effect the scheme would have on several ancient woodlands and the habitats of the dormouse and great crested newt.

Following the upgrade of the A2070 road in the late 1990s, the section between Brenzett and Folkestone was de-trunked in 2003 (i.e. removed trunk road status) and control reverted to Kent County Council.

Other development proposals for the road were considered in 2004.

In 2021, Eccy de Jonge, a British author, published an account of policing practices in Great Britain and elsewhere. In a chapter on road deaths, the author reveals two pedestrian deaths on the A259 that occurred in 2013, one near Seaford, East Sussex, the other in Hastings.

== Proposed developments ==
=== Bexhill to Hastings link road ===
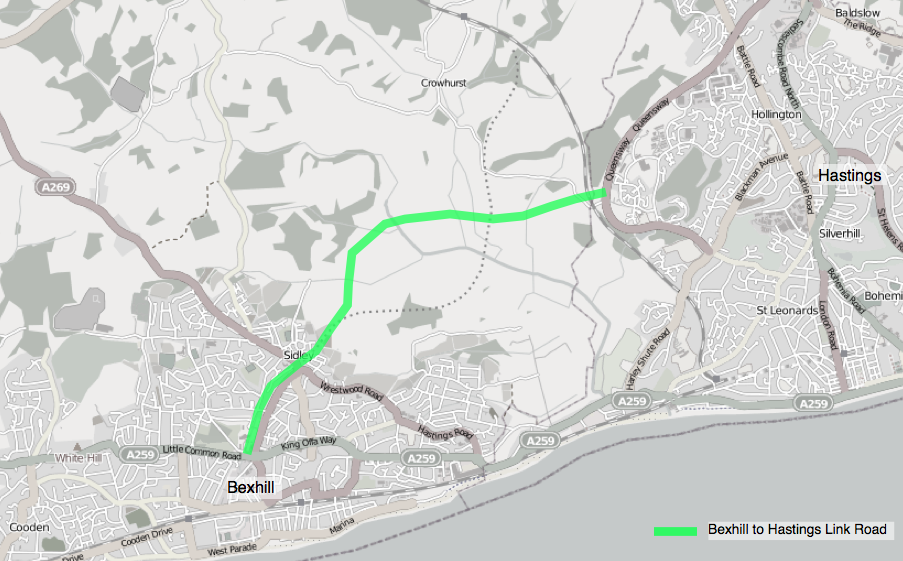
Proposed route of the Bexhill Hastings Link Road

In 2008, East Sussex County Council proposed building a new link road between Bexhill and Hastings, to form a 3.5 miles (5.6 km) long road from its junction with the A259 in Bexhill, to a junction with the B2092 Queensway in Hastings.

The South East Regional Assembly included the scheme within its Regional Funding Advice package. This was provisionally signed off in July 2009 by the Department for Transport, with the caveat that individual schemes would still need to be assessed for value for money and compatibility with greenhouse gas emission targets. Although originally estimated at £45 million, the scheme was now expected to cost over £100 million. £33 million was expected to come from developer contributions, but the County Council was unable to obtain them. "Although opportunities will be explored to seek developer contributions in the future, at the present it has been considered prudent to plan to fund all future local contributions from the County Council's capital programme".

The county council said: "The driving force of the scheme is to enable essential economic regeneration for Bexhill and Hastings, which is currently compromised by the poor accessibility within and between the two towns... the Bexhill Hastings Link Road would make a major contribution to meeting the need to improve access between the towns and linking Trunk Roads which serve the area". They also identified that the scheme would provide "faster and more reliable access to the Conquest Hospital", "easier access to jobs", "create access to much-needed additional housing"; and that it would "re-route traffic from less suitable roads" and "reduce the number of accidents on local roads".

A number of organisations objected to the scheme. The Hastings Alliance, which is supported by 11 national bodies, including the Campaign for the Protection of Rural England, the Council for National Parks, and WWF-UK, and also 16 local groups pointed to the Hastings Five Point Plan, commissioned by the South East Regional Assembly, which found that the key requirement for regeneration is to "improve the strategic accessibility of Hastings – that is Hastings' access to London, other major towns, and other parts of the South East" and says that improving rail links are fundamental to regenerating that area. In addition they objected to the impact on the Combe Haven valley, a Site of Special Scientific Interest, which would be cut in two by the scheme. The Campaign for Better Transport say that, contrary to government guidance, the county council had "never really considered whether building a link road is the best way to improve transport on the Sussex coast". The Woodland Trust also objected, as the road would seriously impact on the Marline Valley Woods Site of Special Scientific Interest, an ancient ghyll woodland. This sort of woodland is only found on steep sided valleys and are hugely important for wildlife but are highly sensitive to pollution. The road would also pass within metres of Church wood (ancient woodland), and other nationally and locally protected wildlife sites. Friends of the Earth were concerned that building roads generates more traffic in the surrounding area, and would result in more vehicles using the roads to the north creating pressure in for communities on the approach roads (such as the A21 and the A28). They also believed it would create pressure to build a 'Hastings Eastern Bypass' which would pass through the High Weald Area of Outstanding Natural Beauty, which they claim is one of Britain's finest landscapes. The Sussex Wildlife Trust "strongly" objected to the road stating that "the environmental damage that will result from this scheme is unacceptable and will alter the ecology of the Combe Haven valley for ever."

A public inquiry into the scheme started on 10 November 2009.

When the Bexhill to Hastings Link Road was eventually approved, then changes also required to the A21 Baldslow / Queensway (which leads to the link road).

The entire project was completed in December 2015 at a cost of around £120 million. The link road was later named Combe Valley Way(A2690). East Sussex Highways confirmed on 29 September 2025 that the new Queensway Gateway Road linking Combe Valley Way/A2690 via the Queensway, St Leonard's on sea, with the A21 at Sedlescombe Road North, St Leonard's on sea, would open on 30 September 2025.

=== '£5m improvements near Shoreham' ===
In 2009, Brighton and Hove City Council, Adur District Council and West Sussex County Council, and the Shoreham Port Authority proposed to spend a £5million grant from the Department for Transport to 'improve the A259 in relation to a new project to build 10,000 homes scheme.
