= A2070 road =

A-Road in Kent, England

A2070

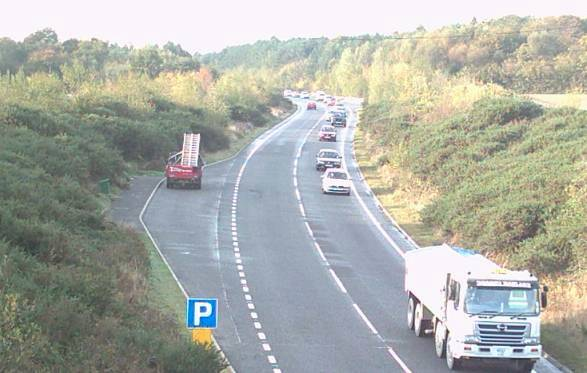
- The A2070 north of Hamstreet

Route information
- Length: 13 mi (21 km)

Major junctions
- North end: Kennington, Kent
- A259 A2042 A292; A20 M20 A292; A28
- South end: Brenzett, Kent

Location
- Country: United Kingdom

Road network
- Roads in the United Kingdom; Motorways; A and B road zones

The A2070 is a major road running north–south through Kent from Ashford to Brenzett. It provides a strategic link between the M20 motorway and the A259, which runs along the East Sussex coast.

== Creation ==
The route was created from the B2081 (Brenzett to Snave) and the north part of the B2070 (Snave to Ashford). The route originally passed through Brenzett, Snave, Hamstreet and Kingsnorth.

== Upgrade ==
In the 1990s, the road was upgraded to a primary route with bypasses around these villages and extended east from Kingsnorth across the East Stour river to connect to the M20 Junction 10. The route continues north of the M20 and terminates at a roundabout on the A28 in Kennington. In 2003 the road became part of the South Coast trunk road, a status previously held by the A259 from Brenzett to Folkestone.

M20 Junction 10A (Sevington Interchange) opened in late 2019 and includes a spur of the A2070.

The road has strategic importance to enable the growth of Ashford as a regional centre. The B2067 links with the A2070 at Hamstreet.
