= William Tress =

English architect (1800–1859)

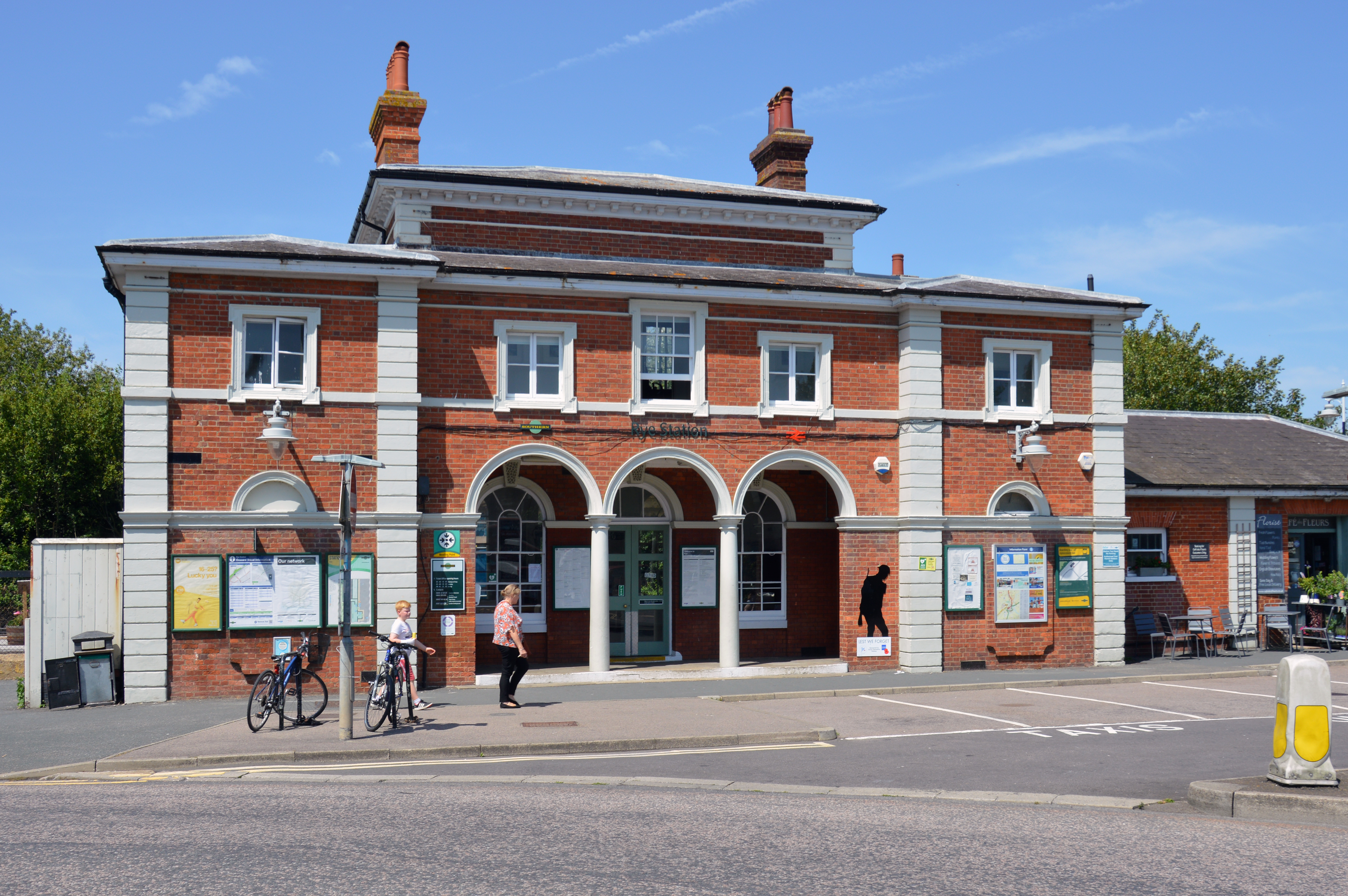
Rye railway station 1850–51

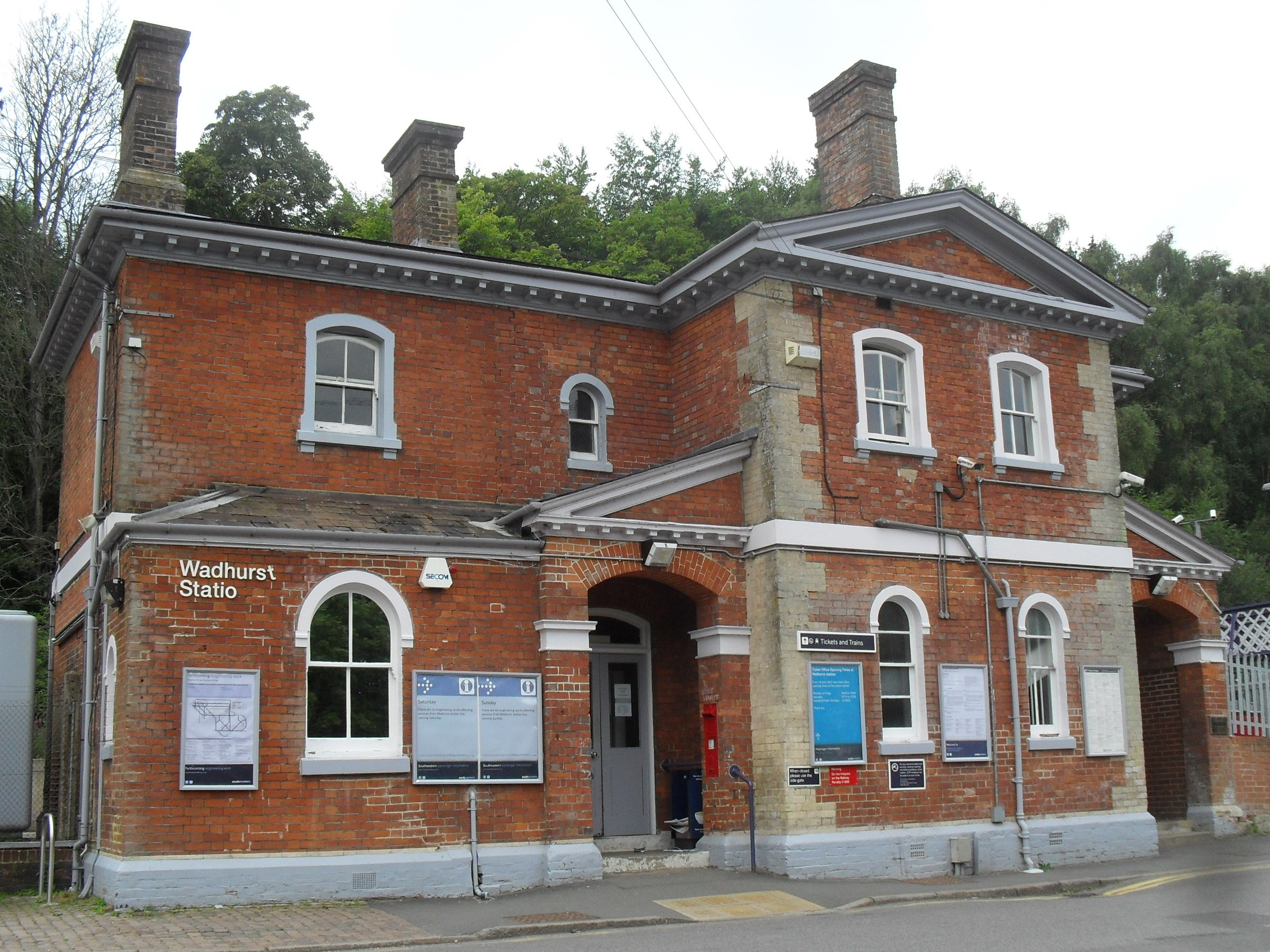
Wadhurst railway station 1851

William Tress (10 May 1800 – 7 March 1859) was an English architect best known for his buildings for the South Eastern Railway.

== Life ==
He was born on 10 May 1800 in Faversham, Kent, the son of Thomas Tress (1779–1825) and Esther Finch (1781–1854).

He married Ann Fearn (b. ca. 1803) on 7 February 1832 in Langham and they had the following children:

- Ellen Anne Ruck Tress (1836–1919)
- Marian (or Mary Anne) Tress (born 1839)
- Esther Tress (born 1841)

He married secondly Emma Wood (born 1830), youngest daughter of Lieutenant William Wood, R.N. of Brambling House, Kent on 19 November 1853. at St Paul's, Bunhill Row, Finsbury Park. They had one son.

- William Tress (born 1854)

He died on 7 March 1859 at Redhill Lodge, Redhill after a short illness.

== Career ==
He was articled to Sir William Tite. He worked for the Reading, Guildford & Reigate railway and then was appointed surveyor and architect to the South Eastern Railway where he designed many stations.

== List of works ==
- All Saints’ Church, Caledonian Road, Kings Cross, London 1837–38 (demolished post 1945)
- Schools, Kingsland Road, Shoreditch 1843
- Refuge for the Destitute, Dalston, London 1850–51 (chapel, dining room and dormitories)
- Winchelsea railway station 1850–51
- Rye railway station 1850–51
- Appledore railway station 1850–51 and Goods Shed
- Ham Street railway station 1850–51
- Wadhurst railway station 1851
- Frant railway station 1851
- Stonegate railway station 1851 (originally Witherenden station)
- Etchingham railway station 1851
- Robertsbridge railway station 1851
- Battle railway station 1851
- Crowhurst railway station 1851
- Hastings railway station 1851 (replaced by new building by J.R. Scott 1931)
- Custom House, Folkestone 1853
