= Ore railway station =

Railway station in East Sussex, England

Ore
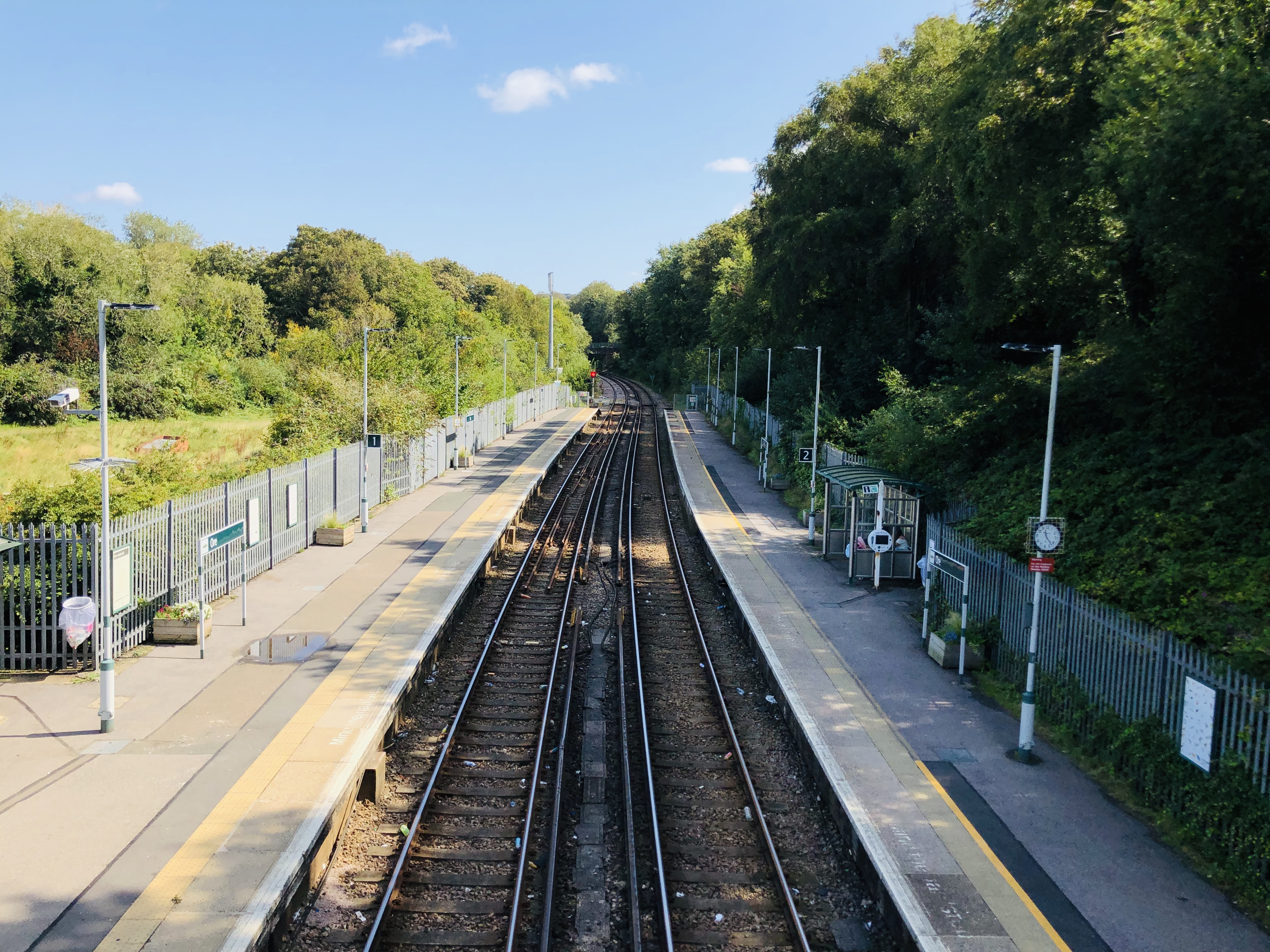
- The platforms at Ore station, looking north-east

General information
- Location: Ore, Borough of Hastings, England
- Coordinates: 50.867°N 0.592°E
- Grid reference: TQ824106
- Manager: Southern
- Platforms: 2

Other information
- Station code: ORE
- Classification: DfT category F2

History
- Opened: 1 January 1888

Passengers
- 2020/21: ▼78,634
- 2021/22: ▲0.208 million
- 2022/23: ▲0.229 million
- 2023/24: ▲0.255 million
- 2024/25: ▲0.272 million
Location
Notes
- Passenger statistics from the Office of Rail and Road

Ore railway station serves the suburb of Ore, in Hastings, East Sussex, England. It lies on the Marshlink Line. Services are provided by Southern, with a single peak hour service operated by Southeastern. Third rail 750 V DC electrification from Hastings ends here.

The station is also the terminus for electric services on the East Coastway Line. Trains terminating and restarting at this station run forward into a turnaround siding, which runs adjacent to the Marshlink Line as far as Ore Tunnel. Ore is also the start of a single-track section.

== History ==
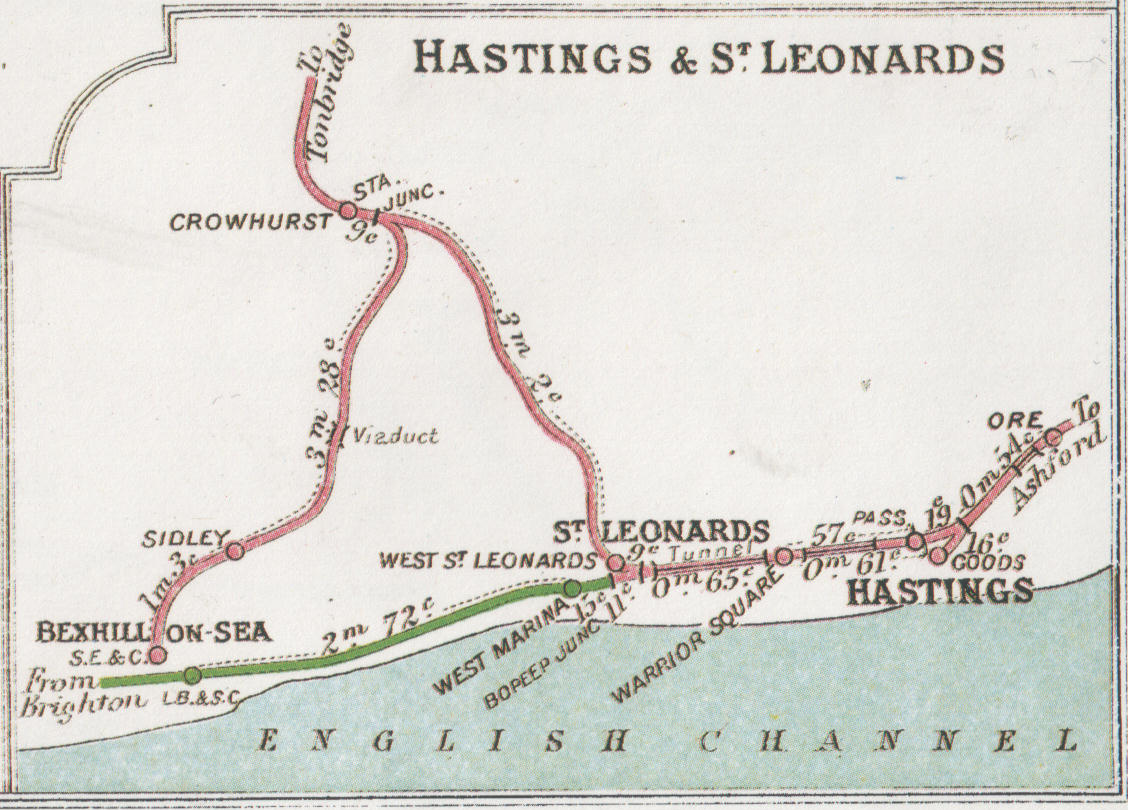
A 1914 Railway Clearing House map of lines around Ore

The station opened in 1888 and was electrified in 1935.

Ore station was once adjoined to the north by a depot for electric trains, but this closed in May 1986 following the electrification of the Hastings to Tonbridge line. Train servicing and cleaning was relocated to St Leonards Depot.

== Facilities ==
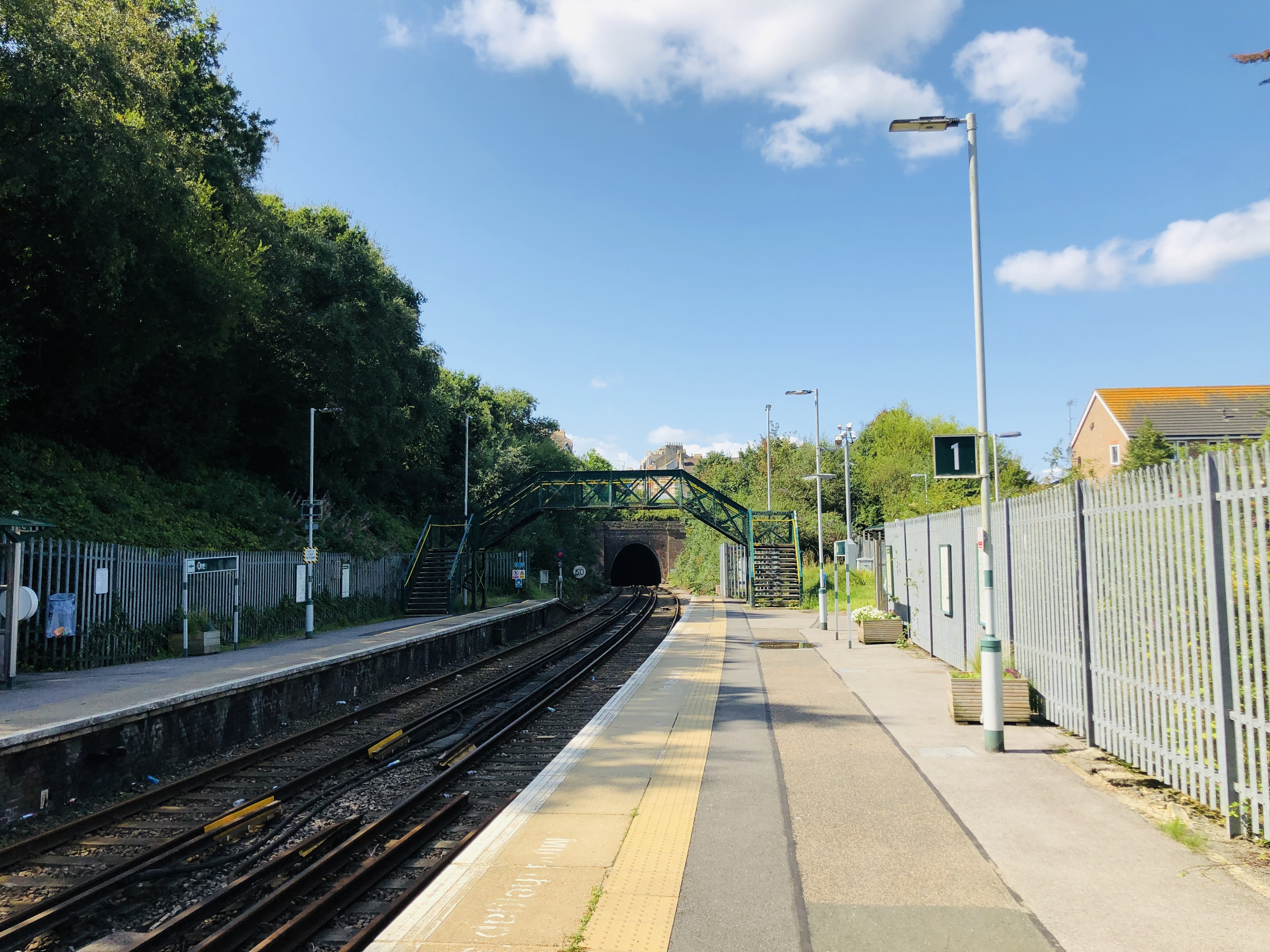
The platforms, looking south-west towards Hastings

There are two platforms, linked by a footbridge; both have shelters and modern help points. Ore station has been unstaffed since a booking office fire in the late 1980s, although the station has a self-service ticket machine available for purchases. The station has step-free access to the Ashford-bound platform only.

The area has in the past been a hotspot for vandalism but is now covered comprehensively by CCTV. It is scheduled for redevelopment in the future, which may involve the station being renamed to either Hastings East or Ore Valley.

== Services ==
Services at Ore are operated by two train operating companies; the typical service in trains per hour/day (tph/tpd) is:

Southern:

- 1 tph to London Victoria, via Gatwick Airport
- 1 tph to Brighton (semi-fast)
- 1 tph to Eastbourne (stopping)
- 1 tph to Ashford International.

Southeastern:

- 1 tpd to London Charing Cross, via Tunbridge Wells.

Preceding station	National Rail	Following station
Hastings	Southern Marshlink Line	Three Oaks
Hastings	Southern East Coastway Line	Terminus
Hastings	Southeastern Hastings Line Limited Service	Terminus
