= Ham Street railway station =

Railway station in Kent, England

Coordinates: 51.068°N 0.855°E

Ham Street
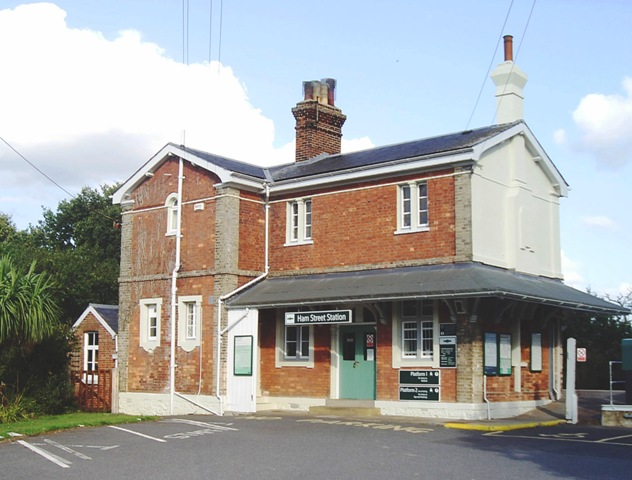

General information
- Location: Hamstreet, Ashford; England
- Grid reference: TR000337
- Manager: Southern
- Platforms: 2

Other information
- Station code: HMT
- Classification: DfT category E

History
- Opened: 13 February 1851

Passengers
- 2020/21: ▼31,340
- 2021/22: ▲57,486
- 2022/23: ▲59,092
- 2023/24: ▲77,776
- 2024/25: ▲81,830

Listed Building – Grade II
- Feature: Railway station
- Designated: 9 May 2005
- Reference no.: 1391381
Location
Notes
- Passenger statistics from the Office of Rail and Road

Ham Street railway station is a Grade II listed stop on the Marshlink line in the village of Hamstreet, Kent, between Ashford International and Hastings. Services are provided by Southern.

== Location ==
The station is on a dual-track section of the unelectrified Marshlink Line. Train services are provided by Southern and operated by Class 171 Turbostar diesel trains.

The booking office - open on Mondays to Saturdays mornings - is located in the main station building on the Ashford-bound platform. The two PERTIS passenger-operated self-service ticket machines - one on each platform - have now been removed and replaced with Ticket Vending machines on each platform, which allows a ticket to be purchased from any origin, as opposed to just from Ham Street. The PERTIS passenger-operated self-service machines were installed in connection with a Penalty Fares Scheme in 2008.

== History ==
The station was built by the South Eastern Railway to the designs of the company architect William Tress as one of four original stops on the line from Ashford to Hastings (the others being Appledore, Rye and Winchelsea). It opened on 13 February 1851. A goods station was added later in the year.

The original name was Ham Street. It was renamed to Ham Street & Orlestone on 1 February 1897, and then reverted to Ham Street in 1976. It was Grade II listed in 2005.

Along with several other stations on the line, Ham Street opened with staggered platforms, allowing a crossing across the railway from one to the other. After several accidents and near misses, a temporary footbridge was provided in 2014, replacing the previous flat crossing of the railway. It was replaced by a permanent bridge in 2017.

== Services ==
All services at Ham Street are operated by Southern using Class 171 DMUs.

The typical off-peak service in trains per hour is:

- 1 tph to Eastbourne via Hastings
- 1 tph to Ashford International

Previously, westbound trains ran as an express service to Brighton, although this was changed to a stopping service to Eastbourne in the May 2018 timetable change.

Preceding station	National Rail	Following station
Appledore	Southern Marshlink Line	Ashford International
