= Rye railway station (East Sussex) =

Railway station in East Sussex, England

Coordinates: 50.952340°N 0.730690°E

Rye
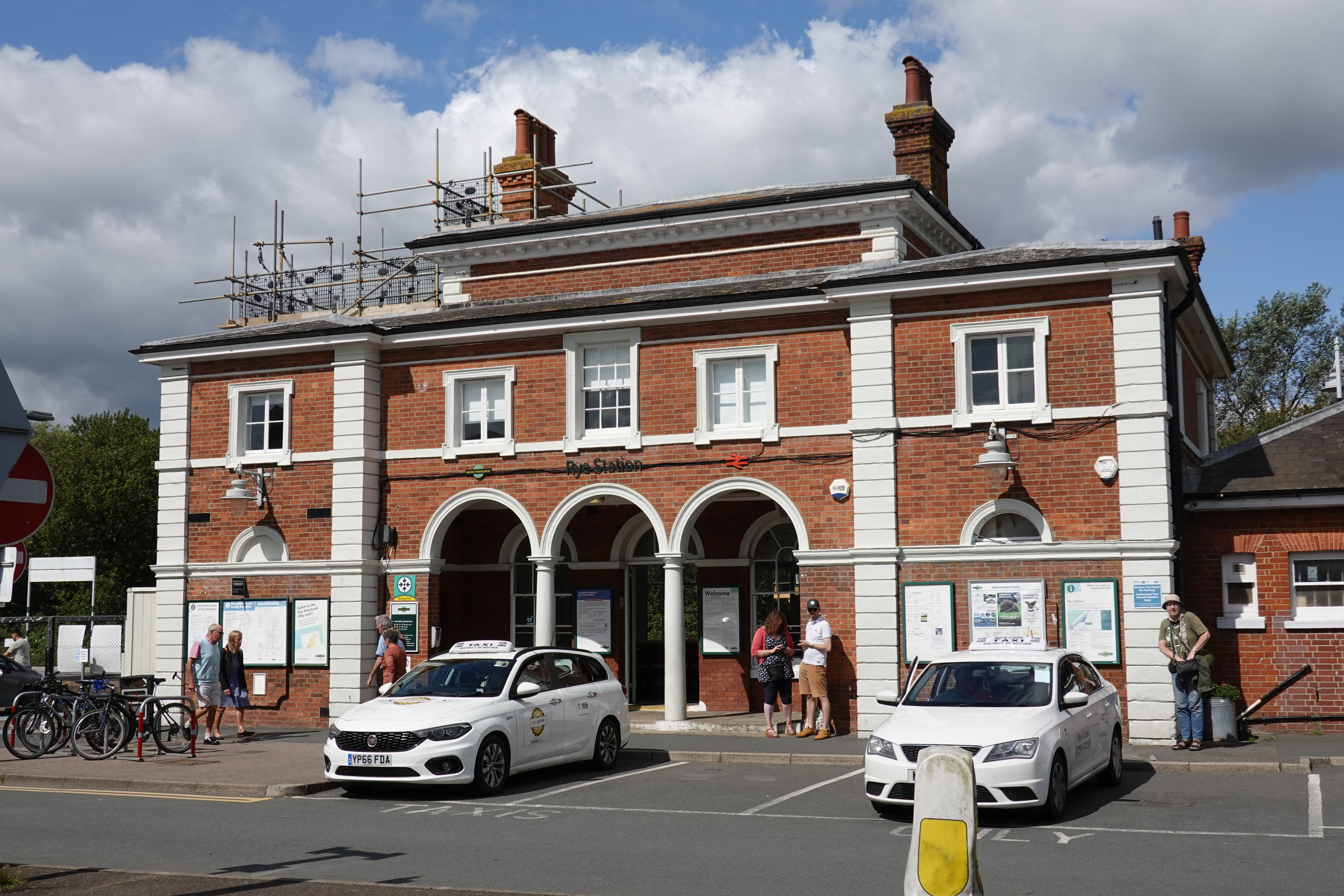
- Front view of the main building

General information
- Location: Rye, Rother; England
- Grid reference: TQ918205
- Manager: Southern
- Platforms: 2

Other information
- Station code: RYE
- Classification: DfT category E

History
- Opened: 13 February 1851

Passengers
- 2020/21: ▼0.153 million
- 2021/22: ▲0.399 million
- 2022/23: ▲0.431 million
- 2023/24: ▲0.459 million
- 2024/25: ▲0.480 million

Listed Building – Grade II
- Feature: Railway station
- Designated: 11 April 1980
- Reference no.: 1252164
Location
Notes
- Passenger statistics from the Office of Rail and Road

Rye railway station is a Grade II listed station, serving Rye, East Sussex, England. It is on the Marshlink line between Hastings and Ashford International and is the principal station between those two terminals. The station is a passing place between two single-track sections. Services are provided by Southern, usually between Eastbourne and Ashford.

A station at Rye was first planned in the early 1840s, though on a different route to what was opened. It was built by the South Eastern Railway as the central station on the line from Hastings to Ashford, opening in 1851. Despite recommendation for closure in the 1963 Beeching Report, it has remained open because of poor quality road connections. The station building was designed by William Tress; it was Grade II listed in 1980, while an 1894 signal box was listed in 2013.

== Location ==
The station is on Cinque Ports Street to the north of the town centre, between two level crossings to the west and east. There are two platforms, one for trains to Ashford and the other for Hastings. The line is double track through the station providing a passing loop for trains on the Marshlink line, which is single-track between Ore and Appledore. The staggered platforms are linked by a footbridge. There is a waiting room on Platform 2 (Hastings bound).

Stagecoach South East bus routes 70, 100, 101, 102, 292, 293, 312, 313, 326, 342 and 553 serve the station.

== History ==
=== Background ===
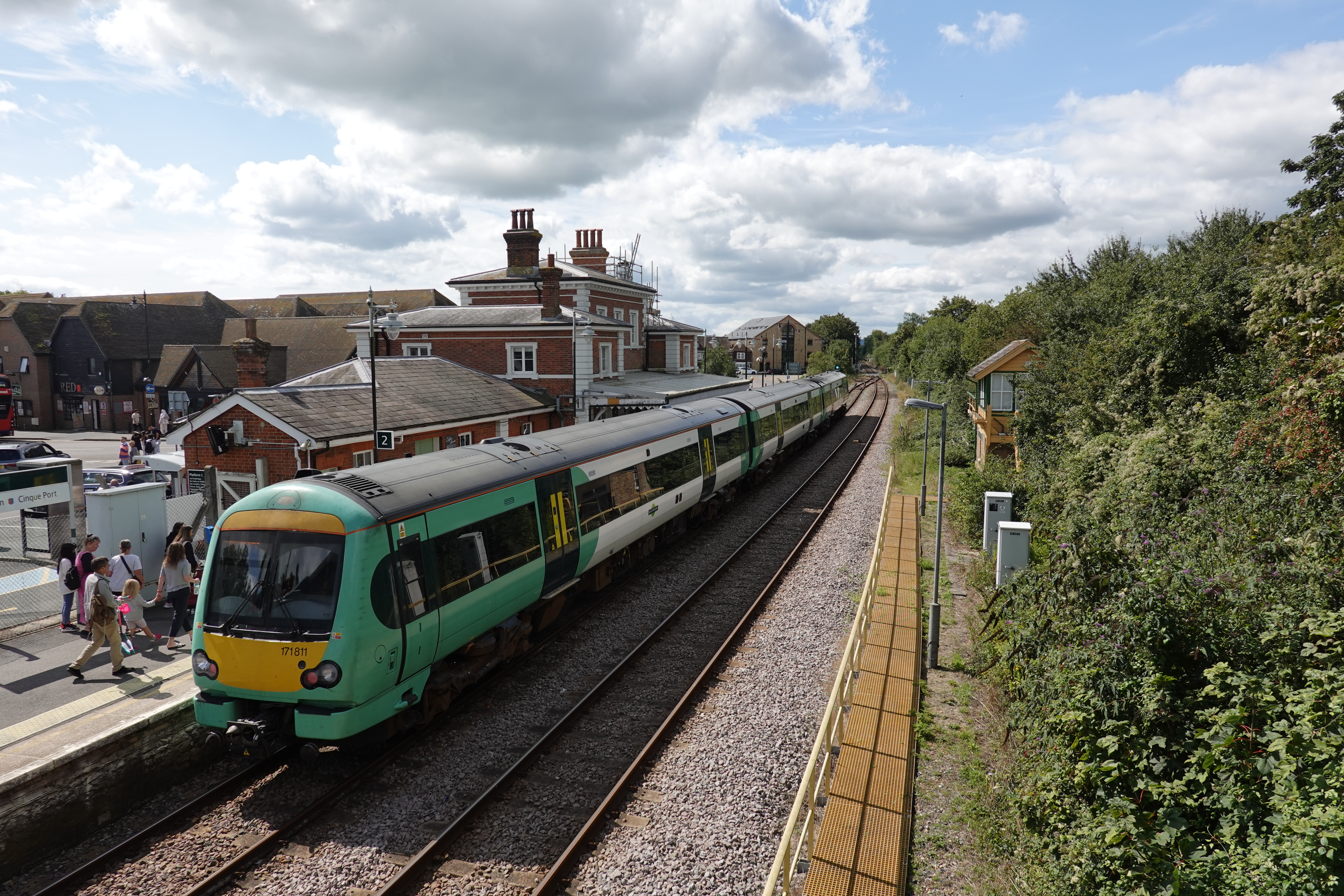
A Southern Class 171 train at Platform 2

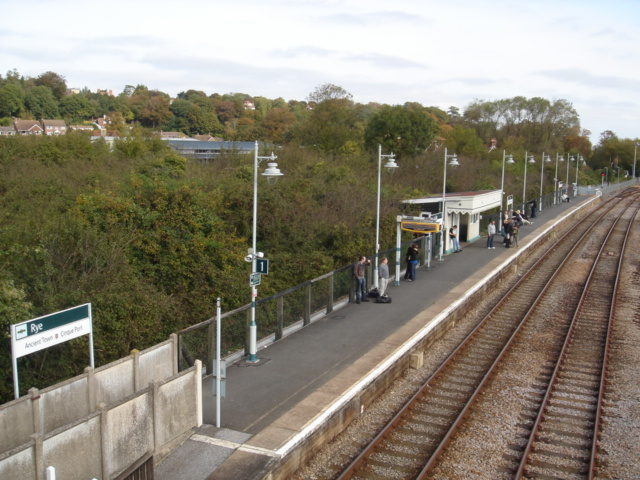
View of Platform 1 (Ashford-bound) from the footbridge

A station at Rye was proposed in April 1840, when the Tenterden, Rye & Hastings Branch Railway planned a line from the South Eastern Main Line near Smarden to Hastings via Tenterden and Rye. At the time, harbour duties were not charged at Rye, making it a suitable port for goods traffic. The following year, it was estimated that a single-track line from the South Eastern Main Line to Hastings via Rye could be built for £250,000 (£22,424,000 in 2025). The company attempted to negotiate construction with the South Eastern Railway (SER), who thought the route was a poor choice and preferred to reach Hastings from Tunbridge Wells via Penshurst.

In 1844, the SER became concerned that the Brighton, Lewes & Hastings Railway (BLHR) would extend its line beyond Hastings to Rye and Ashford. A compromise was reached whereby the BLHR was granted permission to build the line with an option for the SER to take over if necessary. The River Rother to the east of Rye was still navigable and required a moveable crossing. Peter W. Barlow designed a swing-bridge to carry the line over the river. Both this bridge and the one over the River Tillingham to the west required approach ramps on an otherwise flat stretch of railway.

The SER's contract stipulated that the company should contribute £10,000 (£897,000 as of 2025) towards improving Rye Harbour, and Robert Stephenson recommended a branch line for goods traffic. This was constructed west of the station and the River Tillingham, running to the harbour pier on the opposite side of the river to the town. The branch line never carried passengers and has been demolished.

=== Opening ===
The first train to Rye ran on 28 October 1850, before the line had been fully completed. The Mayor of London travelled from London Bridge to Rye via Ashford and gave a short speech at the station. It opened on 13 February 1851, along with stations at Ham Street, Appledore and Winchelsea. A coal stage opened in 1854, and new goods sidings were added in 1874.

In 1859, a proposal was made to link Rye with Folkestone via Lydd and Dymchurch. The SER declined to finance the line. In 1864, the Weald of Kent Railway proposed building a line from Paddock Wood to Appledore (and hence to Rye) via Tenterden. The scheme was cancelled two years later.

=== Post-opening ===
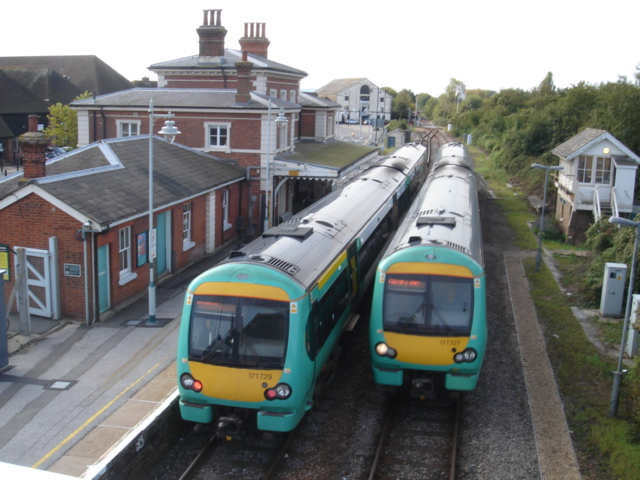
Marshlink trains are scheduled to pass at Rye

The swing bridge to the east of the station over the River Rother was replaced by a fixed bridge in 1903. A footbridge was installed across the staggered platforms at the station in 1960, in preparation for the Kent electrification scheme Phase 2 of the British Railways Modernisation Plan, which provisionally included the line through Rye.

The line was recommended to be closed in the 1963 Beeching Report, but because of poor road connections, it remained open along with its stations. The prolonged threat of closure left the station unmodernised and gaslit well into the 1970s. On 1 October 1979, the Marshlink line either side of Rye was reduced to a single track, leaving a passing loop at the station. Though done for economic reasons, it created bottlenecks, and invited criticism.

The station was Grade II listed in April 1980 owing to its "special architectural or historic interest". The goods shed, which was closed in 1963, was demolished in 1984.

In November 2023, the station was closed for safety reasons while a bonfire event in the town took place.

== Buildings ==
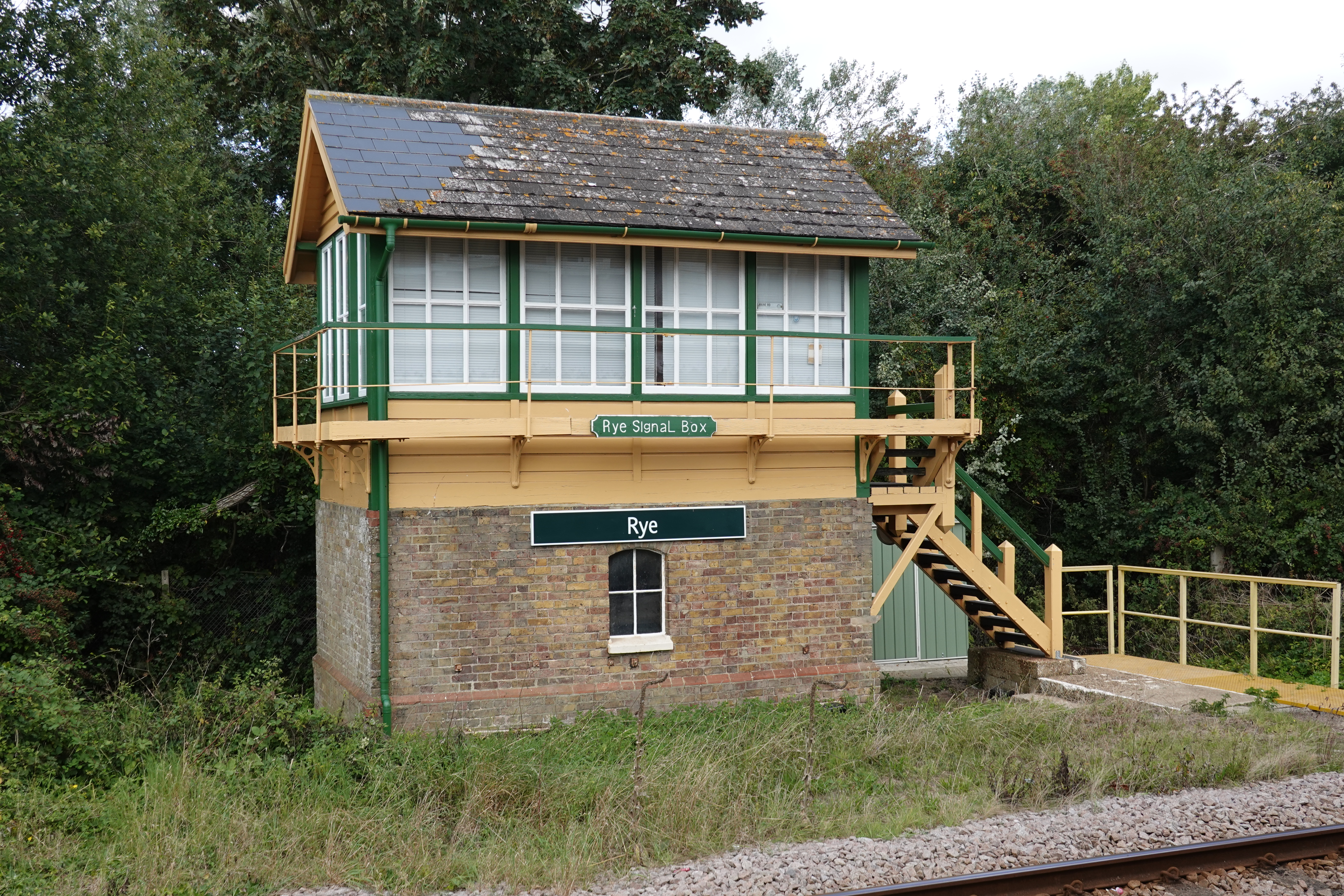
The station's signal box, opposite Platform 2

Construction of the station building began in 1847. It was designed by William Tress in symmetric Italianate style of two storeys with an attic in red brick with a slate roof and set of gateless gate pillars. As Rye was planned to be a more significant stop than Appledore or Winchelsea, it was designed to be bigger than those. Tress also designed a goods shed in a similar style, sited alongside the main station building.

Several SER stations were retrofitted with signals on the line in the early 1890s. The box at Rye was built in 1894 using a Saxby & Farmer Type 12 design. It retains its original 1888 pattern Duplex frame, though the original 30-lever manual signals were replaced by coloured lights on 1 October 1979. The ground floor is constructed of Flemish bond brown brick, the first floor is made of timber with weatherboard cladding, and the building is covered by a slate roof. The signal box was Grade II listed in 2013 as it is one of only two of its type still standing in good condition. In 2019, it was repainted and refurbished.

== Services ==
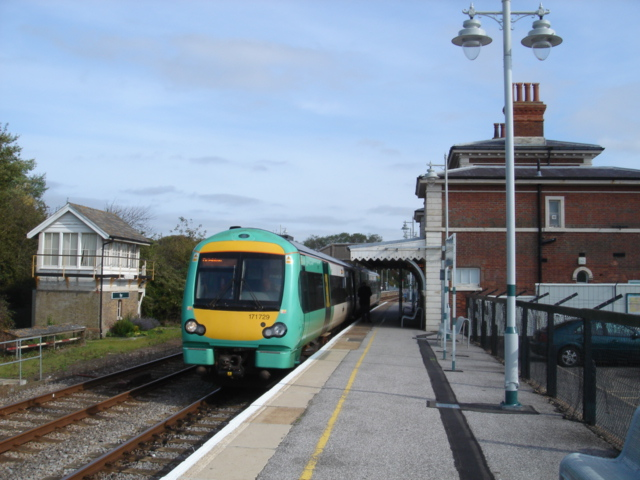
Class 171 Turbostar Diesel Multiple Unit number 171729 on a Brighton service

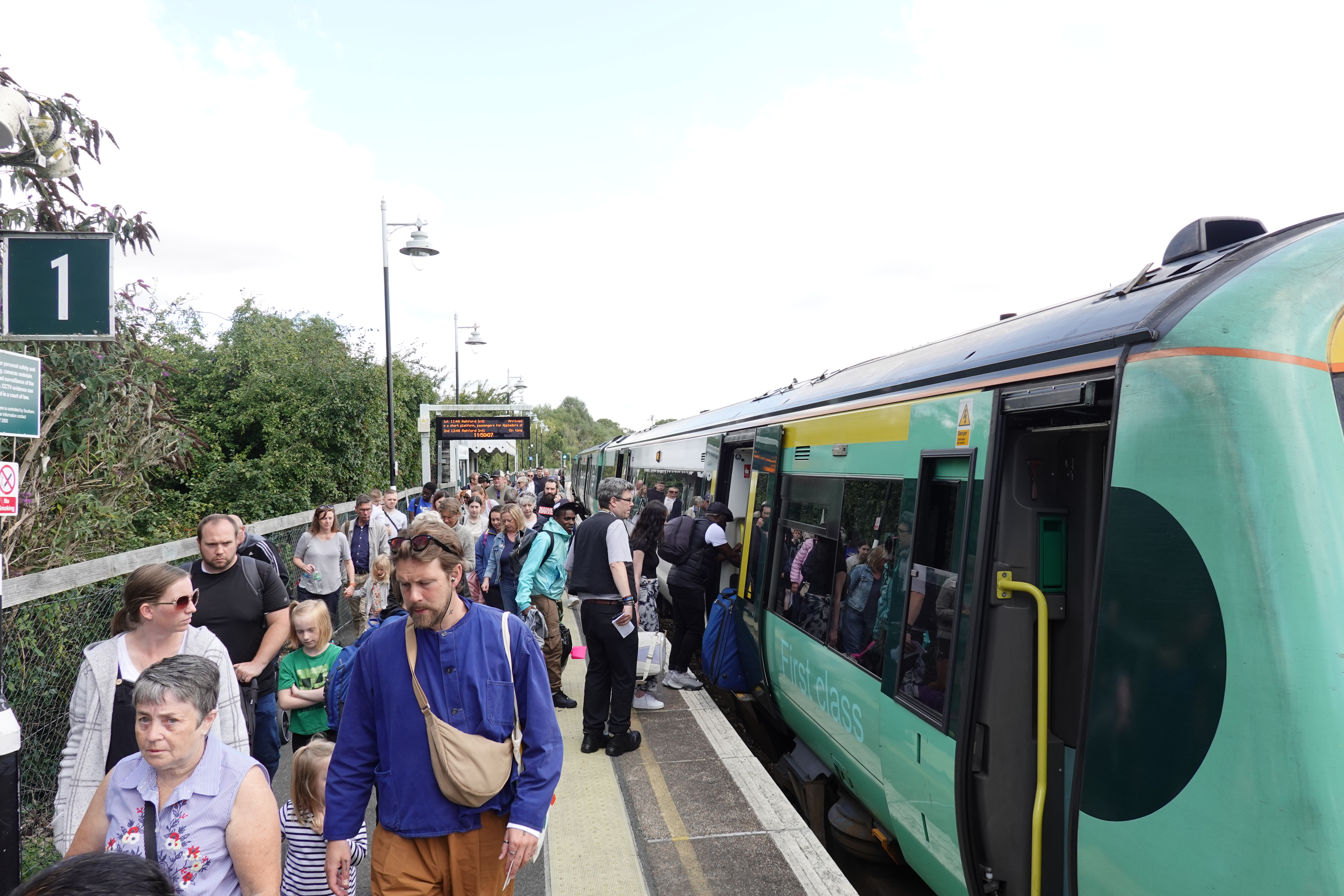
A Southern Class 171 service on Platform 1, bound for Ashford International

All services at Rye are operated by Southern using Class 171 diesel multiple units.

The typical off-peak service in trains per hour is:

- 1 tph to Eastbourne via Hastings
- 1 tph to Ashford International

Late at night, services only run to Ashford and Hastings.

Previously, westbound trains ran as an express service to Brighton although this was changed to a stopping service to Eastbourne in the May 2018 timetable change.

Until 2020, shuttle trains ran between Rye and Ashford during peak hours. These were withdrawn as part of the COVID-19 pandemic restrictions, but briefly reappeared in June 2023. As of late 2023, there are no peak shuttle services.

There have been several proposals to integrate the Marshlink line with High Speed 1 at Ashford, which would allow a direct connection between Rye and St Pancras, with estimated times of less than an hour (down from 85 minutes). In 2018, Network Rail announced a fast service from St Pancras to Hastings would stop at Rye, and could be implemented by 2024. However, the date remains uncertain despite support from Amber Rudd, a former Member of Parliament for Hastings and Rye.

Preceding station	National Rail	Following station
Winchelsea	Southern Marshlink Line	Appledore
