= River Rye =

The River Rye may refer to:

- River Rye (Ireland), a tributary of the River Liffey
- River Rye, Yorkshire, a river in the English county of North Yorkshire
