= Rye and Camber Tramway =

Former narrow gauge railway line in England

Coordinates: 50.938°N 0.770°E

Overview
- Headquarters: Rye
- Locale: England
- Dates of operation: 1895–1939
- Successor: abandoned

Technical
- Track gauge: 3 ft (914 mm)
- Length: 1 3/4 miles (2.8 km)

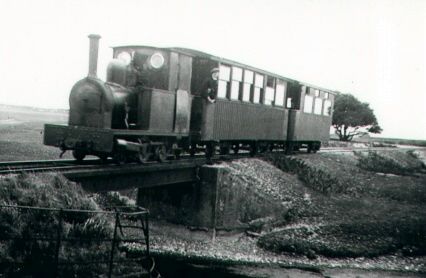
Rye and Camber Tramway - 'Victoria' with train crosses Broadwater Bridge (1914)

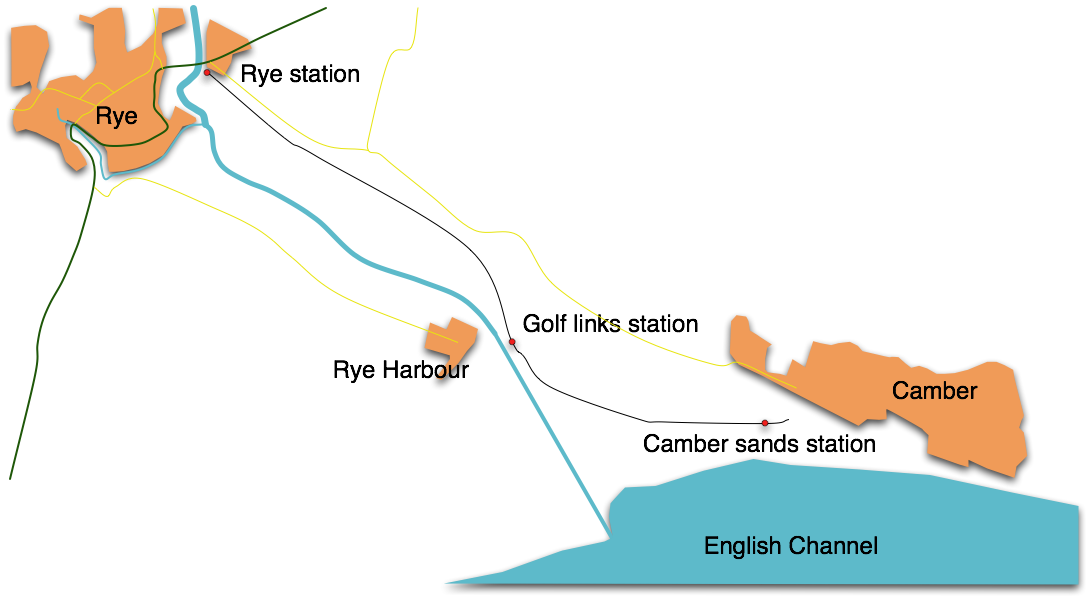
Map of the Rye and Camber Tramway

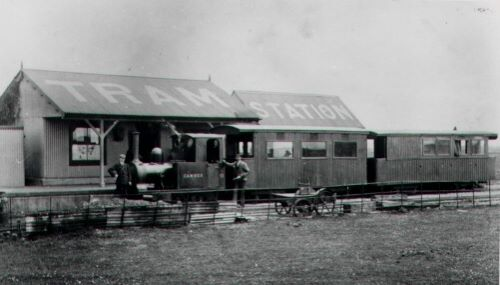
Rye and Camber Tramway - Rye Station

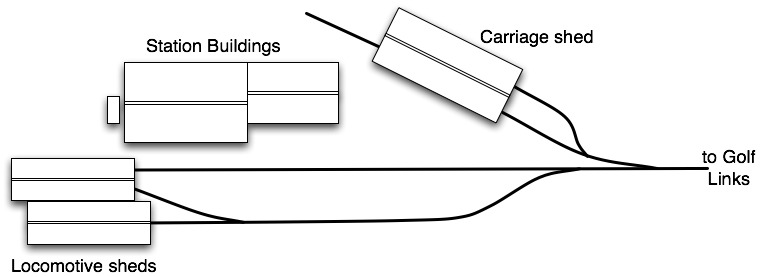
Rye Station

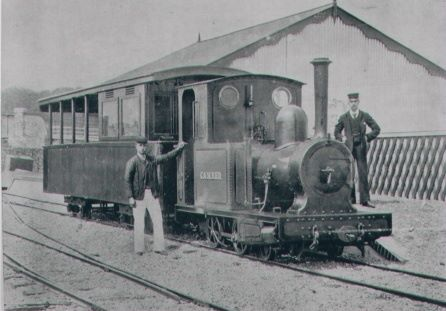
Rye and Camber Tramway - 'Camber' at Rye with the Bagnall coach (1895)

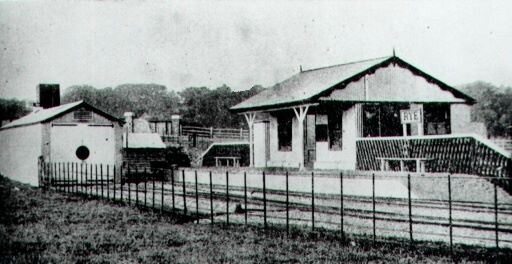
Rye and Camber Tramway - Original Rye Station (1895)

The Rye and Camber Tramway was an English railway in East Sussex. It was of 3 ft (914 mm) narrow gauge, relatively unusual amongst British narrow gauge railways. It operated from 1895 until 1939, connecting Rye to the coast. It was about 1 3/4 miles (2.8 km) in length, and had three stations – Rye, Golf Links and Camber Sands. It operated mainly to transport golfers to the golf links and holidaymakers to the coastal dunes.

== History ==
The railway was constructed between January and July 1895 and ran entirely on private land. It was the first designed by consulting engineer Holman F. Stephens, who went on to build and run small railways all over the Country.

The line was built to convey golfers to the Rye Golf Club and ran from Rye (R&CT) station to the golf club. In 1908 the first extension to Camber Sands station was opened and the intermediate station renamed "Golf Links". Camber Sands terminal was moved to a more accessible site and a tea hut was opened at the end of summer 1938, but this only used for a few months as the war intervened the next year.

Although initially quite successful, increasing competition from automobile and bus transport eventually caused the tramway to enter a gradual economic decline, as was the case with many small railways. Passenger service was ended at the outbreak of World War II but it was extensively used by the Government to convey parts for the P.L.U.T.O. (Pipe Line Under The Ocean) project for which a special siding leading to a new pier near Golf Links Station was constructed by Canadian troops.

The line was in such a run-down a condition by the end of the war that it was deemed irrecoverable and was sold for scrap in 1947. The Rye & Camber Tramways Co. Ltd was liquidated in February 1949.

== Remains ==
A number of relics, including the frame and bogies of one of the carriages, can be seen at the Colonel Stephens Museum at Tenterden.

Golf Links station building survives virtually intact. Some track is embedded in concrete near the station as the trackbed was used as a roadway during wartime. Most of the route is a footpath, although a short section has been destroyed by gravel workings.

The line plays a prominent part in several novels by Rye resident E. F. Benson.

The Ticket Office building at Amerton Railway is inspired by the designs of the buildings from the Rye and Camber Tramway.

== Rolling stock ==
=== Locomotives ===
There were two small Bagnall steam locomotives, "Camber" and "Victoria", but in later years a small petrol locomotive was used exclusively.

Name	Builder	Type	Date	Works number	Cylinders	Total wheelbase	Boiler pressure	Notes
Camber	W. G. Bagnall	2-4-0T	1895	1461	5in x 9in	5 ft 6in	140 lb/sq in	Scrapped at Rye in 1947
Victoria	W. G. Bagnall	2-4-0T	1897	1511	6in x 10in	6 ft 5 1/2in	140 lb/sq in	Sold in 1937
	Kent Construction Company	4wPM	1924	1364	n/a		n/a	Based on the Motor Rail "Simplex" design. Sold October 1946

=== Carriages ===
The tramway had two enclosed carriages, one built by Bagnall and the other by The Rother Iron Works, Rye. Two four-wheel wagons were also fitted with seats for passengers and several locally-built four-wheel wagons were used to convey sand from the beach for local builders. Several temporary sidings were constructed at the Camber end for this purpose, where the dug-out dunes can still be seen.

== See also ==
- British narrow gauge railways
