= Lydd Town railway station =

Former railway station in England

Coordinates: 50.9567°N 0.9174°E

Lydd Town
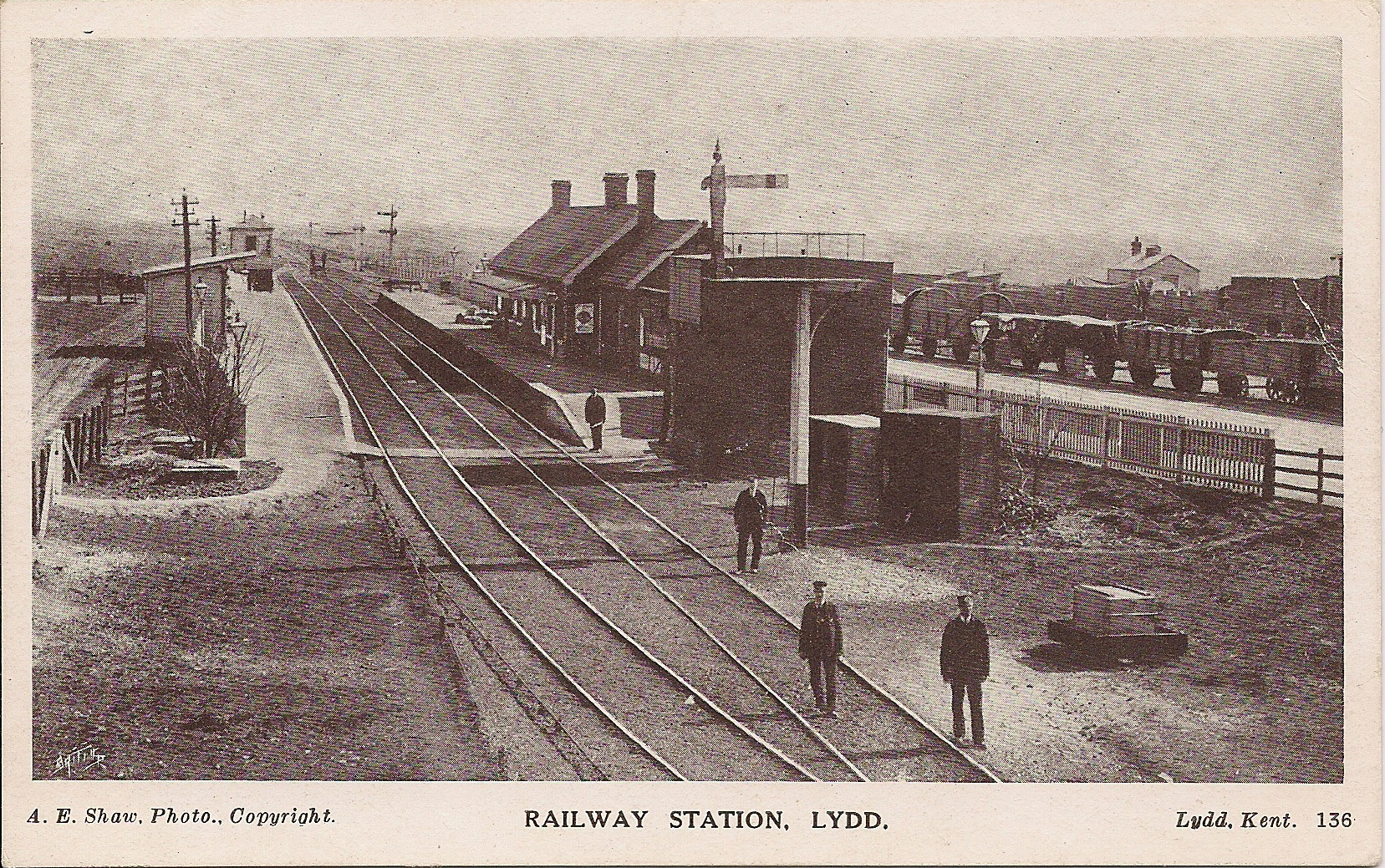
- Lydd Town railway station in the 1900s

General information
- Location: Lydd, Folkestone & Hythe; England
- Grid reference: TR050215
- Platforms: 2

Other information
- Status: Disused

History
- Pre-grouping: Lydd Railway; South Eastern Railway; South Eastern and Chatham Railway
- Post-grouping: Southern Railway; Southern Region of British Railways

Key dates
- 7 December 1881: Opened as Lydd
- 4 July 1937: Renamed Lydd Town
- 6 March 1967: Closed to passenger traffic
- 4 October 1971: Closed to regular goods traffic
Location

Lydd Town was a railway station which served the town of Lydd in Kent, England. Opened on 7 December 1881 by the Lydd Railway Company. It closed to passengers in 1967 but the line through the station remained open for freight.

== History ==
The Lydd Railway Company (LRC) obtained authorisation to construct a standard gauge single track line from Appledore to Dungeness with intermediate stops at Lydd and Brookland. Having opened the line to traffic on 7 December 1881, the railway company subsequently decided on 16 February 1882 that the line would be worked and maintained by the South Eastern Railway, whose chairman, Edward Watkin, was the father of Alfred Watkin, chairman of the LRC. On 24 July, the company was authorised to extend the line by building a branch from Lydd to New Romney which opened on 19 June 1884. The LRC was taken into the South Eastern in January 1895, itself becoming part of the South Eastern and Chatham Railway four years later.

Lydd, situated 7 miles (11 km) from Appledore, was the principal station on the line, with a considerable goods yard and a long siding to the nearby military firing range (Lydd Ranges) via the 6-mile (10 km) Lydd Military Railway (1883 - c1926). The approach to Lydd from Brookland saw the line travel over nine level crossings before passing under the line's sole overbridge carrying the B2075 Station Road, before reaching a final level crossing just before the station. The station had two platforms as well as a passing loop and a signal box on the down side.

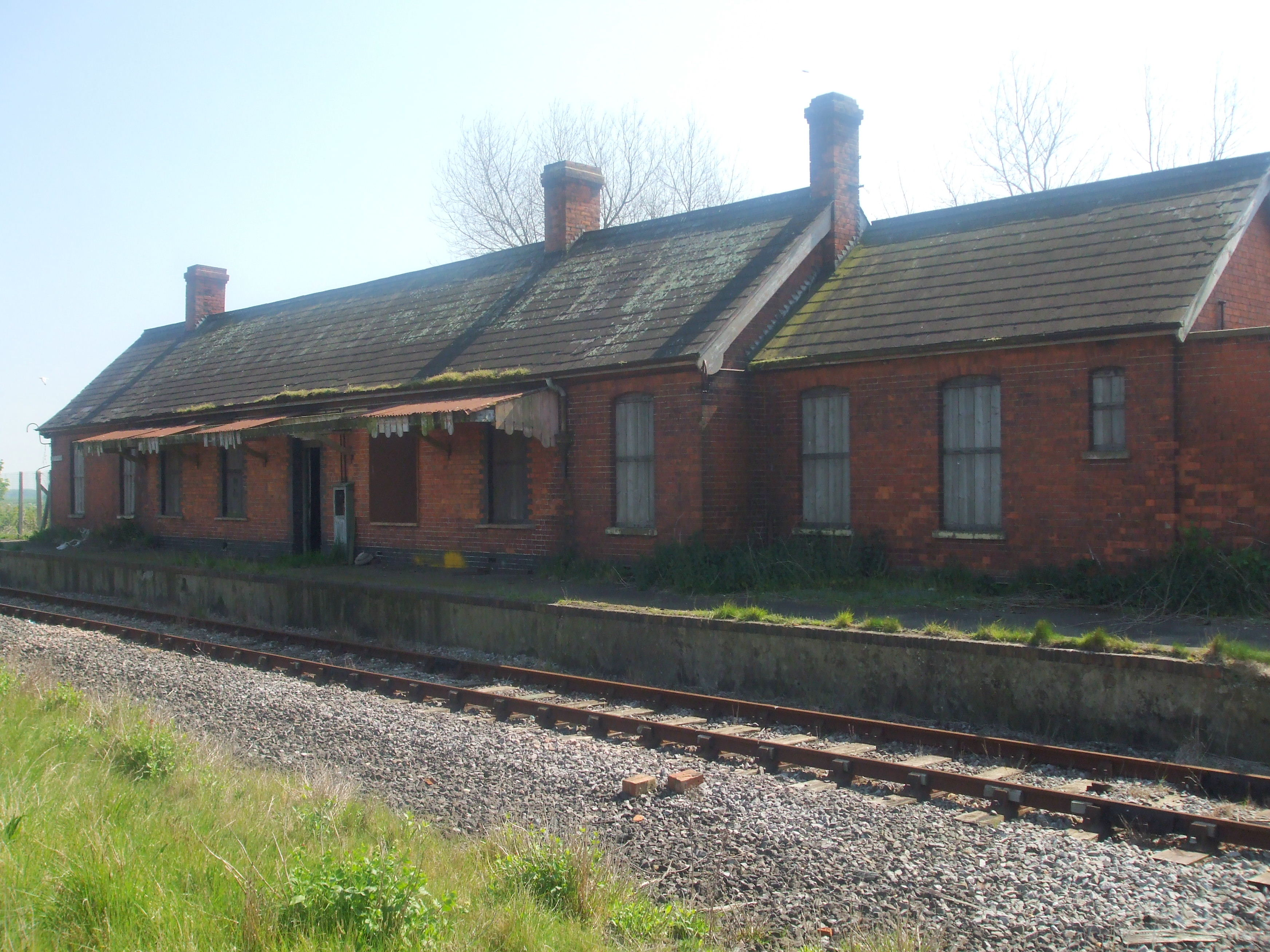
Lydd Town train station in 2008

Following the opening of the Romney, Hythe and Dymchurch Railway in 1927, the extra holiday traffic generated persuaded the Southern Railway (who had taken over the line upon the railway grouping) to realign its branch to New Romney by moving it nearer to the sea and opening two new halts - Lydd-on-Sea and Greatstone-on-Sea - in 1937. The opening of Lydd-on-Sea Halt led to the renaming of Lydd station as "Lydd Town" to avoid any confusion. The station closed on 6 March 1967 in the face of dwindling passenger traffic and insignificant freight returns, although the line remained open through Lydd Town as far as a siding near Dungeness for freight traffic to serve the BNFL nuclear power plant at Dungeness.

Preceding station	Disused railways	Following station
Brookland Halt; Line open, station closed	Southern Railway; New Romney branch	New Romney and Littlestone-on-Sea; Line and station closed
Brookland Halt; Line open, station closed	BR Southern Region; New Romney branch	Lydd-on-Sea Halt; Line and station closed
Brookland Halt; Line open, station closed	Southern Railway; Dungeness branch	Dungeness; Line and station closed

== Present and future ==
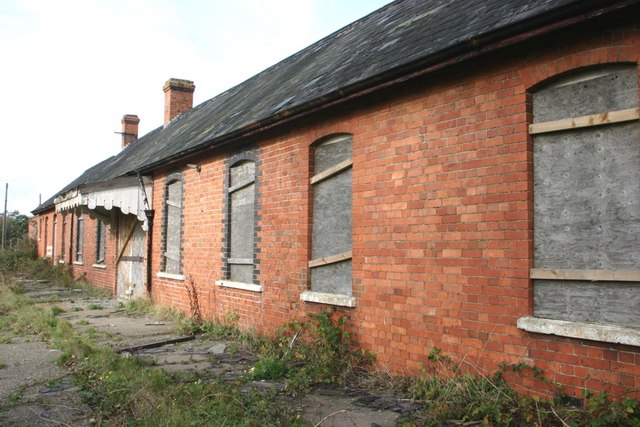
Close-up of the station building

The main station building and goods yard remain in an empty and derelict state, having been used as a vehicle repair workshop until the mid-1980s, which led to some internal walls being removed. The up platform has also survived, but the down platform and signal box were demolished in the early 1970s, and the original passing loop was lifted after 1993. The station has suffered from vandalism, with a recent fire destroying a modern shed on the site and lightly damaging the southern end of the main building. In May 2006, British Rail put the site on the market for redevelopment. In March 2008, planning permission was granted to Kent County Council to use the goods yard for the temporary storage of refuse collection vehicles. In July 2013, a new passing loop was added.

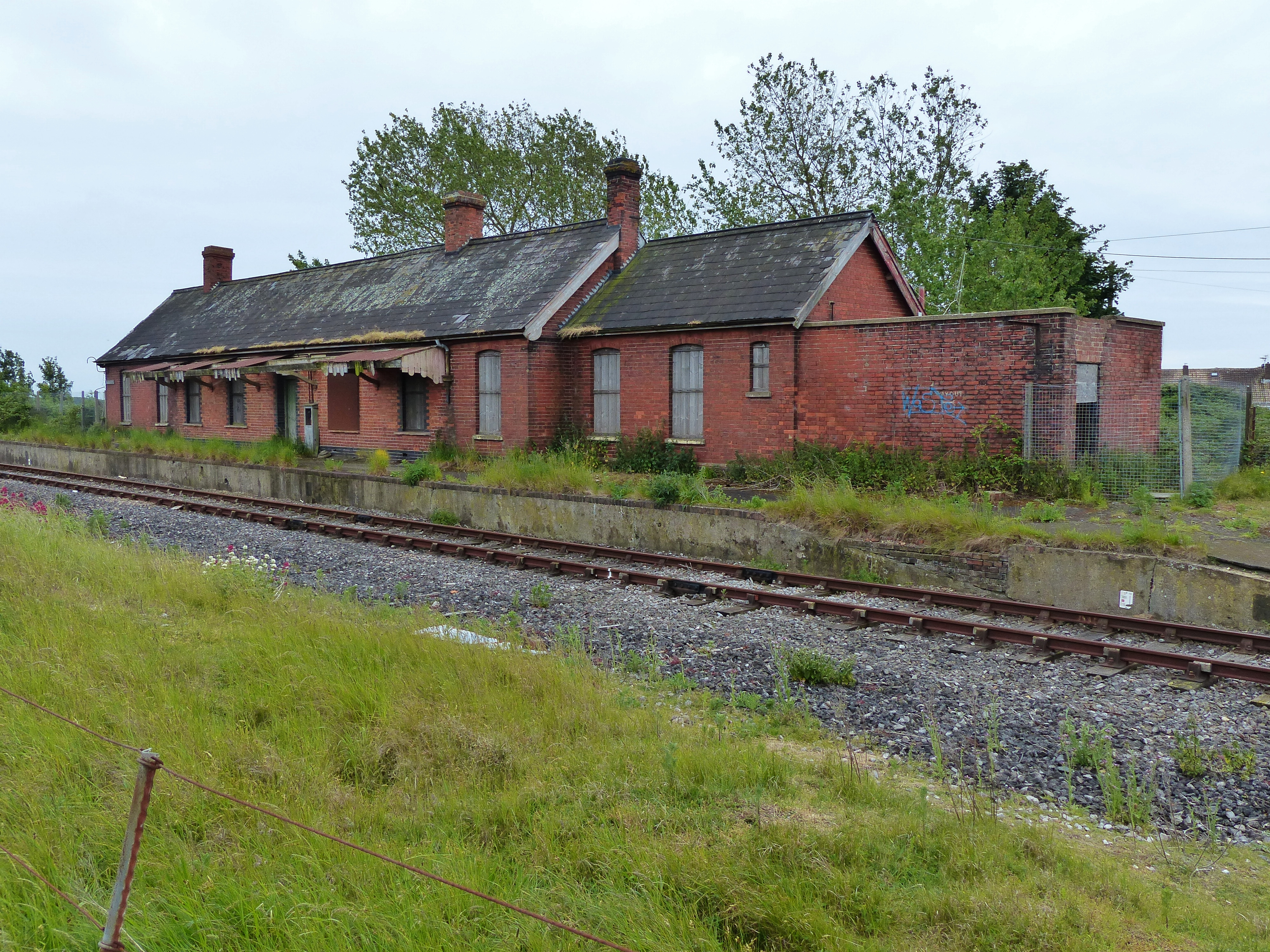
Lydd Town train station, 2008

The future reuse of the station as a "rail transport interchange" has been written into Shepway District Local Plan which safeguards the route against development prejudicial to the reopening of the line from Appledore to the public. Although reopening of the line to passengers has been mooted from time to time – particularly with regard to improving public access to Lydd Airport – the plans have never materialised. One obstacle in the way of reopening is the 13 level crossings and occupational farm crossings between Appledore and Lydd, which would have to be converted to automatic full-barrier crossings with obstacle detection. Furthermore, neither the line through Lydd nor the Ashford to Hastings line is electrified, requiring passengers to change at Ashford International to diesel railcars.

On 7 November 2022 the station building was severely damaged by a fire.The station building is considered a total loss and any future use of the site for passenger services would require new infrastructure.
