= Brookland Halt railway station =

Disused railway station in England

Coordinates: 51°0′8.5″N 0°50′43″E

Brookland Halt
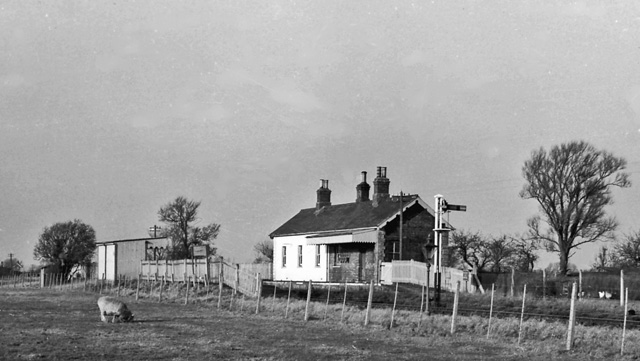
- Brookland Halt in 1967

General information
- Location: Brookland, Folkestone & Hythe; England
- Grid reference: TQ997264
- Platforms: 2 then 1

Other information
- Status: Disused

History
- Pre-grouping: Lydd Railway; South Eastern Railway; South Eastern and Chatham Railway
- Post-grouping: Southern Railway; Southern Region of British Railways

Key dates
- 7 December 1881: Opened (Brookland)
- 1921: Renamed (Brookland Halt)
- 6 March 1967: Closed
Location

Brookland Halt was a railway station which served the village of Brookland in Kent, England. The station opened in 1881 and closed in 1967.

== History ==
Brookland was the first station on the Lydd Railway's New Romney branch line. It opened to traffic on 7 December 1881. The station was ½ mile from Brookland village, one of the larger settlements on Romney Marsh, and an area well known for games and wrestling as well as smuggling. It was located on the north side of the A259 Straight Lane which links the villages of Brenzett and Brookland; a small ground frame shed controlled the level crossing staffed by a resident signal-porter who also sold tickets. Brookland was once an impressive station boasting two platforms, with the main station building on the down side and a small wooden waiting shelter on the up side. A passing loop was also provided, but this was removed in 1921.

As passenger traffic dwindled and freight became insignificant in the post-war period, the New Romney branch fell into decline and subsequently figured in the Beeching Report along with the Ashford to Hastings line. Although the closure was protested against, passenger services ceased on 6 March 1967, with the section between Romney Junction and New Romney closing entirely. The line was retained for goods traffic to Dungeness Power Station.

Preceding station	Disused railways	Following station
Appledore (Kent); Line and station open	BR Southern Region; New Romney branch line	Lydd Town; Line open, station closed

== Present day ==
The station building remains as a private residence and the down platform remains extant if overgrown; the up platform has been partially covered in soil and is heavily overgrown. The line through the station remains open for freight traffic and is subject to a 20 mph speed restriction. The line sees regular nuclear waste traffic from Dungeness nuclear power station.
