= Lydd-on-Sea Halt railway station =

Former railway station in England

Coordinates: 50.9335°N 0.9644°E

Lydd-on-Sea Halt
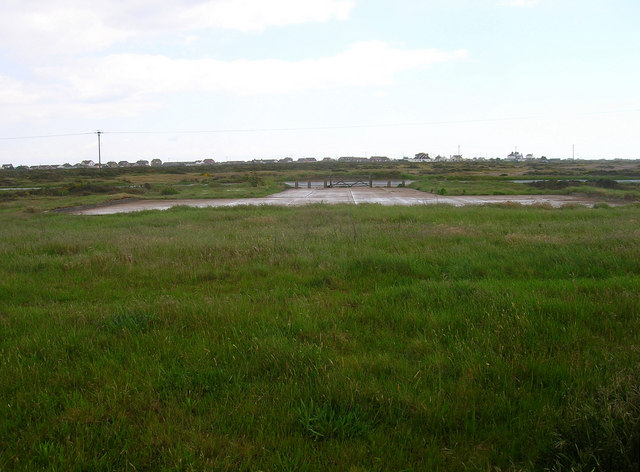
- The site in 2007, showing the former station forecourt road

General information
- Location: Lydd-on-Sea, Folkestone & Hythe; England
- Grid reference: TR084192
- Platforms: 2 (1 from 1954)

Other information
- Status: Disused

History
- Post-grouping: Southern Railway; Southern Region of British Railways

Key dates
- 4 July 1937: Opened (Lydd-on-Sea)
- 20 September 1954: Renamed (Lydd-on-Sea Halt)
- 6 March 1967: Closed
Location

Lydd-on-Sea Halt was a railway station which served the modern village of Lydd-on-Sea in Kent, England. The station opened in 1937 and closed in 1967.

== History ==
Prompted by holiday camp development in the area, the Southern Railway decided in 1937 to realign its branch line to New Romney (which had been opened in 1884) closer to the sea and to open two intermediate stations - Lydd-on-Sea and Greatstone-on-Sea. The opening of Lydd-on-Sea on 4 July 1937 coincided with the closure of Dungeness station to passengers; it was intended that Lydd-on-Sea, ½-mile from Dungeness, would serve both locations and its running in board read "Lydd-on-Sea (for Dungeness)".

To handle the expected flow of holiday traffic, the station was equipped with a long curved island platform with a passing loop on which was perched a small wooden shed. The traffic never materialised and the station was downgraded to an unstaffed halt on 20 September 1954 when its passing loop was also lifted. As passenger traffic dwindled and freight became insignificant, the New Romney branch fell into decline and was listed for closure in the Beeching Report. In 1966 the Minister of Transport Barbara Castle announced her intention of closing the Appledore to New Romney Branch and passenger services ceased on 6 March 1967.

Preceding station	Disused railways	Following station
Lydd Town; Line and station closed	BR Southern Region; New Romney branch line	Greatstone-on-Sea; Line and station closed

== Present day ==
Although the trackbed from Romney Junction towards New Romney is easily traceable, nothing remains of Lydd-on-Sea Halt today except for a gated concrete approach road from Kerton Road . The island platform was demolished at some point after 1983.
