= New Romney and Littlestone-on-Sea railway station =

Former railway station in England

Coordinates: 50.9847°N 0.9531°E

New Romney and Littlestone-on-Sea
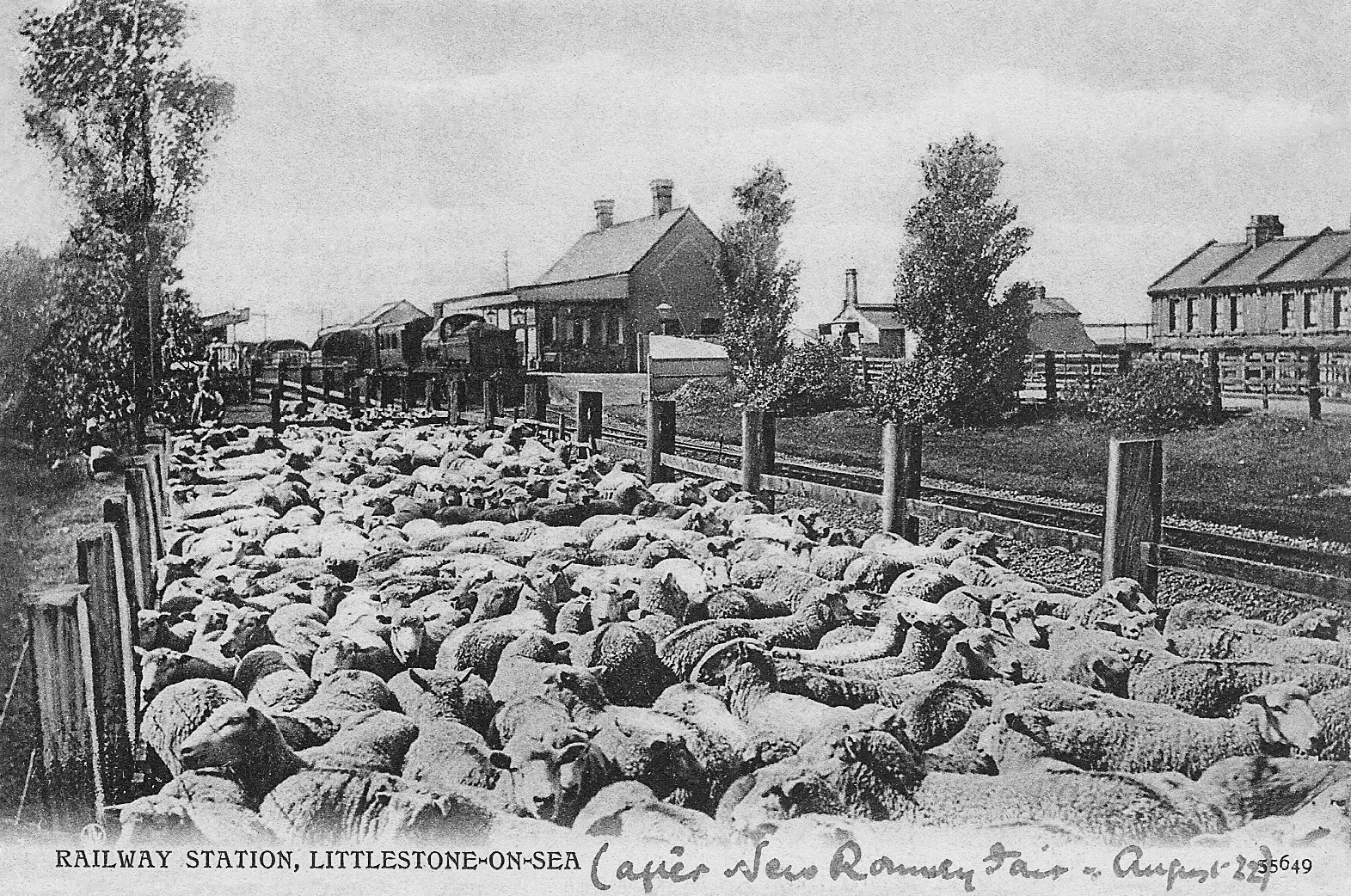

General information
- Location: New Romney and Littlestone-on-Sea, Folkestone & Hythe; England
- Grid reference: TR073247
- Platforms: 2 (1 rarely used)

Other information
- Status: Disused

History
- Pre-grouping: Lydd Railway; South Eastern Railway; South Eastern and Chatham Railway
- Post-grouping: Southern Railway; Southern Region of British Railways

Key dates
- 19 June 1884: Opened as New Romney and Littlestone
- October 1888: Renamed New Romney and Littlestone-on-Sea
- 6 March 1967: Closed
Location

New Romney and Littlestone-on-Sea was a railway station which lay in between the villages of New Romney and Littlestone-on-Sea in Kent, England. The station opened in 1884 and closed in 1967.

== Early years ==
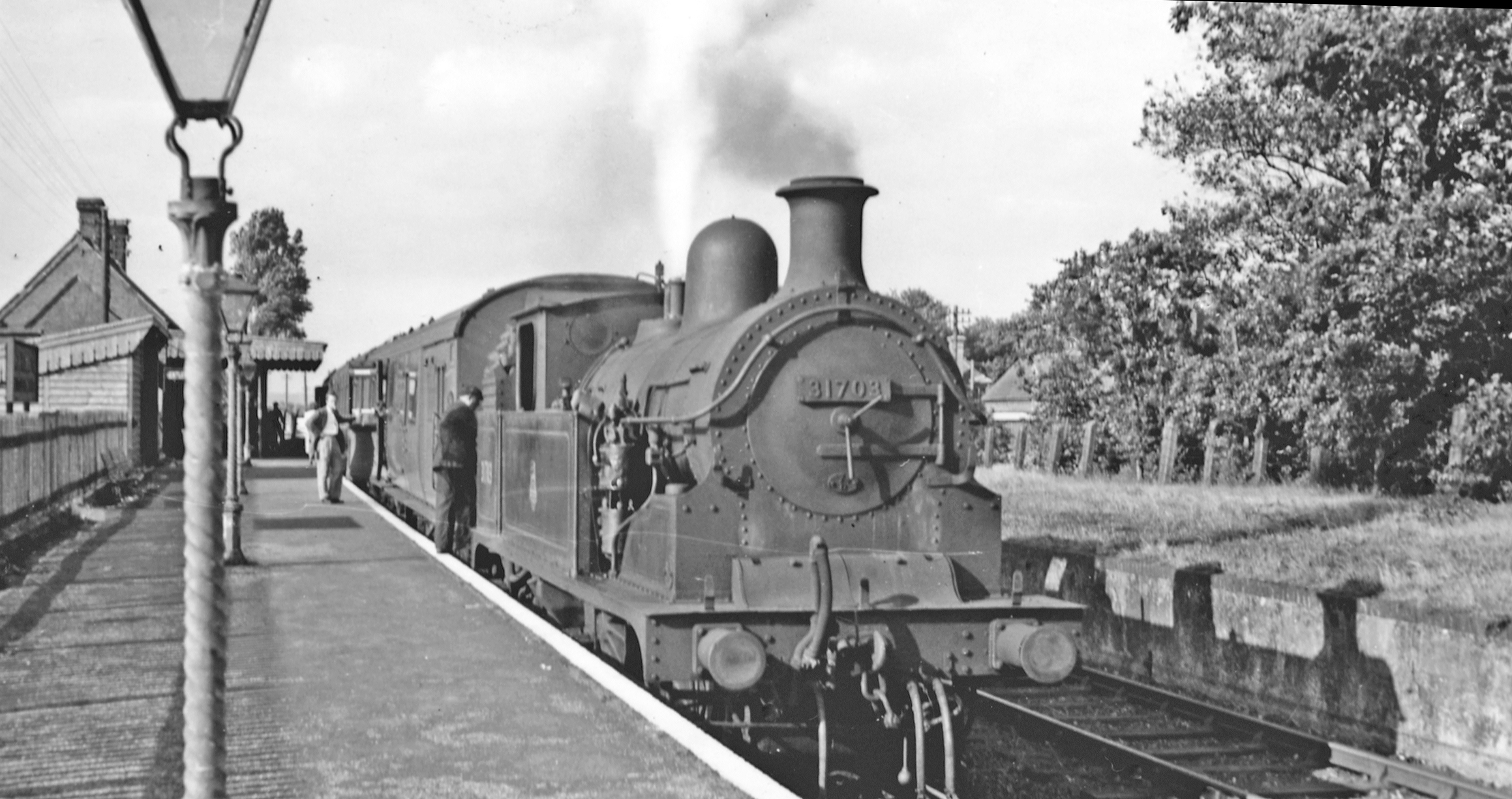
New Romney & Littlestone-on-Sea station, 1952

The station was opened by the Lydd Railway on 19 June 1884, the first day of passenger services on its 3-mile (5 km) branch to New Romney from its existing line between Appledore and Dungeness. At the time, a Victorian block of houses and hotels had been constructed in Littlestone-on-Sea in the hope of creating a seaside resort.

Both railway branches were served by the same train from Appledore; in some cases it went to either New Romney or Dungeness, in others, passengers for New Romney were left at Lydd while the train proceeded to Dungeness with the Lydd stationmaster who would sell tickets to passengers alighting there. The train then returned to Lydd, dropped the Dungeness passengers there, and transported the New Romney passengers to their destination. The service to New Romney in 1905 comprised eight weekday departures from Appledore - four exclusively serving New Romney and four serving New Romney and Dungeness. There was a single Sunday working to New Romney.

== Station buildings ==
New Romney and Littlestone station, which had the suffix on-sea added in 1888, was a small two-platformed terminus equipped with an equally small goods yard. The main station building was located on the down platform, while the goods shed was just to the south-west behind the platform together with coal wharves, an end loading dock, a water tower and other small buildings. In later years the up platform was hardly used other than as a livestock loading dock. In 1927, one of the sidings was extended across the road to deliver coal to the depot of the newly opened Romney, Hythe and Dymchurch Railway (RHDR) which was to open its own New Romney station here.

== Decline and closure ==
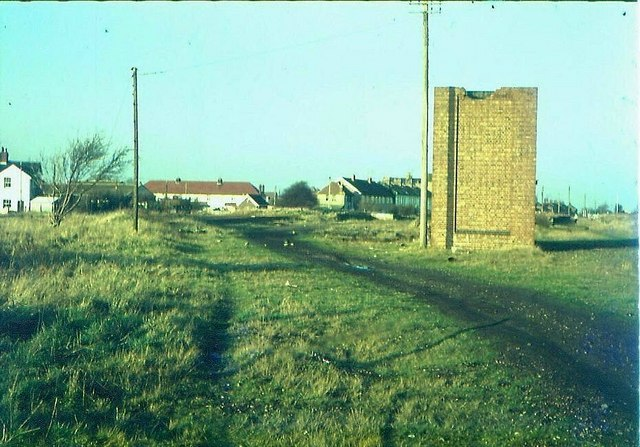
Station site in 1973, showing the base of the water tower to the right and the remains of one platform in the far distance.

In the 1920s the long-awaited seaside development began in earnest. The Southern Railway (which had taken over the line upon the 1923 railway grouping) realigned the New Romney branch nearer the coast in 1937 and provided two intermediate stations - Greatstone-on-Sea and Lydd-on-Sea. However, the Southern had been slow in reacting to the coastal development and the RHDR had already been operating from more conveniently sited stations for the best part of a decade. Furthermore, the pattern of services remained more or less the same until 1952 when it increased to nine services from Appledore to New Romney (including two through trains from Ashford), and four services on Sundays from Ashford. In addition, two direct services from Charing Cross were laid on for summer Saturdays.

Following the electrification of the line to Dover in 1962 and the prohibition of steam on South Eastern metals, the New Romney branch was served by diesel-electric sets with either six-car or three-car units. Although through services from Charing Cross ceased, services remained relatively regular with nine departures from Ashford and two from Appledore on weekdays. The New Romney branch was listed for closure in the Beeching Report but survived until the Minister of Transport Barbara Castle announced her approval to close the Appledore to New Romney Branch and passenger services ceased on 6 March 1967.

Preceding station	Disused railways	Following station
Lydd Town; Line and station closed	Southern Railway; New Romney branch	Terminus
Greatstone-on-Sea Halt; Line and station closed	BR Southern Region; New Romney branch line	Terminus

== Present day ==
Although the trackbed from Romney Junction towards New Romney is easily traceable, nothing remains of New Romney and Littlestone-on-Sea station which has been obliterated by a small trading estate. The site of the siding to the RHDR is now occupied by the west part of its New Romney station carriage sidings.
