= Dungeness railway station (South Eastern Railway) =

Former railway station in England

Coordinates: 50.9151°N 0.9690°E

Dungeness
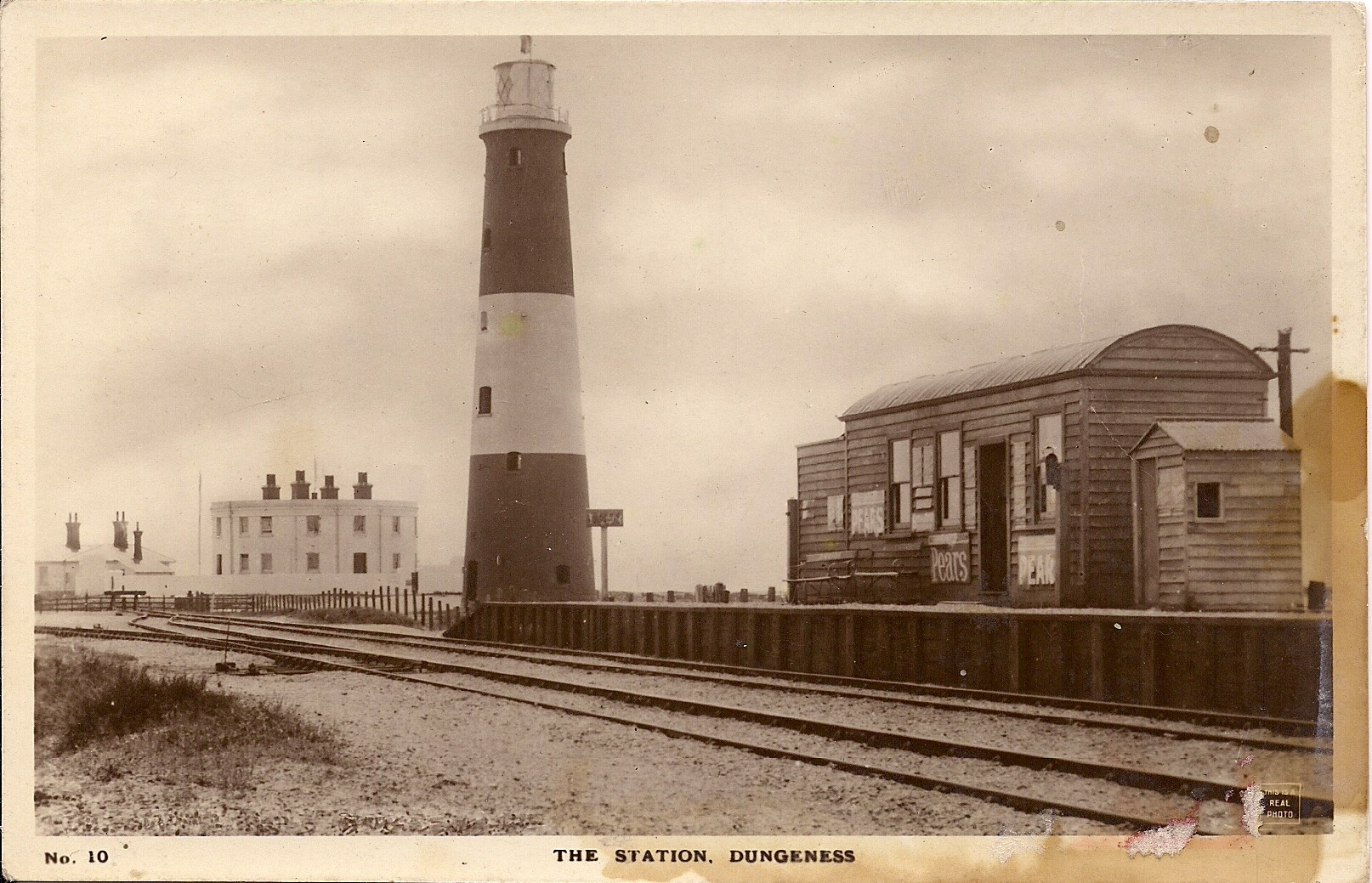

General information
- Location: Dungeness, Folkestone & Hythe; England
- Grid reference: TR088171
- Platforms: 1

Other information
- Status: Disused

History
- Pre-grouping: Lydd Railway Company; South Eastern Railway; South Eastern and Chatham Railway
- Post-grouping: Southern Railway

Key dates
- 1 April 1883: Opened
- 4 July 1937: Closed to passengers
- May 1953: Closed entirely
Location

Dungeness was a railway station which served the Dungeness headland in Kent, England. Opened in 1883 by the Lydd Railway Company, it closed to passengers in 1937. Part of the line which served the station is converted to the main access road as a means of transporting atomic waste from nearby Dungeness nuclear power station.

== History ==
Dungeness was the terminus of the Lydd Railway's branch from Appledore which opened on 7 December 1881. Passenger services initially terminated at Lydd, although a goods service operated as far as Dungeness. The line was opened throughout to passengers as from 1 April 1883. A second branch was opened the following year from a point just south of Lydd to New Romney. The railway terminated almost at the foot of Dungeness lighthouse (1901) where very basic facilities were provided in the shape of a single platform on which was perched a small arched roof weather-boarded shed comprising a ticket office, waiting room and ladies and gents toilets. A run-round loop was provided to facilitate engine reversals and a siding led to the lighthouse.

The promoters of the line had hoped that linking Dungeness, one of the largest expanses of shingle in the world, with London by rail would lead to its development as a port from which cross-channel steamers could operate to the small French fishing port of Le Tréport, 60 miles distant and 114 miles from Paris. Proposals to construct a harbour at Dungeness had been around since the 1870s and received support from South Eastern Railway chairman Edward Watkin; the inexhaustible supply of shingle could, if dug out, have been used for track ballast and to form the basin of what could have been one of the most cheaply built dock systems in the world.

The development of Dungeness failed to materialise and the South Eastern Railway, which had taken over the Lydd Railway in 1895, was left with two short branch lines in a remotely populated area, with the Dungeness branch carrying the lightest of traffic; shingle did provide some traffic, including flints for the Potteries which used them to provide glaze on china. The line survived for a further fifty years, aided somewhat by holiday camp development along the coast which prompted the Southern Railway (which had taken over the line upon the railway grouping of 1923) to realign the New Romney branch closer to the sea (approximately 1¼ miles towards Dungeness) in 1937. The realignment coincided with the closure of Dungeness branch to passengers, leaving it open for goods until May 1953. To make up for the closure of Dungeness, the Southern Railway opened a new station at Lydd-on-Sea (½ mile away) whose running in board read "Lydd-on-Sea (for Dungeness)".

Preceding station	Disused railways	Following station
Lydd; Line and station closed	Southern Railway; Dungeness branch	Terminus

== Present day ==
The Dungeness branch remains open from Appledore to sidings on the site of the old Romney Junction where the original branch to Dungeness left the line to New Romney. Atomic Waste is taken one mile by road from the Dungeness Power Station and is transported away by rail. About half mile of the trackbed of the branch has been converted into the main access road to Dungeness power station. Another half mile section is walkable towards the site of Dungeness station which is approximately 50 yards to the west of the Romney, Hythe and Dymchurch Railway's own Dungeness station. As at 2022 the station site and trackbed is still undeveloped with degraded remains of the clinker and timber platform after years of coastal erosion. The small shelter building has now gone, but its concrete base can still be seen. Many of the shacks scattered around the southern end of Dungeness arrived in the 1920s when Southern Railway workers purchased old rolling stock which were dragged off the end of the line to be used as holiday shacks.
