= Greatstone-on-Sea Halt railway station =

Former railway station in England

Coordinates: 50.9639°N 0.9572°E

Greatstone-on-Sea Halt
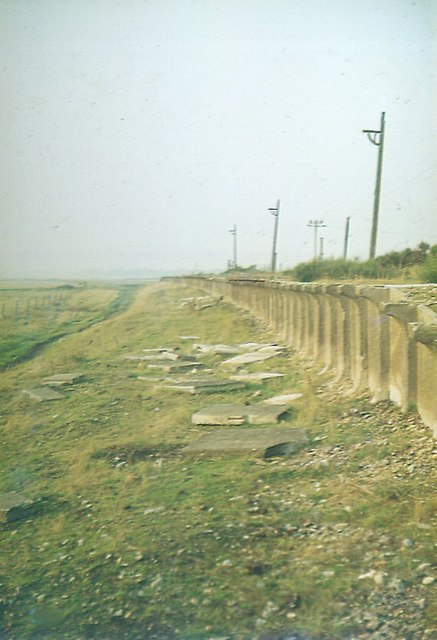
- Station remains in 1973

General information
- Location: Greatstone-on-Sea, Folkestone & Hythe; England
- Grid reference: TR077225
- Platforms: 1

Other information
- Status: Disused

History
- Post-grouping: Southern Railway; Southern Region of British Railways

Key dates
- 4 July 1937: Opened as Greatstone-on-Sea
- 14 June 1954: Renamed Greatstone-on-Sea Halt and destaffed
- 6 March 1967: Closed
Location

Greatstone-on-Sea Halt was a railway station which served the modern village of Greatstone-on-Sea in Kent, England. The station opened in 1937 and closed in 1967.

== History ==
The station came about in 1937 when, in response to holiday camp development in the area, the Southern Railway decided to realign its branch line to New Romney (which had been opened in 1884) closer to the sea and to open two intermediate stations – Lydd-on-Sea and Greatstone-on-Sea. Greatstone was convenient for Greatstone Camp and Maddieson's Holiday Camp and competed with services provided by the Romney, Hythe and Dymchurch Railway (RHDR) which had already been operating in the area for a decade. The station was equipped with basic facilities consisting of a long single platform on the up side with a simple shelter. An extensive concrete forecourt was, however, provided for the coaches which were expected to ferry in crowds of holidaymakers.

The failure of Greatstone to develop into a substantial holiday resort, coupled with the inconvenient siting of the station by comparison with the RHDR's Greatstone Dunes and Romney Sands stations, led to it being downgraded to an unstaffed halt in 1954. As passenger traffic continued to dwindle and freight became insignificant, the New Romney branch fell into decline and was listed for closure in the Beeching Report. In 1966 the Minister of Transport Barbara Castle announced her intention of closing the Appledore to New Romney Branch and passenger services ceased on 6 March 1967.

Preceding station	Disused railways	Following station
Lydd-on-Sea Halt; Line and station closed	BR Southern Region; New Romney branch line	New Romney; Line and station closed

== Present day ==
Although the trackbed from Romney Junction towards New Romney is easily traceable, nothing remains of Greatstone-on-Sea Halt today except for the concrete forecourt, which is used for parking, and a slightly raised area of ground where the platform once lay. The platform was demolished in the 1980s and an access road to a school car park crosses the platform area.
