= Greatstone-on-Sea =

Village in Kent, England

Coordinates: 50.97°N 0.964°E

Greatstone
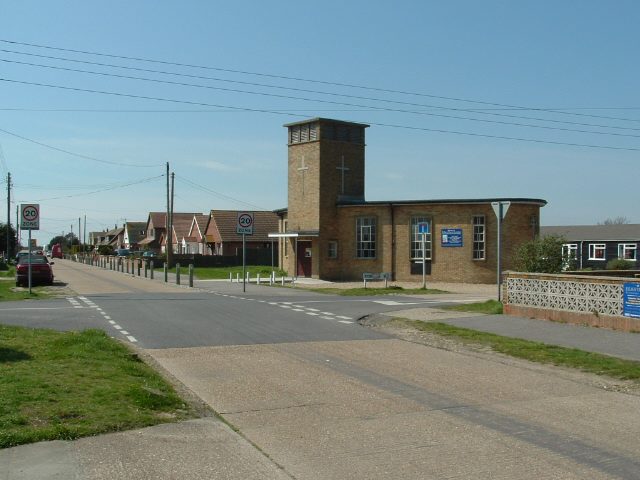
- St Peter's Church

- Location within Kent
- OS grid reference: TR077225
- District: Folkestone and Hythe
- Shire county: Kent
- Region: South East
- Country: England
- Sovereign state: United Kingdom
- Post town: New Romney
- Postcode district: TN28
- Dialling code: 01797
- Police: Kent
- Fire: Kent
- Ambulance: South East Coast
- UK Parliament: Folkestone and Hythe

Greatstone is a village on the coast of Romney Marsh in Kent, England. It is east of the town of New Romney and split between the civil parishes of New Romney and Lydd.

Although permission was given for a company to construct large numbers of homes and facilities in the 1920s, only a small number were actually built. There was widespread development in the 1960s and 1970s, however, leading to a sizable community.

== Amenities ==
The church of St Peter's, built in the 1960s, is a daughter church of All Saints, Lydd.

There is a small group of shops at one end of the town, and the other end adjoins Lydd-on-Sea. The local school is the Greatstone Primary School, from which most students either go on to The Marsh Academy, the Folkestone School for Girls or the Harvey Grammar School.

The beach features on Teletubbies on BBC, Series 1: 11. Windy Day, Dec 14, 2015.

== Transport ==
Greatstone has two main roads from two locations. One way to Lydd, Lydd Airport and East Sussex or another to New Romney and the rest of Kent. The Romney, Hythe and Dymchurch Railway runs through the village with a station at Romney Sands. From 1937 until 1967 the town also had a national railway station at Greatstone-on-Sea Halt.

Stagecoach in East Kent runs local buses to other towns.

== See also ==
- Greatstone Dunes railway station
- Greatstone-on-Sea Halt railway station
- Littlestone-on-Sea
