= Littlestone-on-Sea =

Village in Kent, England

Coordinates: 50.98075°N 0.96415°E

Littlestone
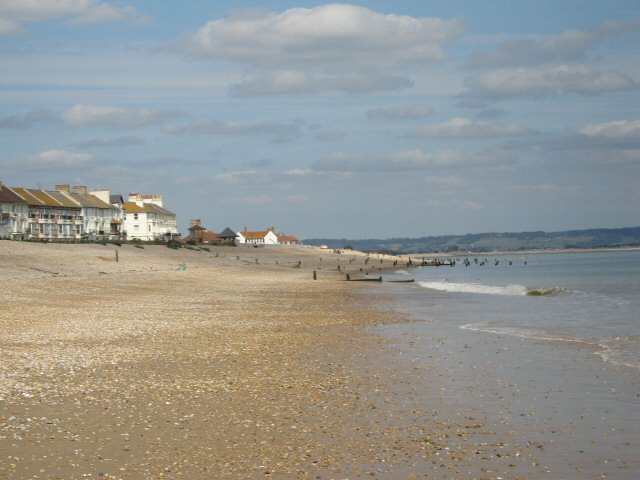
- Littlestone beach

- Location within Kent
- OS grid reference: TR066249
- Civil parish: New Romney
- District: Folkestone and Hythe
- Shire county: Kent
- Region: South East
- Country: England
- Sovereign state: United Kingdom
- Post town: New Romney
- Postcode district: TN28
- Dialling code: 01797
- Police: Kent
- Fire: Kent
- Ambulance: South East Coast
- UK Parliament: Folkestone and Hythe

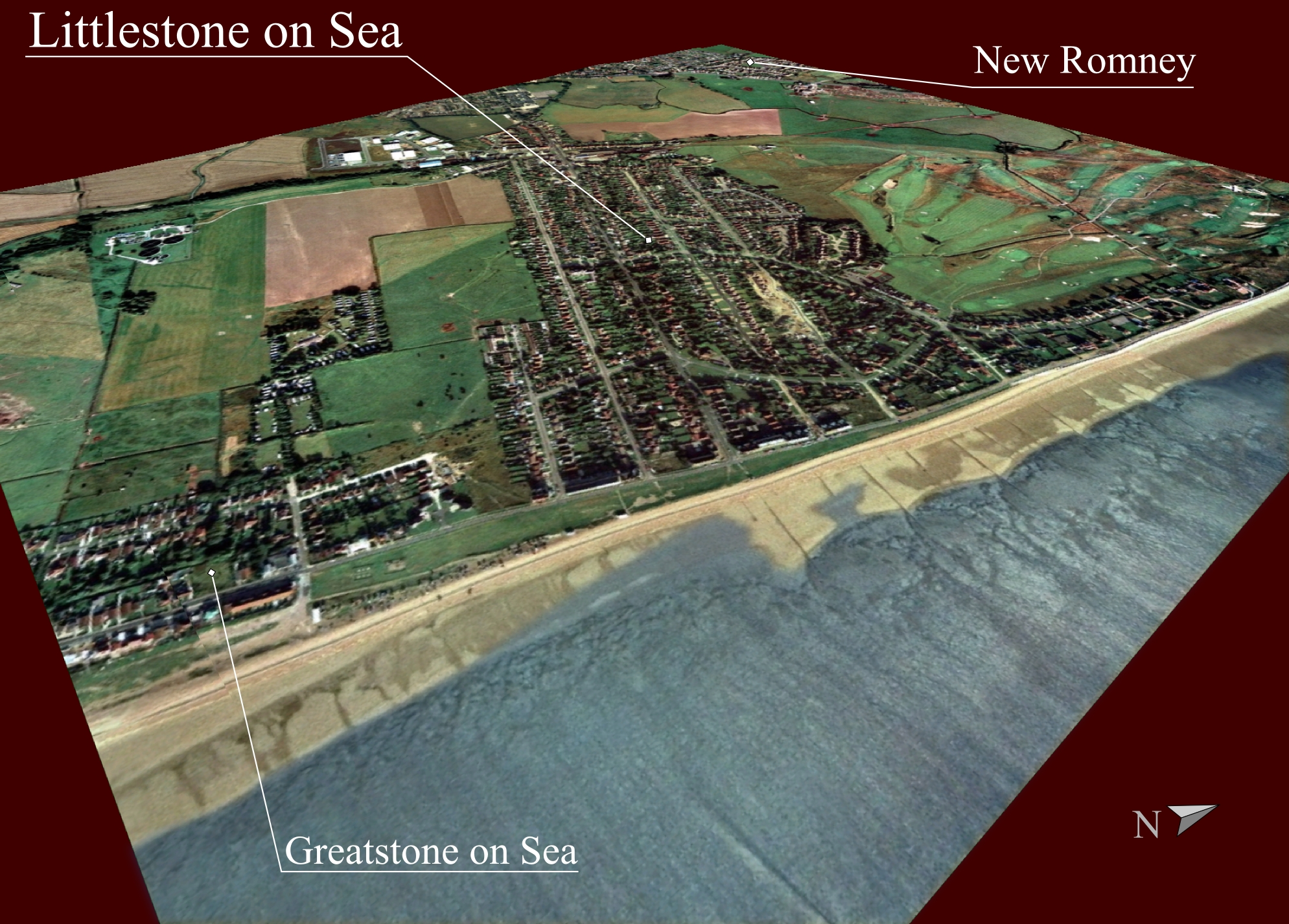
Littlestone on Sea 3D

Littlestone-on-Sea is a small coastal village in the parish of New Romney in Kent, England. It was established in the 1880s by Sir Robert Perks as a resort for the gentry, at the point of the local lifeboat station.

At low tide, a World War II Mulberry Harbour Phoenix breakwater is visible along the coast; the caisson was unable to be refloated as part of the post D-Day harbour construction in Normandy, so was abandoned.

The nature of the Phoenix breakwaters meant they were constructed and sunk until needed (so as to be invisible to air attack); by design they would have had the water evacuated by Royal Engineers and then been towed to France where they would have become part of the harbour. There is a P.L.U.T.O. or Pipe Line Under The Ocean, station, formerly used to carry petrol across to France during the D-Day landings.

== The First Men in the Moon ==
Littlestone is the location of Mr Bedford's landing in the sphere in H. G. Wells' book The First Men in the Moon. Mr Bedford leaves the sphere on the beach and enters a hotel. A local boy called Thomas Simmons (the name of an old school friend of Wells) who witnessed Mr Bedford's arrival later enters and takes off in the sphere and is never seen again.

== Littlestone Golf Club ==
The textile entrepreneur Henry Thomas Tubbs (1831–1917) established Littlestone Golf Club in 1888 on land bought in partnership with Joseph Lewis (c.1830-1889). Tubbs built a house next to the course in 1889 to act as a Clubhouse until the current one was finished in 1910.

This house, which seems to appear as St. Andrew's Villa in the census of 1901, was known then and now as Netherstone. The minutes of the newly formed club committee note that Henry Tubbs as a committed Methodist did not allow alcohol in Netherstone. His nephew points out that this may be contributing to the slow growth in the popularity of the club. Alcohol was available in the 1930s, as narrated by John Bayley in a memoir of his family's holiday home near the golf club.

Netherstone is still a home, being the only house to have a balcony facing the links rather than the sea.

A similar pattern on a grander scale was seen in Finchley, north London, where Henry Tubbs built Nether Court in 1883. This was ultimately to become the clubhouse of Finchley Golf Club in 1929 after his death, and is still in use as such today.

== See also ==
- Greatstone-on-Sea
