= South Eastern Railway (England) =

British pre-grouping railway company

The South Eastern Railway's crest

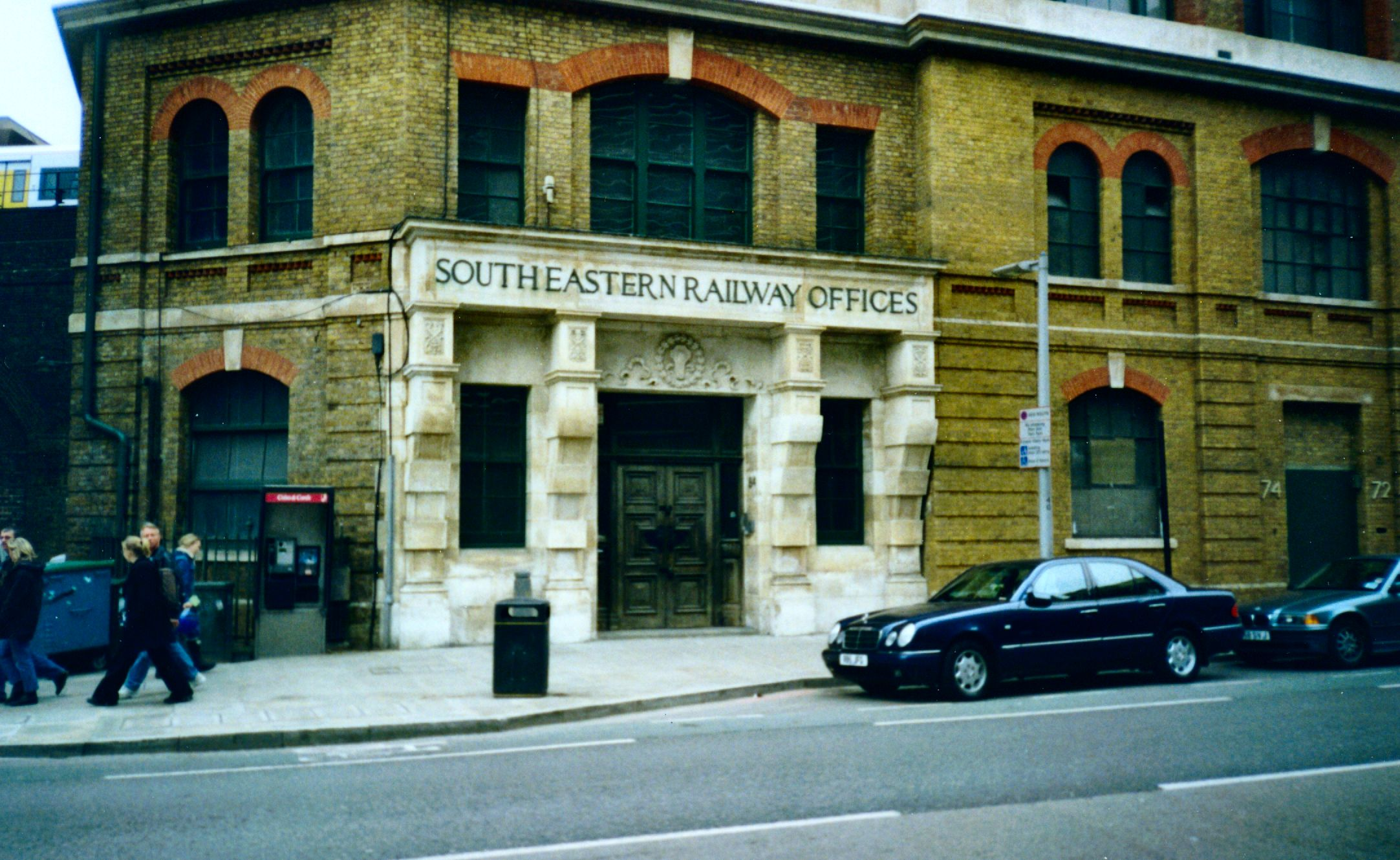
The South Eastern Railway's former headquarters in Tooley Street, London, near London Bridge station.

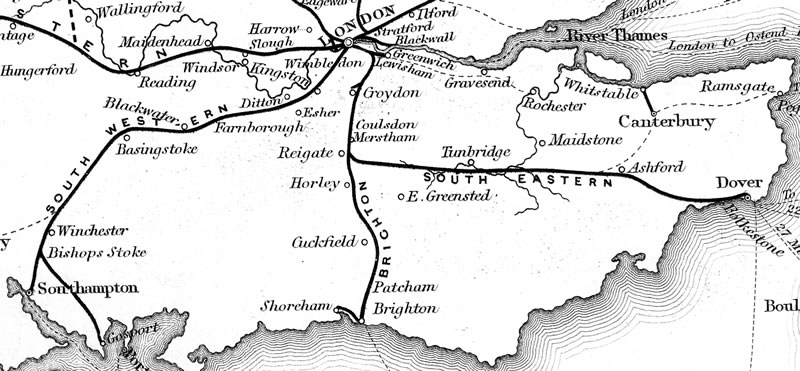
Railways in the South East of England in 1840

Railway lines in Kent, SER lines can be seen alongside LCDR, LBSCR, etc. lines

The South Eastern Railway (SER) was a railway company in south-eastern England from 1836 until 1922. The company was formed to construct a route from London to Dover. Branch lines were later opened to Tunbridge Wells, Hastings, Canterbury and other places in Kent. The SER absorbed or leased other railways, some older than itself, including the London and Greenwich Railway and the Canterbury and Whitstable Railway. Most of the company's routes were in Kent, eastern Sussex and the London suburbs, with a long cross-country route from Redhill in Surrey to Reading, Berkshire.

Much of the company's early history saw attempts at expansion and feuding with its neighbours; the London Brighton and South Coast Railway (LBSCR) in the west and the London, Chatham and Dover Railway (LCDR) to the north-east. However, in 1899 the SER agreed with the LCDR to share operation of the two railways, work them as a single system (marketed as the South Eastern and Chatham Railway) and pool receipts: but it was not a full amalgamation. The SER and LCDR remained separate companies until becoming constituents of the Southern Railway on 1 January 1923.

== Origins of the company ==
South Eastern Railway Act 1836
- Act of Parliament
- Parliament of the United Kingdom
- Long title: An Act for making a Railway from the London and Croydon Railway to Dover, to be called "The Southeastern Railway."
- Citation: 6 & 7 Will. 4. c. lxxv

Dates
- Royal assent: 21 June 1836

Text of statute as originally enacted

South Eastern Railway Act 1842
- Act of Parliament
- Parliament of the United Kingdom
- Long title: An Act to enable the South-eastern Railway Company to raise a further Sum of Money; and to amend the Acts relating to the said Railway.
- Citation: 5 & 6 Vict. c. iii

Dates
- Royal assent: 22 April 1842

Text of statute as originally enacted

There had been proposals for a railway between London and Dover in 1825, 1832 and 1835, but they came to nothing due to opposition from landowners or the difficulties of bridging the River Medway near its mouth. On 21 June 1836, the Parliament of the United Kingdom passed a local act the South Eastern Railway Act 1836 (6 & 7 Will. 4. c. lxxv) incorporating the South Eastern and Dover Railway, which shortly afterwards changed to the South Eastern Railway.

=== Choice of route from London to Dover ===
At the time of inauguration there were two potential rail pathways south from London, and the Speaker of the House of Commons had said no further pathways would be permitted. The SER therefore considered routes to Dover from the proposed London and Southampton Railway line at Wimbledon, or from the existing London and Greenwich Railway (L&GR) at Greenwich. The former left London in the wrong direction and then on a roundabout route. The latter provided a useful way for a northern route via Gravesend, Rochester, and Canterbury, except that lengthening the line beyond Greenwich was blocked by opposition from the Admiralty, and this route would involve tunnelling through the North Downs.

The engineer of the new line, William Cubitt, was also engineer of the London and Croydon Railway (L&CR), which planned to use L&GR lines as far as Corbett's Lane in Bermondsey before turning south towards Croydon. A new connection on this line near to Norwood could provide access to a southerly route to Dover via Tonbridge, Ashford and Folkestone. This was less direct than the northerly route but passed through easier country. It involved one significant 1,387-yard (1,268 m) tunnel through the Shakespeare Cliff near Dover. This was the route first chosen by the SER at its inauguration.

During parliamentary discussions on the proposed route of the London and Brighton Railway (L&BR) during 1837, pressure was put on the SER to divert its proposed route so it could also share the L&BR mainline between Jolly Sailor (Norwood) and Earlswood Common, and then travel eastwards to Tonbridge. Under the scheme proposed by Parliament, the railway from Croydon to Redhill would be built by the L&BR but the SER would have the right to refund half the construction costs and own that part of the line between Merstham and Redhill. The SER gave way to this proposal as it reduced the construction costs, although it resulted in a route 20 miles (32 km) longer than by road, running south for 14.5 miles (23 km) and then turning east. It also meant that its trains from London Bridge passed over the lines of three other companies: the L&GR to Corbett's Lane Junction, the L&CR as far as 'Jolly Sailor', and the L&BR to Merstham.

== Construction of the main line ==
Construction began in 1838 at several places simultaneously, and the Shakespeare Tunnel was complete by May 1841. The L&BR line to Redhill opened on 12 July 1841 and the SER line from Redhill to Tonbridge on 26 May 1842, when SER train services began. The main line reached Ashford on 1 December 1842; the outskirts of Folkestone by 28 June 1843; and Dover by 7 February 1844. On the same day the SER offered to lease the L&BR for 21 years at £100,000 per year, but the offer was turned down. Later that year, the SER refunded to the L&BR £430,000 and took ownership of the southern half of the Croydon-Redhill line. Trains ran toll-free to both companies on this stretch but still had pay on the L&CR from Norwood Junction railway station to Corbett's Lane Junction, and the L&GR into London Bridge.

=== Folkestone and Dover harbours ===
South Eastern Railway (Canterbury and Whitstable and Steam Packets) Act 1853
- Act of Parliament
- Parliament of the United Kingdom
- Long title: An Act for dissolving the Canterbury and Whitstable Railway Company, and for vesting in the South-eastern Railway Company the Undertaking of the South-eastern and Continental Steam Packet Company, and for other Purposes, and of which the Short Title is "The South-eastern Railway (Canterbury and Whitstable and Steam Packets) Act, 1853."
- Citation: 16 & 17 Vict. c. clvi

Dates
- Royal assent: 4 August 1853

Text of statute as originally enacted

In 1843, when the railway reached the edge of Folkestone, the company bought the silted and nearly derelict harbour, built by Thomas Telford in 1809, for £18,000. The SER dredged the harbour and, after a trial with the paddle steamer Water Witch, which also demonstrated that a day excursion from London to Boulogne was feasible, arranged for a packet company to provide a ferry to Boulogne. The following year it established the independent South Eastern and Continental Steam Packet Company, which it absorbed by the South Eastern Railway (Canterbury and Whitstable and Steam Packets) Act 1853 (16 & 17 Vict. c. clvi). James Broadbridge Monger was the master of the Water Witch from 1839 to 1844. From 1844 on, he was master of three vessels which steamed from Dover and Folkestone to Boulogne, Calais and Ostend with passengers and cargo: Lord Warden, Princess Helena and Princess Maude. In December 1848 it opened a steeply graded branch from the Folkestone station to the harbour.

The SER opened Dover (later Dover Town) station on 7 February 1844. This was originally a terminus, but in 1860 the line was continued to Admiralty Pier. Thereafter the SER concentrated most of its resources into developing Folkestone Harbour, which became its principal base for cross-channel ferries. The company had complete control of Folkestone whereas at Dover it had to negotiate with both the Admiralty and the local town council, and the rail route from Boulogne to Paris was better developed than that from Calais.

In 1848 the SER served two steam ships a day between Folkestone and Boulogne, one a day between Dover and Calais, and one between Dover and Ostend.

=== Bricklayers Arms terminus ===
During 1843, before the main line was complete, the SER and the L&CR became anxious about the charges imposed by the L&GR for the use of the terminus at London Bridge and its approaches. Parliament had relaxed restrictions on new railways into London and so SER sought authority to construct a branch from Corbett's Lane to a new temporary passenger terminus and goods station at Bricklayers Arms railway station, for use by both railways, removing the need to use the Greenwich Railway. This opened 1 May 1844. According to Charles Vignoles, 'the making of Bricklayers Arms station was a matter of compulsion in driving the Greenwich people to reasonable terms'. Plans to extend from Bricklayers Arms to a new SER terminus at Hungerford Bridge, nearer the centre of London, were rejected by Parliament. Similarly, a revised proposal to extend the line to Waterloo Road in 1846 was rejected by a committee of Parliament.

The L&GR was nearly bankrupt in 1844 and the SER leased its line from 1 January 1845. It became the Greenwich branch of that railway. Thereafter further developments were at London Bridge, and following a shunting accident during August 1850 which caused the collapse of a large part of the station roof, the SER closed Bricklayers Arms terminus to passenger traffic in 1852 converting it into a goods facility.

== Secondary main lines and branch lines ==
Over the next two decades the SER system spread throughout Kent and Surrey, building lines to connect towns to its main line or acquiring those already in existence.

=== Canterbury and Whitstable Railway ===
In 1844 the SER took over the bankrupt Canterbury and Whitstable Railway, which had opened in 1830. This continued to be worked as an isolated line until the SER reached Canterbury from Ashford in 1846, with its line to Ramsgate.

=== Medway Valley Line ===
The first branch built by the SER was the Medway Valley Line on 24 September 1844, from Paddock Wood to Maidstone. This was continued to Strood railway station on 18 June 1856.

=== Greenwich Line ===
South-eastern Railway Act 1871
- Act of Parliament
- Parliament of the United Kingdom
- Long title: An Act to enable the South-eastern Railway Company to complete their authorised Greenwich Line.
- Citation: 34 & 35 Vict. c. iv

Dates
- Royal assent: 25 May 1871

Text of statute as originally enacted

Leasing the London and Greenwich Railway from 1 January 1845 gave the company control of its main line into London and provided a branch line to Greenwich. Further eastward extension was initially not possible due to opposition from the Greenwich Hospital, but it was eventually opened in 1878 when the line joined the North Kent Line at Charlton.

=== Tunbridge Wells and Hastings Line ===
South Eastern Railway (Branch to Tunbridge Wells) Act 1845
- Act of Parliament
- Parliament of the United Kingdom
- Long title: An Act to enable the South-eastern Railway Company to make or complete a Branch Railway from the South-eastern Railway at Tunbridge to Tunbridge Wells.
- Citation: 8 & 9 Vict. c. clxvii

Dates
- Royal assent: 31 July 1845

Text of statute as originally enacted

A secondary main line from Tonbridge to the outskirts of Tunbridge Wells opened 20 September 1845. It was extended to Tunbridge Wells Central on 25 November 1846. By 1 September 1851 the line had reached Robertsbridge and was extended to Battle, Bopeep Junction and Hastings on 1 February 1852. By this time Hastings had already been reached by the SER in a roundabout route from Ashford, which opened 13 February 1851. From this line was a short branch to Rye Harbour.

=== Ramsgate, Margate and Deal Lines ===
During 1846 the SER opened another secondary main line from Ashford to Ramsgate with a branch from there to Margate on 1 December 1846. A further branch from this line from Minster to Deal was opened 7 July 1847.

=== Gravesend and Strood Lines (North Kent) ===
Gravesend and Rochester Railway and Canal Act 1845
- Act of Parliament
- Parliament of the United Kingdom
- Long title: An Act to enable the Company of Proprietors of the Thames and Medway Canal to raise a further Sum of Money; and to amend the Acts relating to the said Company; and to enable the said Company to widen, extend, and maintain a Railway from Gravesend to Rochester.
- Citation: 8 & 9 Vict. c. clxviii

Dates
- Royal assent: 31 July 1845

Text of statute as originally enacted

As the SER was prevented from extending its Greenwich line, it opened a secondary main line from Lewisham to Gravesend and then to Strood on the banks of the Medway on 30 July 1849. The second half between Gravesend and Strood had been built as the Gravesend and Rochester Canal and a single track railway had been added to form the Gravesend and Rochester Railway. The SER offered to buy the canal and railway in 1845, filled in the canal through the Higham to Strood tunnel and doubled the track. The first section (built by the SER) connected Woolwich and Dartford to the railway network.

In 1852 a freight branch was constructed from this line at Charlton to the Thames at Angerstein's Wharf, used for landing coal. A line opened on 18 June 1856 up the Medway valley to Maidstone West.

== Early management of the company 1843–1855 ==
In September 1845 the SER appointed James Macgregor (sometimes spelled McGregor or M'Gregor) to a new post combining the roles of Chairman and Managing Director. He exercised absolute power over the company for the next nine years, until he was ultimately forced to resign in 1854 and leave the Board in 1855. Macgregor's lack of accountability, his opaque and at times dubious working methods led to a number of strategic errors in the building of new lines and in the company's relations with its neighbours, which would have an adverse impact on the company for decades to come.

=== Reading, Guildford and Reigate Railway ===
Reading, Guildford and Reigate Railway Act 1846
- Act of Parliament
- Parliament of the United Kingdom
- Long title: An Act for making a Railway from Reading to Guildford and Reigate.
- Citation: 9 & 10 Vict. c. clxxi

Dates
- Royal assent: 16 July 1846

Reading, Guildford and Reigate Railway Amendment Act 1847
- Act of Parliament
- Parliament of the United Kingdom
- Long title: An Act to authorize a certain Alteration in the Line of the Reading, Guildford, and Reigate Railway, and to amend the Act relating thereto.
- Citation: 10 & 11 Vict. c. ccxli

Dates
- Royal assent: 22 July 1847

Text of statute as originally enacted

South Eastern and Reading, Guildford and Reigate Railways Amalgamation Act 1852
- Act of Parliament
- Parliament of the United Kingdom
- Long title: An Act for merging the Undertaking of the Reading, Guildford, and Reigate Railway Company in the Undertaking of the South-eastern Railway Company; for the Dissolution of the Beading, Guildford, and Reigate Railway Company; and for other Purposes.
- Citation: 15 & 16 Vict. c. ciii

Dates
- Royal assent: 17 June 1852

Text of statute as originally enacted

South-eastern Railway (Reading Extension) Act 1853
- Act of Parliament
- Parliament of the United Kingdom
- Long title: An Act to enable the South-eastern Railway Company to extend the Reading, Guildford, and Reigate Railway to the Great Western Railway at Reading; and for other Purposes.
- Citation: 16 & 17 Vict. c. cxxi

Dates
- Royal assent: 4 August 1853

Text of statute as originally enacted

The SER supported the formation of the Reading, Guildford and Reigate Railway under the Reading, Guildford and Reigate Railway Act 1846 (9 & 10 Vict. c. clxxi), a scheme to build a line connecting the London to Brighton main line at Redhill with the Great Western Railway (GWR) main line at Reading, and agreed to operate its services. The new line was completed 4 July 1849, and in 1852 was absorbed by SER under the South Eastern and Reading, Guildford and Reigate Railways Amalgamation Act 1852 (15 & 16 Vict. c. ciii). Both the LBSCR and London and South Western Railway (L&SWR) regarded this line as a significant incursion into their areas of operation. Likewise the acquisition of a line so remote from its main area of operation, and of doubtful profitability, caused heated discussion and the resignation of several directors, who felt that the company should rather secure its territory and develop services in Kent, as the LBSCR was doing in Sussex. It would also ultimately bring about Macgregor's downfall. Nevertheless, in 1858 the GWR, L&SWR, and SER made a three-year agreement to share traffic and provide a connecting line between their stations at Reading. As of 2015 the line forms part of the North Downs Line.

=== Early relations with the London Brighton and South Coast Railway ===
During the first years, relations between the SER, L&CR and L&BR were cordial, with the companies pooling locomotives and forming a joint locomotive committee. However, all three considered they were disadvantaged by this arrangement and in 1845 gave notice of withdrawal. The merger of the L&BR and L&CR to form the LBSCR in July 1846 created a powerful rival to the SER in areas of east Sussex and east Surrey not yet connected to the railway. Relations between the two companies were bad from the outset, especially at those sites where they shared facilities, such as the approaches to London Bridge, East Croydon, and Redhill. Also the SER had long wanted to build a line to Brighton, and the LBSCR had inherited plans for a line into mid-Kent from the L&CR, and from Bulverhythe (St Leonards) to Ashford via Hastings from the L&BR. Matters were further complicated in 1846 when the SER was empowered to build a line from its existing branch at Tunbridge Wells to Hastings.

Unsuccessful discussions took place regarding a merger of the two companies, but eventually an agreement on 10 July 1848 (ratified in Parliament in 1849) abolished tolls for using each other's lines and prevented further eastward expansion by the LBSCR beyond Hastings and westward further expansion by the SER. Under this agreement the LBSCR, would share the line from Bulverhythe to Hastings and transfer to the SER its rights to build a line to Ashford but at the same time it retained the right to use the Bricklayers Arms branch and construct its own 15-acre (61,000 m^{2}) goods depot on the site for a rent of one shilling (£0.05) per year.

The 1848/9 agreement did not prevent further squabbling between the two companies, notably with the opening of the railway from Ashford to Hastings in 1851. The LBSCR had originally sought to build it and then had attempted to delay its completion by the SER. In retaliation, the SER attempted to deny LBSCR access to its station at Hastings. The matter was resolved in court in favour of the LBSCR, but victory was short-lived as the following year the SER opened its lines from Tunbridge Wells, reducing the distance by rail to Hastings from London.

=== Closing the capital account ===
Macgregor's greatest strategic mistake was his failure to address the concerns of the proposers of the East Kent Railway, which ultimately led to the creation of an important rival in northern Kent and also for the Continental rail traffic.

Between 1844 and 1858, the SER had a monopoly of rail transport in Kent, but served the north of the county poorly. The SER line from Strood into London had opened in 1849. A plan to continue this line as far as Chilham where it would join the Ashford to Canterbury Line, was rejected by Parliament in 1847 due to financial considerations and never resurrected. One group of SER directors were anxious to 'close the capital account' and build no more lines, even though this might leave the field open to rival projects, as would later prove to be the case. As a result, there was no planned service to the north Kent towns to the east of the River Medway. Likewise SER routes to Margate, Deal, and Canterbury were circuitous and other towns had no railway at all. As a result of the railway's unwillingness to act, plans for an independent line from the SER station at Strood to Faversham and Canterbury were made following a public meeting at Rochester in 1850.

== Factionalism and bad management 1854–1866 ==
Following Macgregor's resignation in 1854, there followed a decade of factionalism among the directors and equally poor management, described by Samuel Smiles the company Secretary as 'not so much business as speech-making, that seemed to be the work of the Board.' It was during this period that there was a continuing failure to deal with underlying problems in the company, and its relationships with its neighbours together with further strategic errors which weakened what might otherwise have been a profitable enterprise. One nickname for the SER in the 1860s was the Rattle and Smash Railway.

=== East Kent and London Chatham & Dover Railways ===
The East Kent Railway (EKR) from Strood to Canterbury, proposed in 1850 was approved by the East Kent Railway Act 1853 (16 & 17 Vict. c. cxxxii), and also for an extension to Dover in 1855, but it failed to secure running powers over the SER line into London: instead the SER reluctantly agreed to handle London traffic from the line. Many SER directors were convinced the line would never be built, or would go bankrupt, and so took no interest in the scheme or in suggestions that the line should amalgamate with their railway. They were proved wrong.

In 1856 the EKR again unsuccessfully sought running powers over the SER into London, and then obtained powers to build its own route via St Mary Cray railway station and Bromley South railway station. The EKR secured running powers over the LBSCR lines into Pimlico and, after 1860, to Victoria Station. The EKR became the London, Chatham and Dover Railway (LCDR) in 1859 and completed its rival route to Dover on 22 July 1861. By July 1863 the LCDR had its own independent route to Victoria, and in 1864 its own terminus on the edge of the City of London at Ludgate Hill. For 36 years it would be an important competitor of the SER both for Continental and also local traffic in Kent.

A further serious strategic mistake was the refusal of the SER to accept the terms of the contract for the cross-channel carriage of mails in 1862, as this stipulated the use of Dover rather than Folkestone. This enabled the LCDR, which had only reached Dover in 1861, to secure the contract and the following year would give it leverage when it came to negotiating the Continental Traffic Agreement.

=== Continued bad relations with the London Brighton and South Coast Railway ===
A new and protracted dispute with the LBSCR took place between 1855 and 1862 over the Caterham branch line, which was built by an independent company in SER territory but connected to the railway network at the former LBSCR station at Purley. The SER refused to allow the line to be leased to the LBSCR, which in turn refused to re-open its station, delayed opening of the line for a year, and made the Caterham company bankrupt. The SER took over the line in 1859, but the LBSCR made life difficult for passengers to London.

The SER objected to the LBSCR agreement with the East Kent Railway to provide access over its lines to its Pimlico station and later the jointly owned Victoria station (see below), and also for handling that company's freight traffic at 'Willow Walk', (a part of the Bricklayers Arms goods facility). Further difficulties between occurred at East Croydon railway station in 1862. With completion of the LBSCR line to Victoria station, extra platforms were needed to accommodate the service. The platforms were treated by the LBSCR as a separate station, named "New Croydon", with its own ticket office, and ran exclusively LBSCR services. This enabled the railway to offer cheaper fares from New Croydon to London than the SER which only had use of East Croydon station. The SER responded by gaining an act of Parliament giving approval to build its own line from New Beckenham to a new station at Croydon (Addiscombe Road), which opened 1 April 1864.

Relations with the LBSCR reached a low point in 1863, when the general manager and secretary had to report the history of relations between the companies since the agreement of 1848–9. This set out the history although from the SER perspective.

A branch from Lewisham to Beckenham opened in 1857, becoming the temporary terminus of the East Kent Railway. Following the dispute with the LBSCR over New Croydon (see below) an extension of this line to Addiscombe (Croydon) was opened in 1864.

=== Continental Traffic Agreement (1863) ===
The SER and the LCDR agreed to pool Continental traffic receipts between Hastings and Margate, together with local receipts to Dover and Folkestone. It then re-allocated them to a formula which gave the SER two-thirds of the receipts in 1863, gradually reducing to one half in 1872. The agreement appeared to unduly favour the LCDR, particularly after 1870. It did not prevent competition as the railways could claim additional funds from the pool if they carried more than their proportion of customers. Both companies sought to get round the agreement – the LCDR by establishing a Continental service from Queenborough on the Isle of Sheppey, which was outside the scope of the agreement. Similarly, the SER built a local station at Shorncliffe on the edge of Folkestone, which it claimed was not part of Folkestone, and from which it charged lower fares.

Following establishment of a LCDR service from Queenborough to Flushing, Netherlands in 1876, the SER was allowed to build the Hundred of Hoo Railway from its line near Gravesend to a new port on the across the Medway from Queenborough, called Port Victoria. The line opened in September 1882.

=== Improvements to the main line ===
In 1860 the LCDR had a more direct route to Dover than the SER, and both the company's rivals had access to a London terminus in the prosperous West End of London while the SER only had its terminal on the south side of the river Thames at London Bridge.

==== Charing Cross and Cannon Street Stations ====
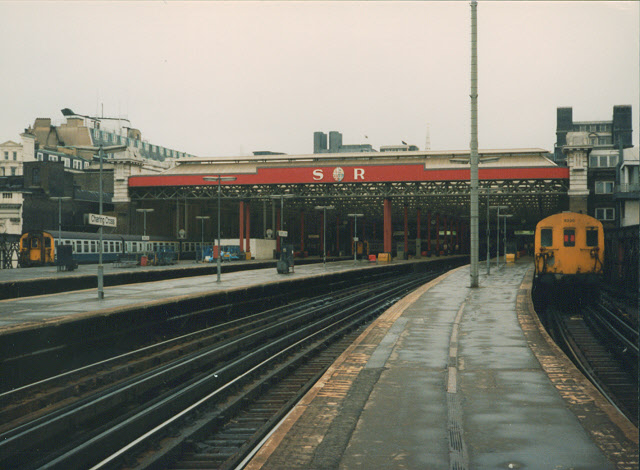
Charing Cross before it was built over with offices with the later SR initials retained.

The SER converted part of London Bridge to through platforms and extended to near Waterloo, over Hungerford Bridge to a station at Charing Cross which opened on 11 January 1864. When the LCDR built a line to Ludgate Hill railway station in the City of London in 1865, the SER built a new bridge over the Thames and a city terminus at Cannon Street railway station, which opened 1 September 1866. These extensions were difficult to operate and were congested at peak times.

On 16 August 1866 the SER agreed with the London and North Western Railway to build a joint line between Euston railway station and Charing Cross, with interchange of traffic, but the scheme was abandoned as a result of the 1867 financial crisis.

==== Orpington cut-off and Dartford Loop ====
The SER therefore constructed the direct line via Sevenoaks to Tonbridge. It involved crossing the North Downs by summits and long tunnels at Knockholt and Sevenoaks. The latter was the longest tunnel in southern England at 3,451 yards (3,156 m). This cut-off line, 24 miles (39 km) long, reached Chislehurst on 1 July 1865, but took three more years to reach Orpington and Sevenoaks (2 March 1868). The new main line opened on 1 May 1868 when the line reached Tonbridge.

Construction of the main line provided the opportunity to build an improved route to Dartford from Hither Green via Sidcup. This opened 1 September 1866.

==== East London Railway ====
In 1865 the SER joined a consortium of six railways to form the East London Railway, which used the existing Thames Tunnel to connect Wapping on the north bank of the Thames with Rotherhithe on the south. The other partners were: the Great Eastern Railway (GER), the London, Brighton and South Coast Railway (LBSCR), the London, Chatham and Dover Railway (LCDR), the Metropolitan Railway, and the District Railway. Over the next four years it was converted to railway use and connected with existing lines.

The line was principally used for freight across London but the SER introduced a service between Addiscombe and Liverpool Street from April 1880 until March 1884. From March to September 1884 the service ran from Addiscombe to St Mary's Whitechapel Road.

== Chairmanship of Edward Watkin ==
This period of factionalism was eventually ended with the appointment of a new and able Chairman in March 1866. This was Edward (later Sir Edward) Watkin who was also chairman of the Manchester, Sheffield and Lincolnshire Railway and the Metropolitan Railway, as well as being a director of the Chemins de fer du Nord in France. However his appointment was quickly followed by the collapse of bankers Overend, Gurney and Company on 10 May 1866 and the subsequent financial crisis during the following year. This had a severe effect on expansion plans of several railways. No new lines were built by the SER until the opening of the Sandling to Hythe branch line on 9 October 1874. The LCDR went bankrupt and was taken into administration 12 July 1866, and in 1867 the LBSCR was also on the brink of bankruptcy. The directors and shareholders saw that constant quarrelling between the three companies had damaged their interests and began talks to merge or to work together. In 1868 a bill was presented to Parliament to allow for co-operative working of railways of southern England (the SER, the LCDR, the LBSCR and the L&SWR). However this failed at a late stage when Parliament sought to limit the fares charged by the SER to those of the LBSCR, and the SER withdrew. A further attempt to merge the SER and LCDR in 1875 failed when the latter withdrew after shareholders felt it favoured the SER.

Watkin had long-term ambitions for the SER to become one link in a chain of 'Watkin' railways from the industrial north of England to the Continent via a proposed Channel Tunnel. His plans for a Channel Tunnel were ultimately blocked by the War Office, and suspicion fell on James Staats Forbes, chairman of the LCDR for having urged the decision.

=== Oxted & Westerham Lines ===
One result of improved relations between the SER and the LBSCR during the 1870s was that the two collaborated in construction of a line between South Croydon on the main Brighton line and Oxted. The completion of the Orpington cut-off in 1866 reduced services to and from the growing town of Croydon. The LBSCR had supported a plan to build the Surrey and Sussex Junction Railway along this route in 1865, but its involvement had been opposed by the SER as being contrary to their agreement, and the scheme was abandoned during the 1867 financial crisis. However, following a revised agreement, the scheme was revived as a joint venture. Beyond Oxted the LBSCR linked with its lines to East Grinstead and Tunbridge Wells, while the SER joined its original main line to Tonbridge Tunbridge Wells and Hastings. Authority for construction of these lines was granted in 1878 and they opened in 1884.

As a part of the same scheme, the SER at last began to implement plans for the a line from Dunton Green on its new main line to Oxted via Westerham, the first phase of which opened on 7 July 1881. Authorisation for line was first obtained in 1864, but no progress had been made by 1876, when local inhabitants sponsored their own bill, forcing the hand of the SER. In the event only the first phase (from Dunton Green to Westerham) was built, leaving a branch line rather than a through route. The remaining four miles (6 km) to the new Oxted Line (then still under construction) were never completed due to opposition in the House of Commons and the difficult terrain between Westerham and Oxted.

=== Unpopularity of the SER ===
South-eastern Railway Act 1887
- Act of Parliament
- Parliament of the United Kingdom
- Long title: An Act for conferring further powers with reference to the South-eastern Railway Company's undertaking and the undertakings of other Companies and for other purposes.
- Citation: 50 & 51 Vict. c. cx

Dates
- Royal assent: 12 July 1887

Text of statute as originally enacted

During the 1880s and 1890s the SER was accused of only caring about Continental travellers and of neglecting the interests of its other customers. A series of letters to The Times in London in 1883 demonstrated how unpopular the railway had become with its regular commuters. Ernest Foxwell, also writing in 1883, stated 'The great blots on the South Eastern are its unpunctuality, its fares, its third class carriages, and the way in which local interests are sacrificed to Continental traffic.' Hamilton Ellis later described both the SER and the LCDR at this time as 'bywords of poverty stricken inefficiency and dirtiness'. In spite of these criticisms the shareholders stuck with their chairman, until they eventually realised that their own interests were suffering as well. A scathing article in The Investors Review for June 1894 demonstrated how poorly Watkin's railways had performed financially compared to others, and referred to the SER's 'bitter hatred towards all but first-class travellers, [and] their determined cultivation of the art of running empty coaches'. The article finished,

the Company is now almost too weak to turn round and adopt a wise policy. It might become bankrupt in the process; so the best thing to do is to leave it severely alone. Just as none travel by it who can find another route, so none should touch its common stocks who are free to do otherwise.

Watkin retired shortly afterwards.

Some of the complaints of unpunctuality of the SER may have been exaggerated, or were at least soon remedied after Watkin's departure, since a statistical survey of the company's services conducted in 1895 by William Acworth found that, with the exception of the heavily congested and difficult to operate lines between London Bridge and Cannon Street and Charing Cross, the company did not perform significantly worse than others in London in terms of timekeeping.

=== Later branches and proposed lines ===
South Eastern Railway Act 1897
- Act of Parliament
- Parliament of the United Kingdom
- Long title: An Act for conferring further powers on the South Eastern Railway Company and for other purposes.
- Citation: 60 & 61 Vict. c. ccxxvii

Dates
- Royal assent: 6 August 1897

Text of statute as originally enacted

During the 1870s and the 1880s the railway attempted to exploit the potential of the East Kent coast as both holiday destinations and potential new channel ports. Thus branches were built from Sandling near Folkestone to Hythe and Sandgate, (opened 9 October 1874); from Dover to Deal and Sandwich (jointly with the LCDR, which opened 15 June 1881); from Appledore to Dungeness (1 April 1883) and New Romney (19 June 1884). (In 1897 the SER obtained powers in the South Eastern Railway Act 1897 (60 & 61 Vict. c. ccxxvii) to build a branch line from Crowhurst railway station to its own station at Bexhill-on-sea in opposition to the existing LBSCR service to the town.) However this line was not completed until 1902.

On 4 July 1887 the railway opened the Elham Valley Line from Canterbury West to Shorncliffe. However, there was by then already an LCDR line from Canterbury to Dover and so the new line did not attract much traffic. Likewise on 1 October 1892 the Hawkhurst Branch from Paddock Wood to Hope Mill was opened and extended to Hawkhurst on 4 September 1893.

Similarly the company also obtained an act of Parliament giving powers to build a line from Appledore to Maidstone via Headcorn and the Loose Valley.

==== Chatham extension ====
Probably the most wasteful competitive venture by the SER was a second bridge over the river Medway between Strood leading to a branch to Rochester (opened July 1891) and to Chatham. The branch line only had a twenty-year life-span as the stations were less conveniently sited than the LCDR alternatives. The LCDR main line was however re-aligned after 1911 to use the newer bridge.

=== London suburbs ===
Unlike the neighbouring LBSCR, the SER failed to capitalise on the rapidly growing population of the South London suburbs during the 1870s and 1880s, and to develop effective suburban services. In particular, the area between the North Kent Line the Dartford Loop Line became well populated at this time, but the SER was reluctant to build a proposed Bexleyheath Line, including stations at Blackheath, Eltham, Bexleyheath and Slade Green, in spite of public pressure in the 1880s. This line was eventually built as a private concern in 1895, and it was only after the original investors had gone bankrupt and Watkin had retired that the SER eventually agreed to incorporate it into its system.

As mentioned above, the line from London Bridge to Charing Cross and Cannon Street was particularly congested and difficult to operate. During the early 1890s the SER was actively considering extending the Bricklayers Arms branch into Charing Cross and Cannon Street as a means of relieving this congestion, but deferred making any decision to do so and ultimately the idea was dropped following the operating agreement with the LCDR in 1899, which provided the new 'joint railway' with two further pathways into London.

One of the last branch lines to be incorporated into the SER was between Purley and Tattenham Corner railway station. The line as far as Chipstead and Kingswood were built by the Chipstead Valley Railway from 1893 and opened in 1897. The extension to Tattenham Corner was built by the Epsom Downs Extension Railway from 1894. Both companies were acquired by the SER, but the line to Tattenham Corner was not completed until 1901, after the working agreement with the LCDR. This line was in the territory of the LBSCR but provided the railway with access to a proportion of the lucrative Epsom Downs Racecourse traffic.

== South Eastern and Chatham Railways Joint Management Committee ==
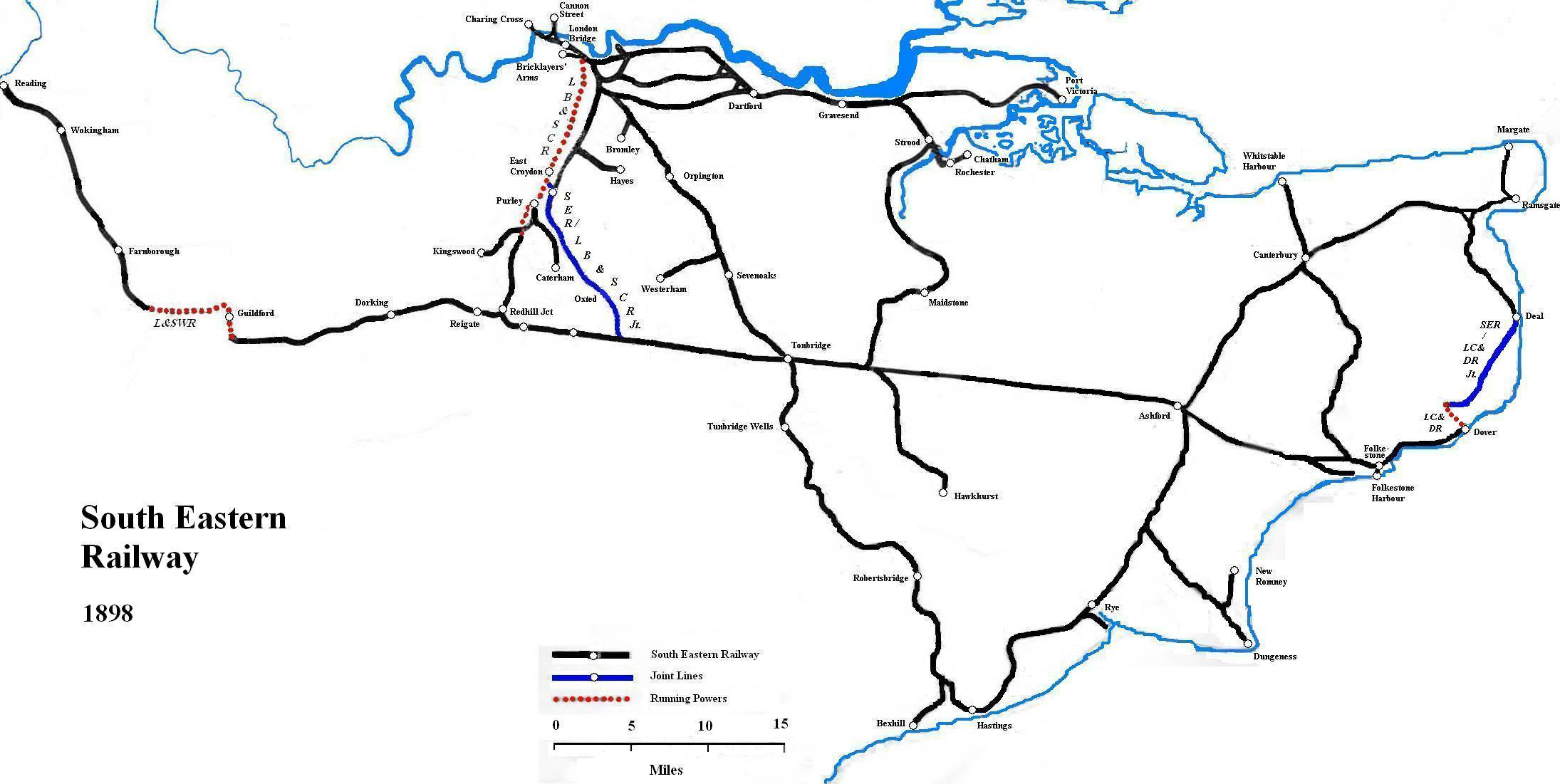
A sketch map of the SER at the time of the creation of the SE&CR

During the early 1890s competition between the SER and the LCDR reached ruinous proportions with both companies offering nearly identical services to and from the same towns, which inevitably lost money for both companies. However, following the resignation of Watkin in 1894, relations between the two companies gradually improved under his successors Sir George Russell (1895) and, most notably, under Cosmo Bonsor (1897). Bonsor managed to persuade the two boards of governors to see sense and from 1 January 1899 the South Eastern and Chatham Railways Joint Management Committee was formed to oversee joint working, with Bonsor as its chairman. On 5 August 1899 the South Eastern and London, Chatham and Dover Railways Act 1899 (62 & 63 Vict. c. clxviii) was passed, which resulted in the formation of the South Eastern and Chatham Railway (SE&CR). This was not a true merger since each company kept its individual board of directors within the organisation.

The quality of service of the SE&CR and the level of public estimation of its two constituent railways increased considerably during the next thirty-five years. The SER was however abolished on 1 January 1923 under the terms of the Railways Act 1921.

== Train services ==
Throughout its independent existence, the SER was primarily a passenger rather than a freight railway, with passenger receipts accounting for more than 72% of its revenues.

=== Freight services ===
Prior to 1862 the company carried international postal traffic. However, in 1862 they refused to renew the contract as it stipulated the Dover-Calais rather than the SER's preferred Folkestone-Boulogne route. As a result, the contract went to the LCDR.

It was not until after the formation of the SE&CR management committee in 1899 that the company began to take the development of its freight traffic seriously, with the ordering of a powerful new freight SECR C class. Prior to that most freight on the system had either been products imported through the Channel ports, or else locally developed freight, such as farm produce travelling to London. The principal freight depot on the system was at Bricklayers Arms.

The cement industry based at Swanscombe centred on Swanscombe Cement Works, together with that of the Medway Towns, provided some minerals traffic, but again it was only after the foundation of Blue Circle Industries in 1900 that this was developed. Similarly, the Kent coalfield was not discovered until 1890 and only developed in the early twentieth century.

=== Passenger services ===
As mentioned above, the SER was accused during the 1880s of concentrating on its Boat trains and Continental passenger traffic at the expense of its local services in Kent and the London suburbs.

==== London suburban services ====
One area where the SER did fail compared with the LBSCR and the L&SWR was in developing effective services to the rapidly growing suburbs of south east London. This was probably due to an unwillingness to generate even more traffic through the very restricted entry pathway into London between Deptford and London Bridge. The SER did however have the advantage of taking commuters far closer to the centres of business and commerce at Charing Cross and Cannon Street, whereas the LBSCR and LS&WR deposited them south of the river Thames at London Bridge and Waterloo respectively.

==== Holiday traffic ====
The SER served an area with a long coastline within easy travelling distance of London. During the 1860s the railway was an important factor in the development of holiday destinations such as Margate and Ramsgate in Kent and St Leonards-on-Sea and Hastings in East Sussex.

==== Continental excursions ====
In May 1844 the SER organised the first of seven rail and ferry excursions that year from London to Boulogne which together carried more than 2,000 people.

==== Hop picking ====
By the 1870s, the South Eastern Railway was running Hop Pickers' Specials to transport large numbers of working-class Londoners to towns and villages in Kent and East Sussex for the season.

== Communications, signalling and accidents ==
=== Electric telegraph ===
Electric telegraph was installed throughout the SER by 1848. These were sold to the General Post Office for £200,000 in 1870 (equivalent to £20,580,000 in 2025).

=== Signals and signal boxes ===
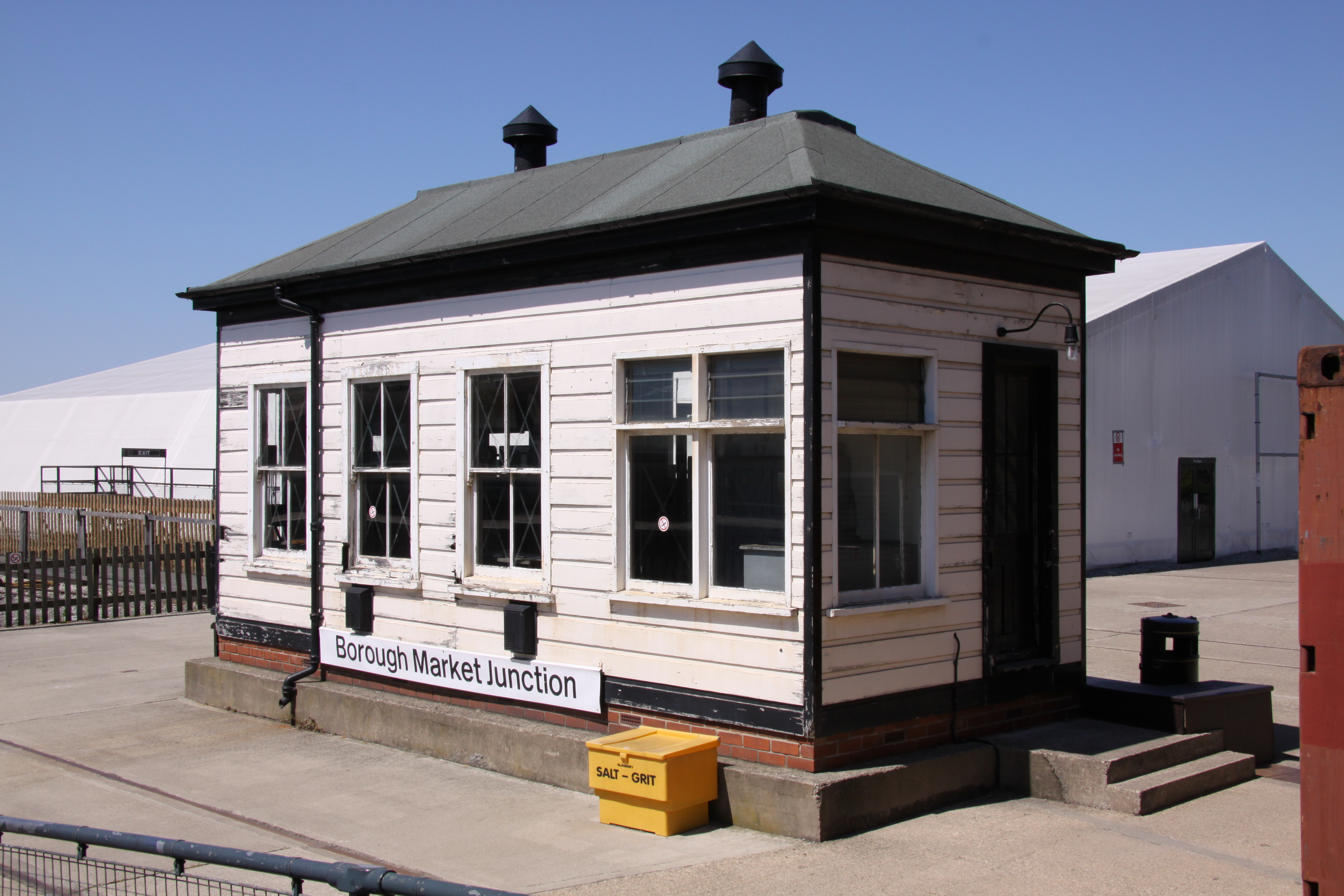
Borough Market Junction signal box, a South Eastern Railway Type design on display outside the station hall at the National Railway Museum, York.

=== Accidents ===
The SER did not have a good safety record with a large number of both major and minor accidents throughout its independent existence.

One of the most notable accidents occurred on 9 June 1865, when the boat train from Folkestone ran onto a partly dismantled bridge near Staplehurst. The locomotive and tender ran across the timber baulks to reach the far side, but the carriages were derailed and fell into the River Beult. The Staplehurst rail crash killed ten passengers and Charles Dickens narrowly avoided severe injury, or even death. He was travelling with Nelly Ternan and her mother at the front of the train in a first-class carriage, which escaped complete derailment when the locomotive and tender left the track as a result of repairs to the line. Timber baulks under the track were being replaced but the foreman mis-read the timetable, and two lengths of rail were missing on the viaduct. As the lead vehicles left the line, the impact on the remaining beams caused the cast iron girders below to fracture, and most of the following vehicles left the viaduct and ended up in the River Beult some 15 feet (4.6 m) below. The foreman was indicted and convicted of manslaughter, and served six months hard labour for his crime.

Other significant accidents involving multiple fatalities were as follows:

- 11 December 1844 the boiler explosion of locomotive No. 78 Forrester caused a bridge collapse near Bricklayers Arms, Surrey and killed two staff.
- 21 August 1854 a collision at East Croydon railway station killed three passengers. This accident also involved the LBSCR signalman and was later judged to be partly the result of signalling error and poor communication, as well as the SER driver.
- 12 September 1855 – a collision between two trains near Reading station killed five.
- 28 June 1857 – the Lewisham rail crash killed 11 people. An express train ran into the rear of a stationary train due to driver error.
- 30 June 1858 – a derailment near Chilham railway station due to a mechanical failure killed three persons.
- 16 December 1864 – a collision near Blackheath. A ballast train had divided in a tunnel, and an express passenger train was allowed to enter due to an error by a signalman. Five platelayers were killed.
- January 1877 – a landslip at the eastern end of Martello Tunnel brought down some 60,000 cubic yards (46,000 m^{3}) of chalk, killing three men. The line was closed for two months.
- 7 June 1884 – A double-headed freight train ran into the rear of another freight train at Tub's Hill station, Sevenoaks. Both crew of the first train were killed. the Hildenborough signalman was charged with causing their deaths. The trains were being worked under the time interval system.
- 9 October 1894 – a collision near Chartham due to an error by a crossing keeper killed seven.
- 21 March 1898 – Collision at St Johns railway station due to incorrect use of signalling equipment, three persons were killed.

== Rolling stock ==
Between March 1842, shortly before the SER began to run its services, and March 1844, the rolling stock of the railway was pooled with that of its neighbour and operated by the 'London & Croydon and South Eastern Railways Joint Committee'. The locomotives were then under the supervision of Benjamin Cubitt at New Cross Depot. In the latter month the pool was also joined by the L&BR. However all three railways felt themselves disadvantaged by the arrangement and in October 1844 the SER gave notice six months notice of withdrawal, which was later extended until 31 January 1846. The existing locomotives and carriages, and those on order, were divided between the three companies.

=== Steam locomotives ===
The SER owned fifteen locomotives and had a further eleven on order at the formation of the 'London & Croydon and South Eastern Railways Joint Committee' in 1842. Ten locomotives were built by this committee, and a further 45 were either built or ordered by the enlarged Brighton, Croydon and Dover Joint Committee. The SER received 67 of these existing locomotives at the dissolution of the latter committee in 1846. Having decided to withdraw from the locomotive pool, the SER appointed James Cudworth as Locomotive Superintendent on 22 May 1845. Four locomotives were acquired from the 'Gravesend and Rochester Railway in 1847, seven from the L&GR in 1848, but the only original locomotive to work the Canterbury and Whitstable Railway was not added to stock. Between 1846 and 1898 the SER built or purchased 775 locomotives. Of these, 459 were running on 31 December 1898 when they were handed over to the SE&CR.

Under Cudworth the railway was the largest British user of the experimental and ultimately unsuccessful Crampton locomotive type with twenty examples built between 1847 and 1851. He also patented a double-firebox which enabled locomotives to burn cheaper coal without smoke, but were considerably more expensive to build and maintain. Cudworth also provided several sound locomotive types for the railway, but resigned in 1876 after Sir Edward Watkin ordered 20 express locomotives against Cudworth's wishes, which subsequently proved to have been unsuccessful.

After a brief interregnum James Stirling was appointed Chief Mechanical Engineer on 28 March 1878. He modernised the locomotive stock and was responsible for the building or acquisition of 401 locomotives. Stirling designed some good quality locomotive classes, notably his R 0-6-0, and Q 0-4-4 tank classes, and his O 0-6-0 and F 4-4-0 tender classes. However his determination to maintain standardisation meant that the introduction of larger locomotives was delayed too long and the SER locomotive fleet was underpowered by 1899. As a result, future SE&CR locomotive practice was based on developing LCDR rather than SER designs.

== Locomotive superintendents ==
- – 1845 – Benjamin Cubitt
- 1845 – 1876 James I'Anson Cudworth
- 1876 – Alfred Mellor Watkin
- 1876 – 1878 Richard Mansell
- 1878 – 1898 James Stirling

== Ships ==
The South Eastern Railway operated a number of ships from Folkestone and Dover to Boulogne, France and Ostend, Belgium. In 1853 the SER took over the South Eastern and Continental Steam Packet Company.

Ship	Launched	Tonnage (GRT)	Notes
Albert Edward	1862	365	Wrecked in 1893 at Cap Gris Nez.
Albert Victor	1880	814	Scrapped 1899.
Alexandra	1864	203	Sold in 1899 to Scott, Calcutta, India.
Boulogne	1878	407	Sold in 1903 to British Central Africa Co Ltd.
Duchess of Edinburgh	1880	812	Sold in 1882 to Barrow Steam Navigation Co Ltd, renamed Manx Queen.
Duchess of York	1895	996	Scrapped in 1904
Eugenie	1862	426	Sold in 1863, became Confederate blockade runner Cornubia.
Folkestone	1878	398	Scrapped in 1903.
Lord Warden	1847	308	Acquired in 1854, scrapped in 1881.
Louise Dagmar	1880	818	Scrapped in 1899.
Mary Beatrice	1882	803	Scrapped in 1900
Napoleon III	1865	345	Scrapped in 1890.
Prince Ernest	1845	248	Scrapped in 1886
Princess Clementine	1846	288	Acquired in 1854, scrapped in 1884.
Princess Helena	1847	302	Acquired in 1854, scrapped in 1881.
Princess Mary	1844	192	Sold in 1874 to Wilhelms, London.
Princess Maud	1844	187	Acquired in 1854, scrapped in 1886.
Princess of Wales	1898	1,009	Sold in 1910 to Argentina, renamed Rio Uruguay.
Queen of the Belgians	1844	206	Acquired in 1854, scrapped in 1881.
Queen of the French	1845	215	Sold in 1863 to a Belgian owner, renamed Saphir.
Victoria	1861	359	Scrapped in 1895.

== See also ==
- Edward Chapman
- Joshua Fielden
- Rail transport in Great Britain

== Sources ==
- Acworth, William (1895). The South Eastern Railway: its passenger services, rolling stock, locomotives, gradients, and express speeds. Cassell & Co.
- Ahrons, E.L. (1953). Locomotive and train working in the latter part of the nineteenth century. Cambridge: Heffer.
- Board of Trade (1845). The Board of Trade and the Kentish railway schemes. Board of Trade.
- Body, Geoffrey (1984). Railways of the Southern Region. Patrick Stephens Ltd.
- Bradley, D.L. (1963). The Locomotives of the South Eastern Railway. Railway Correspondence and Travel Society.
- Bradley, D.L. (1969). The Locomotives of the London Brighton and South Coast Railway. Part I. Railway Correspondence and Travel Society.
- Bradley, D.L. (1979). The Locomotives of the London Chatham and Dover Railway. Railway Correspondence and Travel Society.
- Bradshaw, George & Co. (1867). Bradshaw's Railway Manual, Shareholder's Guide, and Official Directory for 1867. W.J. Adams.
- Eborall, C.W.; Smiles, Samuel (1863). Report of the General Manager and Secretary of the relations of the South Eastern and Brighton Companies. McCorqudale & Co for the South Eastern Railway.
- Foxwell, Ernest (September 1883). "English Express Trains: Their Average Speed, &c., with Notes on Gradients, Long Runs, &c". Journal of the Statistical Society of London. 46 (3): 517–574.
- Gray, Adrian (1985). The London, Chatham & Dover Railway. Meresborough Books.
- Gray, Adrian (1990). The South Eastern Railway. Middleton Press. ISBN 978-0-906520-85-7.
- Gray, Adrian (1995). The South Eastern & Chatham Railways. Middleton Press. ISBN 978-1-901706-08-6.
- Greaves, John Neville (2008). Sir Edward Watkin, 1819-1901. The Book Guild Ltd. ISBN 978-1-85776-888-6.
- Heap, Christine; van Riemdijk, John (1980). Pre-grouping railways. Part 2. H.M.S.O.
- Hewison, Christian H. (1983). Locomotive Boiler Explosions. Newton Abbot: David & Charles. ISBN 0-7153-8305-1.
- Hoole, Ken (1982). Trains in Trouble: Vol. 3. Redruth: Atlantic Books. ISBN 0-906899-05-2.
- Jewell, Brian (1984). Down the line to Hastings. Southborough: The Baton Press. ISBN 0-85936-223-X.
- Kidner, R.W. (1953). The South Eastern Railway and the S.E.C.R. South Godstone: The Oakwood Press.
- London Brighton & South Coast Railway (1867). Report of the Committee of Investigation. London Brighton and South Coast Railway.
- McRae, Burnham S.G., C.P.; et al. (1973). The Rural Landscape of Kent. Wye College. ISBN 0-900947-37-3.
- Dendy Marshall, C.F. (1963). History of the Southern Railway: v.1. Ian Allan Ltd.
- Marshall, John (1978). A Biographical Dictionary of Railway Engineers. Newton Abbot: David and Charles Ltd. ISBN 0-7153-7489-3.
- George S. Measom (1853), Official Illustrated Guide to the South-Eastern Railway, London: W.H. Smith and Son, OCLC 25963337
- Nock, O.S. (1961). The South Eastern and Chatham Railway. Ian Allan Ltd.
- The Railway Year Book for 1912. The Railway Publishing Company Ltd. 1912.
- Sekon, G.A. (1895). History of the South Eastern Railway. London: Railway Press Co. Ltd.
- Smiles, Samuel (1905). The autobiography of Samuel Smiles, LL. D. New York: E.P.Dutton & Co.
- South-Eastern Railway Company (1847). Statement of the projects of the South-Eastern Railway Company before Parliament, session 1847. South Eastern Railway.
- Turner, J.T. Howard (1977). The London Brighton and South Coast Railway: 1 Origins and formation. London: Batsford.
- Turner, J.T. Howard (1978). The London Brighton and South Coast Railway: 2 Establishment and growth. London: Batsford.
- White, H.P. (1961). A regional history of the railways of southern England: Vol. II. London: Phoenix House.
