= Dungeness nuclear power stations =

Decommissioned nuclear power plants in England

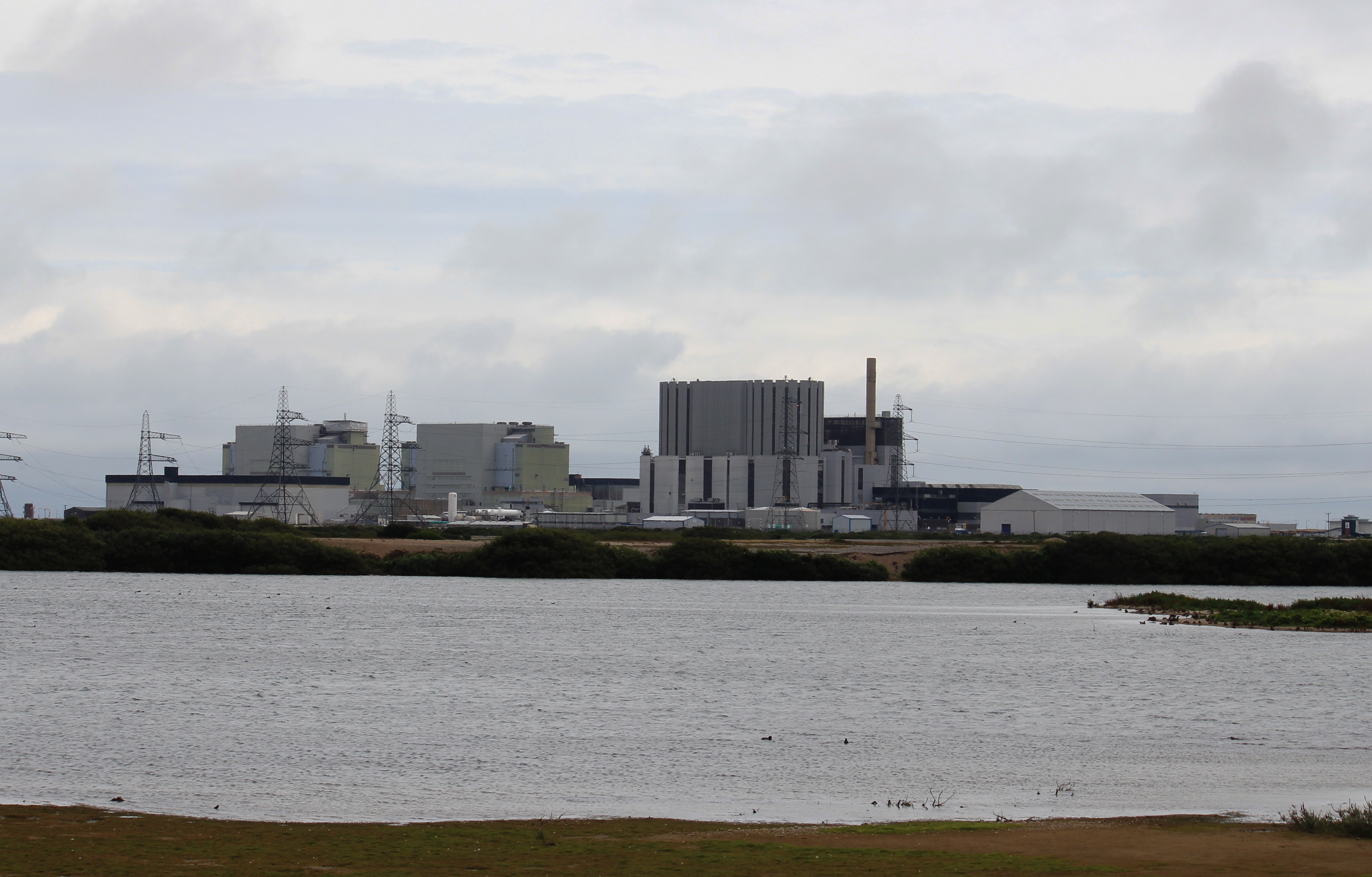
Dungeness A & B nuclear power stations

The Dungeness nuclear power stations are a pair of non-operational nuclear power stations located on the Dungeness headland in the south of Kent, England.

Dungeness A is a legacy Magnox power station consisting of two 250 MWe reactors which were connected to the National Grid in 1965 and reached its end of life in 2006. Its decommissioning is being managed by Nuclear Restoration Services.

Dungeness B is an advanced gas-cooled reactor (AGR) power station consisting of two 520 MWe reactors, which began operation in 1983 and 1985. They were the first in a series of AGR reactors to be constructed across the UK. In March 2009, unexpected problems discovered during a maintenance shutdown on unit B21 resulted in the reactor remaining offline for nearly 18 months. In 2015, the plant received upgrades and was given a second ten-year life extension to 2028. In September 2018, as both units were shut down for a scheduled maintenance outage, EDF encountered "significant and ongoing technical challenges" which ultimately led to the announcement of its closure on 7 June 2021.

== Dungeness A ==
Dungeness A Nuclear Power Station
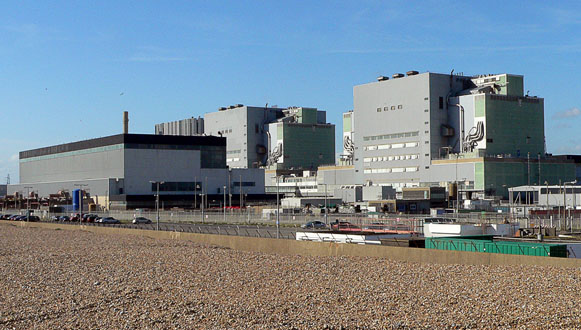
- Dungeness A
- Country: England
- Location: Kent, South East England
- Coordinates: 50.9132°N 0.9641°E
- Status: Decommissioning in progress
- Commission date: 1965
- Decommission date: 2006
- Owner: Nuclear Decommissioning Authority
- Operator: Nuclear Restoration Services

Nuclear power station
- Reactor type: Magnox
- Reactor supplier: The Nuclear Power Group

Thermal power station
- Primary fuel: Nuclear
- Cooling source: Sea water

Power generation
- Units operational: 4 × 142.5 MW
- Units decommissioned: 2 × 219 MWe net
- Nameplate capacity: 500 MWe
- Annual net output: See graph in text

External links
- Website: www.magnoxsites.co.uk/site/dungeness-a/
- Commons: Related media on Commons

Dungeness A is a legacy Magnox power station that was connected to the National Grid in 1965 and has reached the end of its life. It possessed two nuclear reactors producing 219 MW of electricity each, with a total capacity of 438 MW. The construction was undertaken by a consortium known as the Nuclear Power Group ('TNPG'). The reactors were supplied by TNPG and the turbines by C. A. Parsons & Co. There were originally four × 142.5 MW turbo-alternators, these were later down-rated to 106 MW machines. Steam pressure and temperature at the turbine stop valves was 535 psi (36.9 bar) and 391 °C (736 °F).

=== Electricity output ===
Electricity output from Dungeness A power station over the period 1966-84 was as follows.

Nuclear fuel for Dungeness power stations can be delivered and removed via a crane loading facility at the end of the 9-mile (14 km) Appledore-Lydd-Dungeness branch railway. This is connected to the Ashford to Hastings line via an east-facing junction located to the west of Appledore station. The close proximity of the Appledore-Lydd-Dungeness branch to the nuclear power stations allow for a more direct route to and from major fuel fabrication sites all whilst minimising the use of road convoys thus lowering traffic impact on nearby communities.

=== Closure and decommissioning ===
On 31 December 2006, Dungeness A ceased power generation after over 40 years of operation. Defuelling was completed in June 2012, with all fuel having been sent to Sellafield for reprocessing. After the site was declared fuel-free, demolition works accelerated beginning with the demolition of the turbine hall in June 2015. Similar to other legacy Magnox stations, the site will undergo decommissioning where radiologically contaminated equipment is removed and redundant structures demolished. Once complete, the reactor buildings will be re-cladded to ensure they are able to remain an effective barrier to the elements and the facility will enter a 'care and maintenance' stage.

The care and maintenance stage is part of the Nuclear Decommissioning Authority (NDA) decommissioning strategy and spans an 80+ year period. This waiting period allows for radiation levels within the reactor core to decline and helps to facilitate a smoother demolition process. Dungeness A is due to enter the care and maintenance phase in 2027. Demolition of reactor buildings and final site clearance is planned for 2088 to 2098. The ongoing decommissioning process is being managed by Nuclear Restoration Services, formerly Magnox Ltd, a subsidiary of the NDA.

== Dungeness B ==
Dungeness B Nuclear Power Station
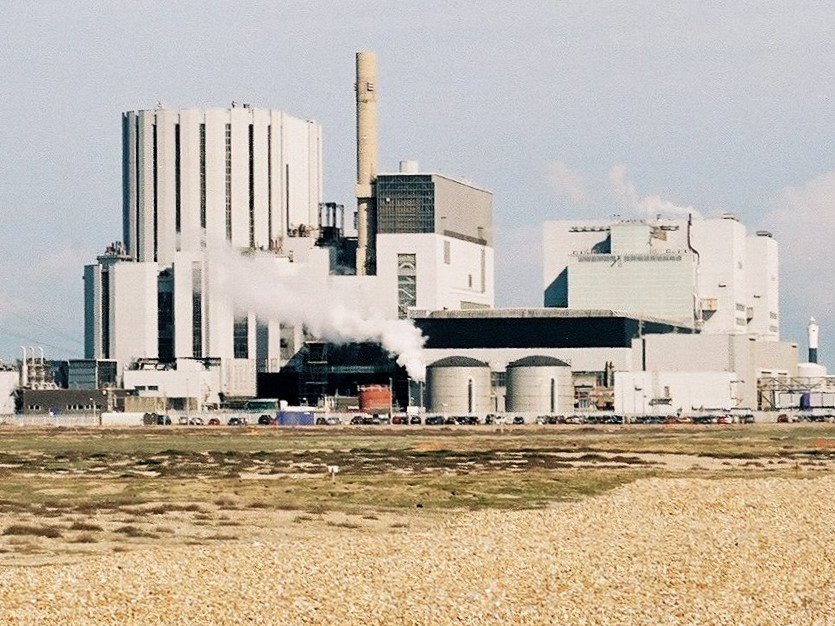
- Dungeness B
- Country: England
- Location: Kent, South East England
- Coordinates: 50.9138°N 0.9599°E
- Status: Defuelling
- Construction began: 1965
- Commission date: 1983
- Decommission date: 2021
- Operator: EDF Energy

Nuclear power station
- Reactor type: AGR
- Reactor supplier: Fairey Engineering Ltd

Thermal power station
- Primary fuel: Nuclear
- Thermal capacity: 2 x 1496 MWt

Power generation
- Units operational: 2 x 660 MWe (Operating at ≈545 MWe net )
- Nameplate capacity: 1,320 MWe

External links
- Website: www.edfenergy.com/energy/power-stations/dungeness-b
- Commons: Related media on Commons

Dungeness B is an advanced gas-cooled reactor (AGR) power station consisting of two 1,496 MWt reactors, which began operation in 1983 and 1985 respectively. Dungeness B was the first commercial scale AGR power station to be constructed. Its design was based on the much smaller Windscale AGR prototype. The £89 million contract was awarded in August 1965 to Atomic Power Construction ('APC'), a consortium backed by Crompton Parkinson, Fairey Engineering, International Combustion and Richardsons Westgarth. The completion date was set as 1970.

During construction, many problems were encountered in scaling up the WAGR design. Problems with the construction of the pressure vessel liner had distorted it, so that the boilers, which were to fit in an annular space between the reactor and the pressure vessel, could not be installed, and the liner had to be partially dismantled and rebuilt. This work cost about £200,000, but there was a huge cost of financing an extra 18 unproductive months for a power station costing around £100 million, of which 60% was already complete. Serious problems were also discovered with the design of the boilers, which had to withstand the pounding of hot carbon dioxide (CO_{2}), pressurised to 600 pounds per square inch (4,100 kPa) and pumped around the reactor coolant circuit by massive gas circulators. As a consequence, the casings, hangers and tube supports all had to be redesigned. The cost of the modifications, and financing during the delays, caused severe financial pressures for the consortium and its backers, and in 1969 APC collapsed into administration.

The CEGB took over project management, imposed light penalties in order not to cripple Fairey and International Combustion, and appointed British Nuclear Design and Construction (BNDC) as main contractor. In 1971, problems with corrosion of mild steel components in the first generation Magnox reactors gave the designers cause for concern. The Dungeness B restraint couplings - mechanical linkages that held the graphite core in place whilst allowing it to expand and contract in response to temperature changes - were made of mild steel and could be subject to the same corrosion. It was decided to replace them with components made from a new material. In 1972, problems were found with the galvanised wire that was used to attach thermocouples to stainless steel boiler tubes. During heat treatment of the tubes at temperatures up to 1,050 °C (1,920 °F), the galvanising zinc diffused into the tubes and made them brittle. The cost had by then risen to £170 million. By 1975, the CEGB was reporting that the power station would not be completed until 1977 and that its cost had risen to £280 million. By 1979, the cost had risen further to £410 million.

Reactor 1 first generated power on 3 April 1983, 13 years behind schedule and at a cost of £685 million, four times the initial estimate in inflation-adjusted terms. The original construction consortium had collapsed.

As with the "A" station, the turbines were built by C.A. Parsons & Company and the station has two 660 MWe turbo-alternator sets, producing a maximum output of 1,320 MWe, though net output is 1,090 MWe after the effects of house load, and downrating the reactor output due to corrosion and vibration concerns.

In 2005, the station's closure date was extended from 2008 by ten years, which would allow it to continue operating until 2018, 35 years after first power generation.

In March 2009, serious problems were found when Unit 21 was shut down for maintenance, and the reactor remained out of action for almost 18 months. On 24 November 2009, a small fire in the boiler annexe of Unit 22 caused the second reactor to be shut down as well. Subsequently, Unit 22 has been intermittently shut down for up to several months at a time. Unit 21 was restarted in August 2010. Unplanned shutdowns continued into 2011, with 21 down for repairs from November 2011 to March 2012.

In 2015, the plant was given another ten-year life extension, allowing an upgrade to control room computer systems and improved flood defences, taking the accounting closure date to 2028.

=== Electricity output ===
In 2015, Dungeness B produced 4.4 TWh of energy. The operators claimed that this amounted to a saving of 3.4 million tonnes of CO_{2}.

=== Decommissioning ===
In September 2018, the Office for Nuclear Regulation (ONR) directed that EDF Energy carry out a reassessment of corrosion of safety-related concealed systems. Inspections showed that seismic restraints, pipework and storage vessels were found to be "corroded to an unacceptable condition", and that would have been the state when the reactor was operating. Remedial measures included the upgrading of more than 300 metres (980 ft) of pipeline and of carbon dioxide storage vessels. The ONR classified this as a level 2 incident on the International Nuclear Event Scale. Dungeness B was initially expected to return to service in February 2019, later put back to 30 September 2019 to complete inspections. In August 2020, the shut down of units B21 and B22 was extended to December 2020 after being taken offline in September 2018.

On 7 June 2021, EDF announced that Dungeness B would not be restarted and would move into the defuelling phase immediately, once regulatory permissions are granted, citing "station-specific risks within some key components, including parts within the fuel assemblies" identified since September 2018.

EDF has estimated the cost of defuelling Dungeness B at £0.5–£1.0 billion, with the process expected to take up to ten years. A UK Parliament committee report noted that the cost of decommissioning is shouldered in part by UK taxpayers.

== Consideration of Dungeness C ==
On 15 April 2009, Dungeness was included in a list of 11 potential sites for new nuclear power stations, at the request of EDF Energy, which owns and operates Dungeness B. The government did not include Dungeness C in its draft National Policy Statement published on 9 November 2009, citing environmental reasons and concerns about coastal erosion and associated flood risk. The site was ruled out by Secretary of State for Energy and Climate Change Chris Huhne in October 2010, with the former government's list of eleven potential sites reduced to eight. Despite these environmental concerns, local Conservative MP Damian Collins, supported by some residents, lobbied Parliament to reconsider that position.

== HVDC station ==
From 1961 to 1984, Dungeness power station also housed the mercury arc valves of the static inverter plant converting AC into DC for transmission on HVDC Cross-Channel, the high-voltage direct current power cable carrying electric power across the English Channel to France. In 1983, a more powerful new inverter at Sellindge replaced this facility.

== Ownership ==
Both stations were originally built, owned, and operated by the CEGB. Following privatisation of the electricity supply industry and the later part-privatisation of the nuclear power generating industry they are now owned by two different bodies: the original Magnox station Dungeness A by the non-departmental government body the NDA and newer AGR Dungeness B by EDF Energy.

== Location ==
The stations are built on a large area of open shingle, measuring 12 by 6 kilometres (7.5 by 3.7 mi), which has been deposited by the sea and built up over thousands of years. The entire area is moving slowly north and east as the sea moves the shingle from one side of the headland to the other. It is surrounded by a nature reserve Site of Special Scientific Interest (SSSI). A fleet of lorries is used to continuously maintain shingle sea defences for the plant as coastal erosion would otherwise move shingle away at an estimated rate of 6 metres (20 ft) per year. Around 30,000 cubic metres (39,000 cu yd) of shingle are moved each year. It seems that deposition on the north shore of the headland does not keep pace with erosion, although the power stations are about 1 kilometre (0.62 mi) to the west of that shore. In all, 90,000 cubic metres (120,000 cu yd) are moved each year along parts of the coast between Pett Level and Hythe. This is necessary for the safety of the entire area including the power stations. During operation, around 100 million litres (22×10^{6} imp gal) of cooling water was extracted and returned to the sea each hour, after being heated by 12 °C (22 °F).

The headland and the coastline between Pett Level and Hythe are volatile. In recorded history Walland Marsh to the west of the power stations has been flooded. In the space of sixty years severe inundation occurred, temporarily bringing the sea inland to Appledore and the original mouth of the River Rother from north of the headland at Romney to the south at Rye Harbour. The site is a few metres above Mean Sea Level and would be isolated in the event of flooding of the magnitude that submerged large areas of East Anglia and the Netherlands in 1953. It has been conjectured that the Great Storm of 1987 did not bring the sea to the stations because there was a low tide at the time. Climate change could cause more frequent and powerful storms, and associated waves and surges are possible though not probable, and might increase the instability of the headland.

=== In the media ===
The station was used in the filming of the Doctor Who serial The Claws of Axos in January 1971.

The site provides a key plot point in the 2016 book, Alan Partridge: Nomad.

The station is within sight of artist Derek Jarman's garden at Prospect Cottage. The film The Garden was filmed at the house, and it was the main subject of an episode of BBC's Countryfile in February 2020.

Dungeness B appears on the album sleeve for the 1980 album Sound Affects by The Jam.

== See also ==
- Nuclear power in the United Kingdom
- Energy policy of the United Kingdom
- Energy use and conservation in the United Kingdom

== Other sources ==
1. Eddison, J (2000). Romney Marsh Survival on a Frontier. Tempus. ISBN 0-7524-1486-0. Page 139 also reports the 1990 flooding mentioned above. Page 139 also reports the 1990 flooding mentioned above.
2. "Romney Marsh".
3. "Kent Against a Radioactive Environment". Archived from the original on 24 April 2006.
4. "British Energy". Archived from the original on 28 September 2007.
5. "industcards".
6. "Going Critical" (PDF).
