= Appledore railway station =

Railway station in Kent, England

Appledore (Kent)
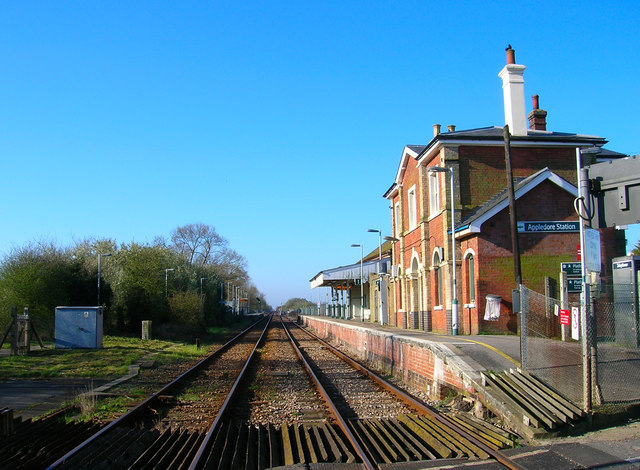

General information
- Location: Appledore, Ashford, England
- Coordinates: 51.0330°N 0.8164°E
- Grid reference: TQ975297
- Manager: Southern
- Platforms: 2

Other information
- Station code: APD
- Classification: DfT category F2

History
- Opened: 13 February 1851

Passengers
- 2021/22: ▲24,818
- 2022/23: ▲26,478
- 2023/24: ▲28,764
- 2024/25: ▲29,092
- 2025/26: ▲31,520

Listed Building – Grade II
- Feature: Railway station
- Designated: 2 July 2001
- Reference no.: 1245943
Location
Notes
- Passenger statistics from the Office of Rail and Road

Appledore railway station serves the village of Appledore, in Kent, England. It is a Grade II listed station on the Marshlink line; services are provided by Southern.

The station was constructed in 1851 by the South Eastern Railway and designed by William Tress. It became a junction station in 1881 when a branch line opened to Lydd and New Romney; this closed to passengers in 1967, following implementation of the Beeching Report, though the line remains open for goods traffic to Dungeness nuclear power station. Despite a recommendation in the report that Appledore should also close, it remained open.

== Name ==
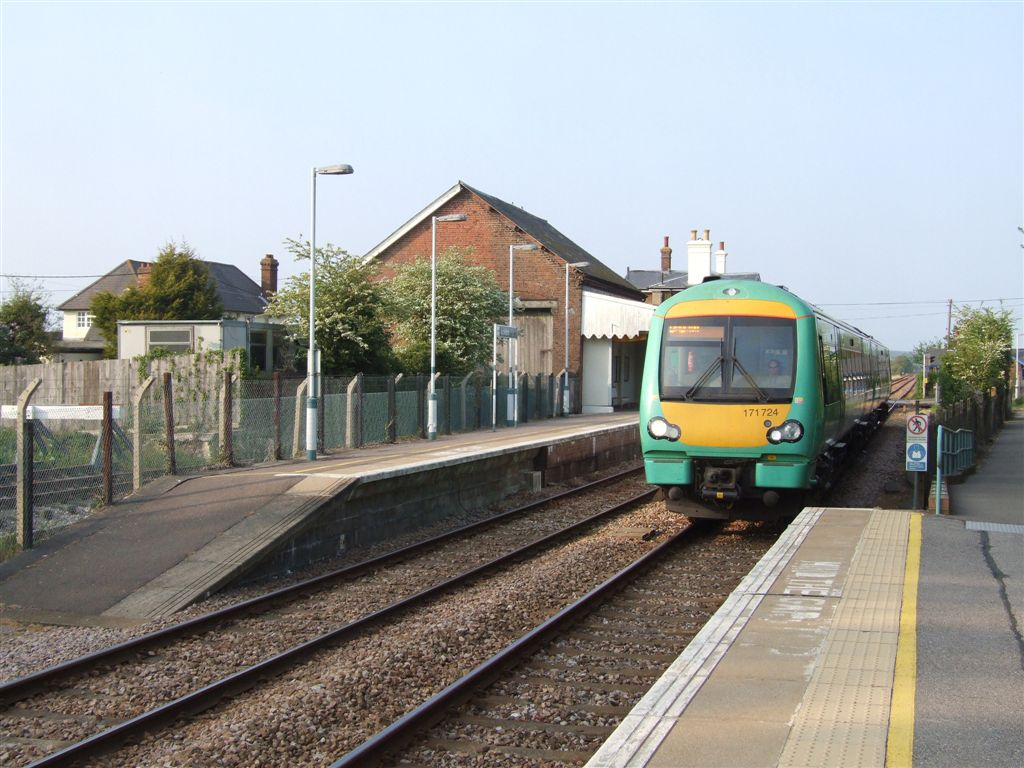
A train stopping at Appledore, showing the staggered platforms

According to National Rail, this station's official name is Appledore (Kent), despite the other Appledore station in Devon having closed in 1917. On official documents and railway company websites, the station is referred to as Appledore (Kent), although signs at the station simply list Appledore.

== History ==
The station was first proposed by the South Eastern Railway (SER) in June 1848 as a stop on the Ashford to Hastings line. That September, hop planters near Appledore petitioned the early construction of the line to help with harvest; however, a formal decision to build a station was not taken until June 1850.

The station was designed, along with others along the line, by William Tress. The main building was built in an Italianate style with red brick with a Welsh slate roof. It opened, along with the rest of the line on 13 February 1851. A pub, the Man of Kent Railway Tavern, was built in 1853 on the opposite side of the road (now the B2080). It was rebuilt adjacent to the station in the late 19th century. A waiting room was built in 1894, followed by a goods shed in 1896 and a station master's house in the following year.

In 1881, Appledore was upgraded to become a junction station to cater for a branch line to Lydd Town, with new signals installed. The branch line opened on 7 December and was further extended to New Romney in 1884. The station platforms were widened in June 1887 to accommodate longer trains. A line was also proposed from Appledore to Tenterden, but this was never built.

The SER subsequently merged with the London, Chatham and Dover Railway to form the South Eastern and Chatham Railway. It became part of the Southern Railway during the Grouping of 1923. The station then passed on to the Southern Region of British Railways on nationalisation in 1948.

The goods shed was closed in 1963. Appledore ceased to be a junction station for passengers when the branch line to Lydd and New Romney closed in 1967; however, it continued to be used for goods traffic to Dungeness.

When sectorisation was introduced in the 1980s, the station was served by Network SouthEast until the privatisation of British Rail.

In 2001, the station building and goods shed were Grade II listed. The main building is in good condition and has been largely unaltered since its original 1851 construction.

APTIS was once provided here until the booking office closed in the very early 1990s, leaving no ticketing facilities. In 2016, Southern installed a new self-service ticket machine. The office buildings on the Ashford-bound platform are unused.

=== Accidents and incidents ===
- On 14 March 1980, an empty stock train comprising five Hastings unit vehicles derailed due to excessive speed through a set of points. The driver was killed and a motor coach was consequently withdrawn from service due to extensive damage.
- On 31 July 1989, 2H diesel-electric multiple unit 205 101 collided with a van on the level crossing.

== Location ==
The station is located almost 2 miles (3.2 km) from Appledore village and 8 1/2 miles (13.7 km) south of Ashford International, on the B2080. Owing to its distance from the village, it lies in the parish of Kenardington.

Appledore is just north of a junction of a freight branch line running to Dungeness nuclear power station, via Lydd Town. It is also the start of the single track section of the Marshlink line, which runs through to Ore, near Hastings, with a passing loop at Rye. Along with several other stations on the line, the platforms are staggered.

When British Rail introduced widespread provision of enamel totem station signs, Appledore was one of very few that had some wooden ones fitted.

== Services ==
All services at Appledore are operated by Southern, using Class 171 diesel multiple units.

The typical off-peak service in trains per hour (tph) is:

- 1 tph to Eastbourne, via Hastings
- 1 tph to Ashford International.

Previously, westbound trains ran as an express service to Brighton, although this was changed to a stopping service to Eastbourne in the May 2018 timetable change.

Preceding station	National Rail	Following station
Rye	Southern Marshlink Line	Ham Street
	Disused railways	
Terminus	British Rail Southern Region Dungeness Branch Line	Brookland Halt Line open, station closed
