= Church of St Thomas of Canterbury and English Martyrs, St Leonards-on-Sea =

Church in East Sussex, England

Church of St Thomas of Canterbury and English Martyrs
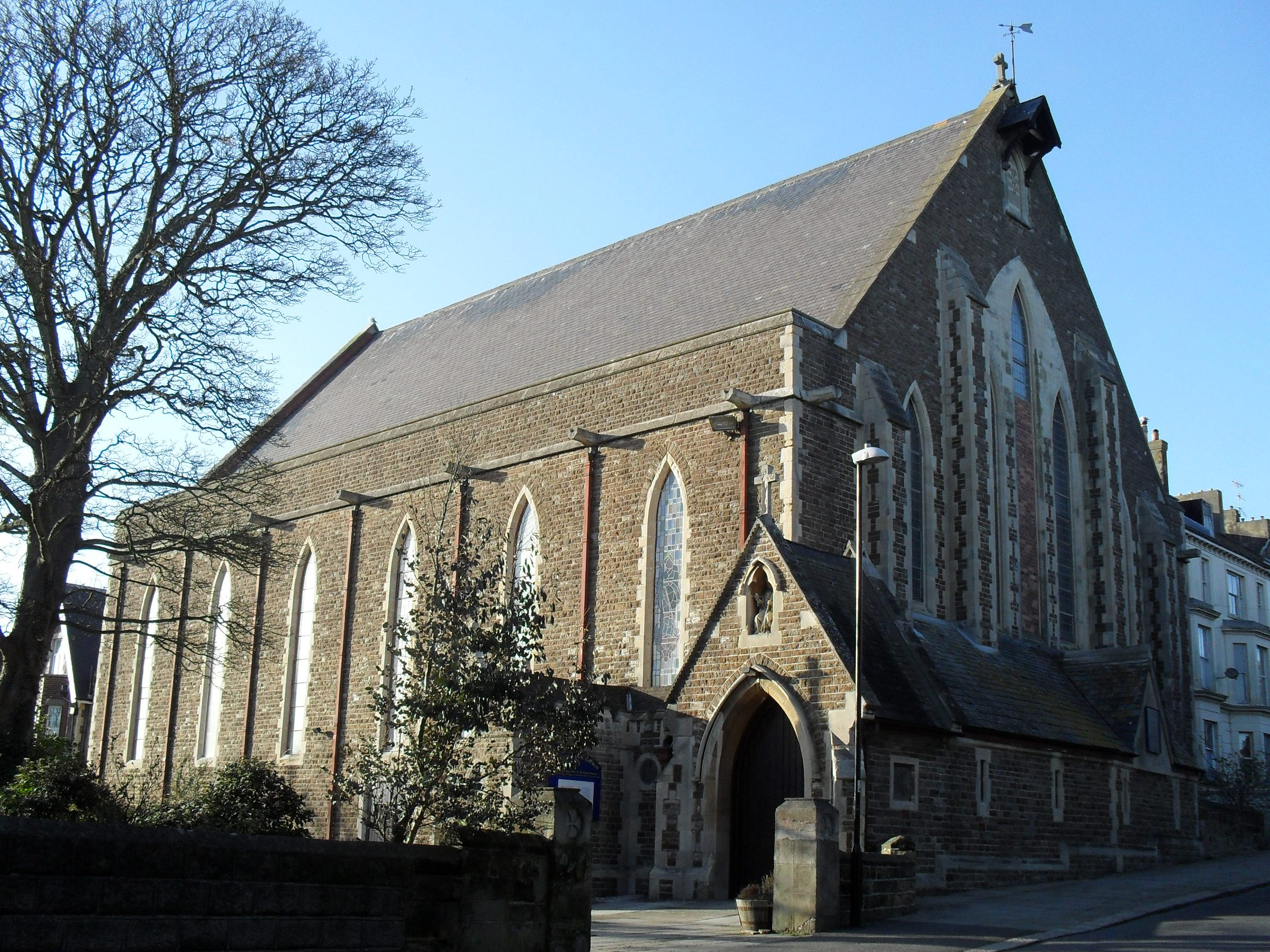
- The church from the southeast
- Church of St Thomas of Canterbury and English Martyrs
- 50.8565°N 0.5649°E
- Location: Magdalen Road, St Leonards-on-Sea, Hastings, East Sussex TN37 6ET
- Country: England
- Denomination: Roman Catholic
- Website: www.rcchurchesinstleonardsonsea.org.uk

History
- Status: Church
- Founded: 1848 (original convent chapel); 1866 (first church); 21 July 1888 (present church)
- Dedication: Thomas of Canterbury
- Consecrated: 1907
- Events: 1848: first Roman Catholic place of worship opened 1866: new church opened on Magdalen Road; 1887: church destroyed by fire 1889: present church opened on the same site

Architecture
- Functional status: Active
- Heritage designation: Grade II
- Designated: 13 December 2006
- Architect: Charles Alban Buckler
- Style: Early English Gothic Revival
- Completed: 6 July 1889

Administration
- Diocese: Arundel and Brighton
- Deanery: St Leonards-on-Sea
- Parish: St Leonards-on-Sea and Hollington

Clergy
- Priest: Rev Míċeál Beatty

The Church of St Thomas of Canterbury and English Martyrs is the Roman Catholic church serving St Leonards-on-Sea, a town and seaside resort which is part of the Borough of Hastings in East Sussex, England. The present church, which combines a plain, unadorned Gothic Revival exterior with a lavishly decorated interior featuring extensive early 20th-century paintings by Nathaniel Westlake, is the third building used for Roman Catholic worship in the seaside resort. James Burton's new town of 1827, immediately west of Hastings, was home to a convent from 1848; public worship then transferred to a new church nearby in 1866. When this burnt down, prolific and "distinguished" architect Charles Alban Buckler designed a replacement. The church remains in use as the main place of worship in a parish which extends into nearby Hollington, and has been listed at Grade II by English Heritage for its architectural and historical importance.

== History ==
St Leonards-on-Sea was conceived and built as a new town by James Burton, a builder, property developer and speculator. In 1828, he bought a large area of wooded, sloping land (formerly part of the Manor of Gensing) which had a long shoreline facing the English Channel. He spent the next few years laying out a high-class planned community with houses, shops, hotels, markets, an Anglican church and facilities suitable for a fashionable seaside resort. Within a few years, it rivalled its ancient neighbour Hastings in size and popularity.

A Roman Catholic place of worship was soon provided in the growing town. Rev. John Jones, the Honorary Chaplain of the Bavarian Embassy in London, received from the will of Lady Barbara Stanley a bequest of £10,000, 16 acres (6.5 ha) of land and a house in St Leonards-on-Sea, all to be used for "religious purposes" for the benefit of Roman Catholics. He planned to build a convent for Jesuits, and extended the house for their use. They declared it unsuitable, and the proposed chapel and convent—large, intricately designed buildings in the Italianate style, conceived by Charles Parker—were not built. Work on less ambitious Gothic Revival-style buildings began in 1837, overseen by A.W.N. Pugin, and a newly founded order of nuns—The Society of the Holy Child Jesus—moved in. Pugin started work on a convent chapel in 1848, but it was not completed until 1869 (by his son Edward Welby) and the convent refectory initially served as a temporary chapel for the sisters and the general public. The permanent chapel was dedicated to St Michael and All Angels.

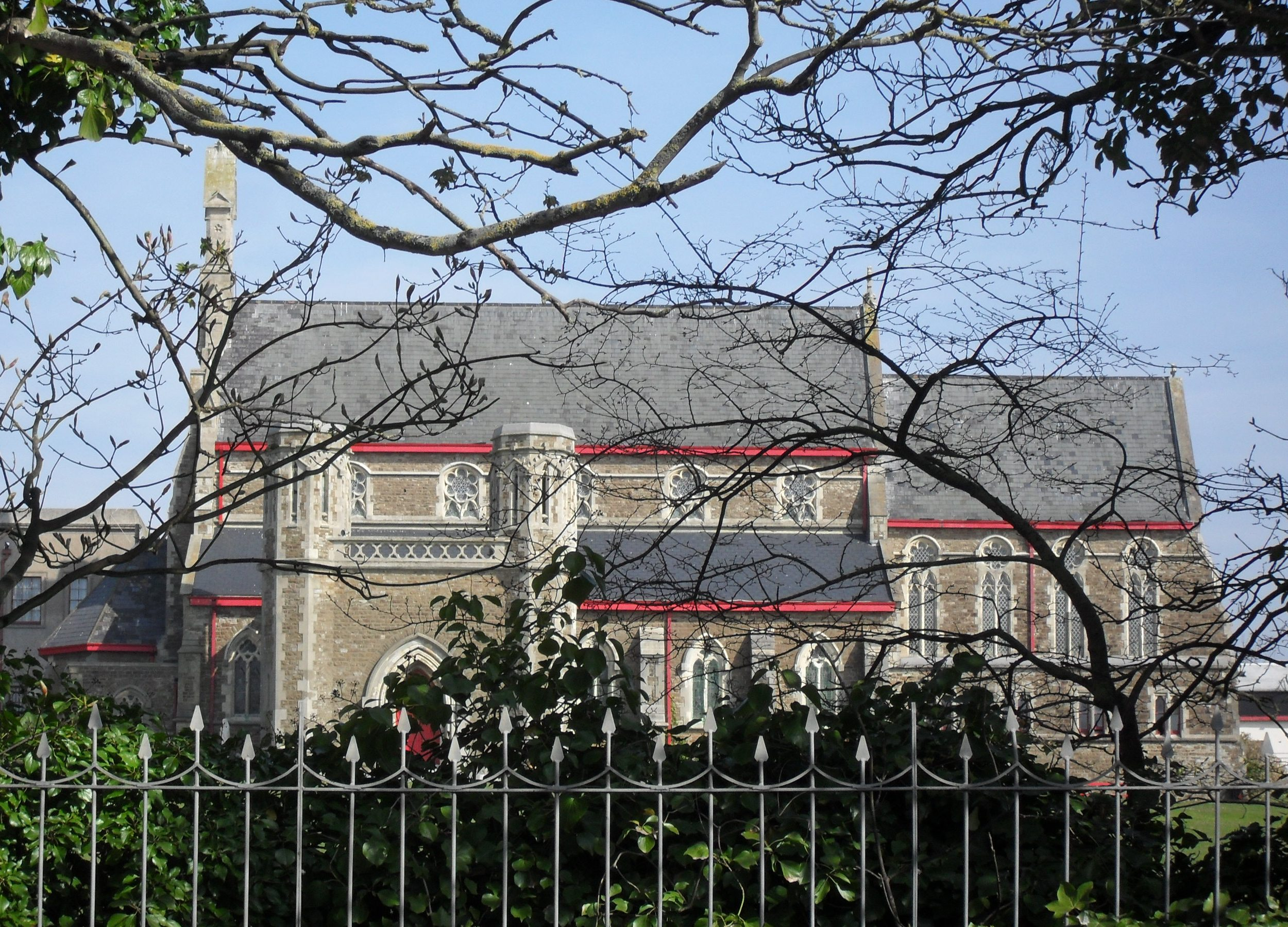
St Michael and All Angels convent chapel was St Leonards-on-Sea's first Roman Catholic place of worship.

Relations between the convent sisters and the parish were difficult, and in 1866 a new church was built for public use nearby, after which the convent chapel reverted to private use for The Society of the Holy Child Jesus only. The chosen site, on the west side of Magdalen Road near the convent, was above the east portal of Hastings Tunnel, a railway tunnel near Warrior Square station. The church was designed by Charles Alban Buckler, a Roman Catholic convert and "one of the most distinguished early to mid-Victorian Roman Catholic architects". It was founded on 21 August 1865 and opened for public worship on 24 May 1866, and was consecrated in 1868 by the Bishop of Southwark Thomas Grant. Its most distinctive fixture was a large pietà carved in oak. It was dedicated to St Thomas of Canterbury (Thomas Becket) and the English Martyrs (Catholics executed during the Reformation) and was registered for marriages in June 1866.

The church was destroyed by fire on 3 January 1887. Within two months, a tin tabernacle had been erected on the site to allow worship to continue while a new church was designed and built. Charles Alban Buckler was again asked to design the replacement church. Construction started on 30 March 1888, although the foundation stone was laid on 21 July of that year. Builder Edmund Boniface executed Buckler's design, and the new Church of St Thomas of Canterbury and English Martyrs opened to the public on 6 July 1889.

Between 1908 and 1911, Nathaniel Westlake painted the interior with a range of vivid murals depicting scenes from the Bible. Much of this was stencilled, but the work is unusually extensive and it is unusual for such designs to have survived in churches. Weather damage necessitated repairs in the 1950s, but by 1981 the murals' condition was so poor that whitewashing over them appeared to be the only course of action. Enough money was raised for a full restoration to take place; artist Charles Camm was responsible for this.

== Architecture ==
There is a great contrast between the austere, minimalist exterior of the Church of St Thomas of Canterbury and English Martyrs and its elaborately decorated interior. Architecturally, Charles Alban Buckler was a medievalist who worked almost exclusively in the Gothic Revival style—particularly Early English Gothic. His church at St Leonards-on-Sea was a good example of this: typical Gothic exterior features included trefoil and tall lancet windows, a multi-sided apse and buttressing. The walls are of ironstone and Bath Stone with some irregular rock facing. The plan consists of a nave with six bays and vaulted side chapels treated like simple arcades, a chancel with its own side chapels (all with apsidal ends), a porch, sanctuary, narthex and mortuary chapel (a later addition). The building lacks a tower or spire, and the effect from the outside is an appearance "as sparing as a friars' church".

The "richly decorated" interior has been described as "unexpected" after this simple exterior. The vividly coloured painted murals, some purely decorative and some representative of Biblical scenes, date from 1908–1911 and have been repaired and enhanced since. Some windows have stained glass, apparently by Charles Eamer Kempe and the Clayton and Bell and Hardman & Co. firms. Nathaniel Westlake's images include St Michael (in the side chapel dedicated to St George), the English Martyrs and the Hand of God above the chancel arch, various saints and prophets on the chancel ceiling, a Nativity on the south wall and a Last Supper on the north wall. Original fittings include some pews in the nave, a carved organ case, a marble font with carvings depicting the Seven Sacraments, a similar pulpit with images of saints and (in the Lady chapel) a Bath Stone altar with depictions of the Virgin Mary, Jesus and angels.

== The church today ==
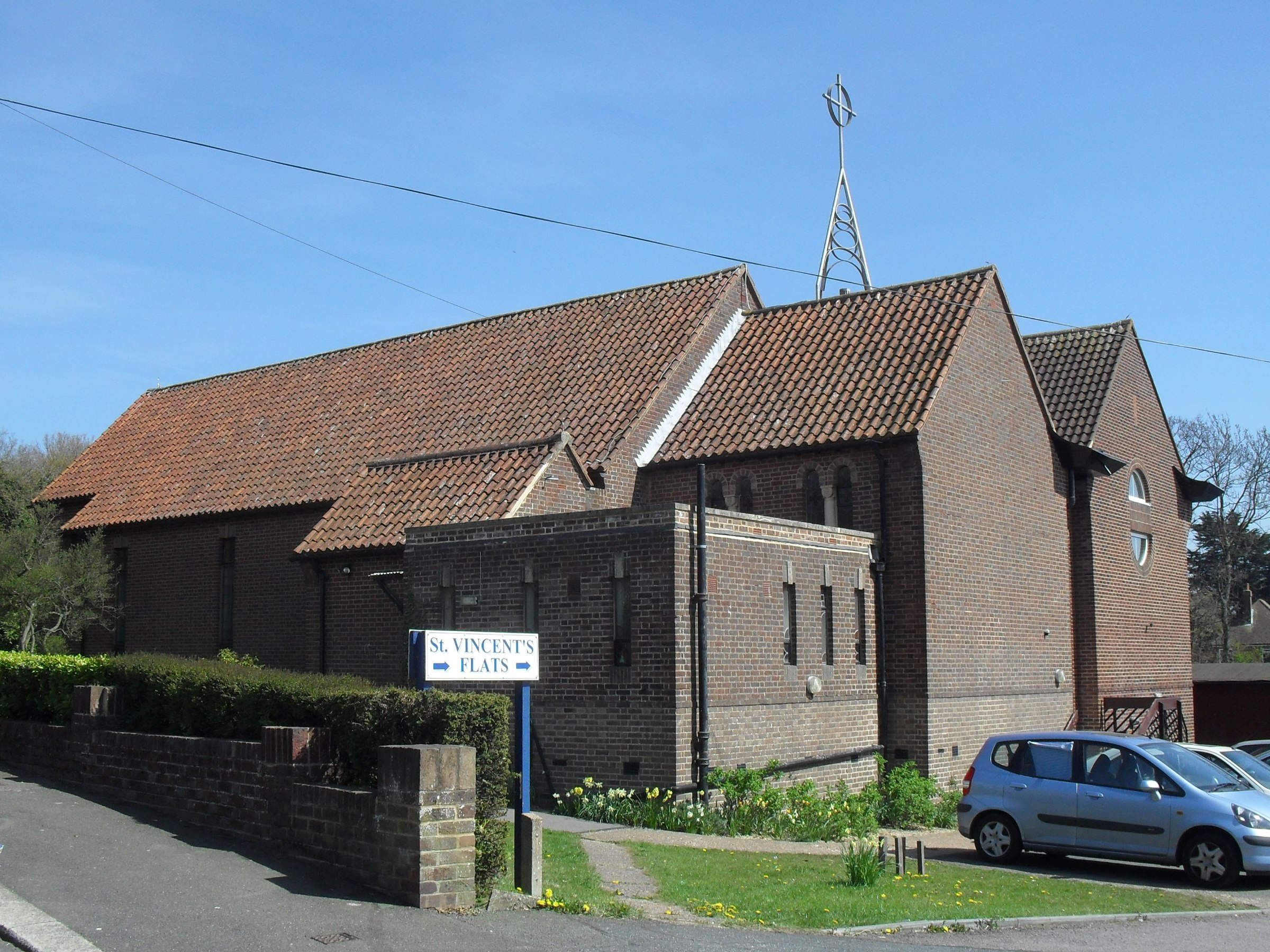
The Church of the Holy Redeemer in Hollington is in the parish.

The Church of St Thomas of Canterbury and English Martyrs was listed at Grade II by English Heritage on 13 December 2006. This defines it as a "nationally important" building of "special interest". As of February 2001, there were 521 Grade II listed buildings, and 535 listed buildings of all grades, in the borough of Hastings.

In an architectural survey of the Diocese of Arundel and Brighton's churches undertaken in 2005 before the church was listed, it was stated that it was "likely to be listable" in the future. The authors noted that Buckler's other churches: St Richard's (Slindon), St Edward the Confessor, and the former St Peter's Church (Shoreham-by-Sea) were already listed and the interior decoration scheme "[made] it special".

It is one of several listed churches in St Leonards-on-Sea: the Anglican churches of Christ Church, St Peter's and St John the Evangelist are classed at the higher Grade II*, while St Leonard's Anglican parish church, St Leonard's Baptist Church and the Greek Orthodox St Mary Magdalene's Church, along with the former St Leonards-on-Sea Congregational Church, are also Grade II-listed. Pugin's former convent chapel, now disused, also has Grade II* status.

The church is one of two in the parish of St Leonards-on-Sea and Hollington. This is one of five parishes (consisting of seven churches) which make up the Deanery of St Leonards-on-Sea, which is in turn one of 13 deaneries in the Roman Catholic Diocese of Arundel and Brighton. The other church in the parish is the Church of the Holy Redeemer in Hollington, an ancient village which developed in the interwar and postwar eras into a large suburb of Hastings. Wilfred Mangan's Vernacular brick church of 1934 became part of the parish in 1959 and was extended and reordered internally in the 1980s. There is another Roman Catholic church in the borough: Our Lady Star of the Sea (1882) in Hastings Old Town.

Two Masses are celebrated each Sunday at the church. Confession is heard weekly on Saturday mornings. The church is licensed for worship in accordance with the Places of Worship Registration Act 1855 and has the registration number 31803.

== See also ==
- List of places of worship in Hastings

== Bibliography ==
- Buckle, Alan G. (2003). An Independent Chapel: The Story of St Luke's in Silverhill 1853–2003. Hastings: Hastings Local History Group.
- Elleray, D. Robert (2004). Sussex Places of Worship. Worthing: Optimus Books. ISBN 0-9533132-7-1.
- Gillow, Joseph (1885). A Literary and Biographical History, or Bibliographical Dictionary, of the English Catholics from the Breach with Rome, in 1534, to the Present Time (TXT). Vol. 3. London: Burns & Oates.
- Manwaring Baines, J. (1990) [1956]. Burton's St Leonards (2nd ed.). Hastings: Hastings Museum.
- Nairn, Ian; Pevsner, Nikolaus (1965). The Buildings of England: Sussex. Harmondsworth: Penguin Books. ISBN 0-14-071028-0.
- Various authors (2003) [1991]. Hollington: The Village Past and Present (2nd ed.). Hastings: Hastings Local History Group.
