= List of places of worship in Hastings =

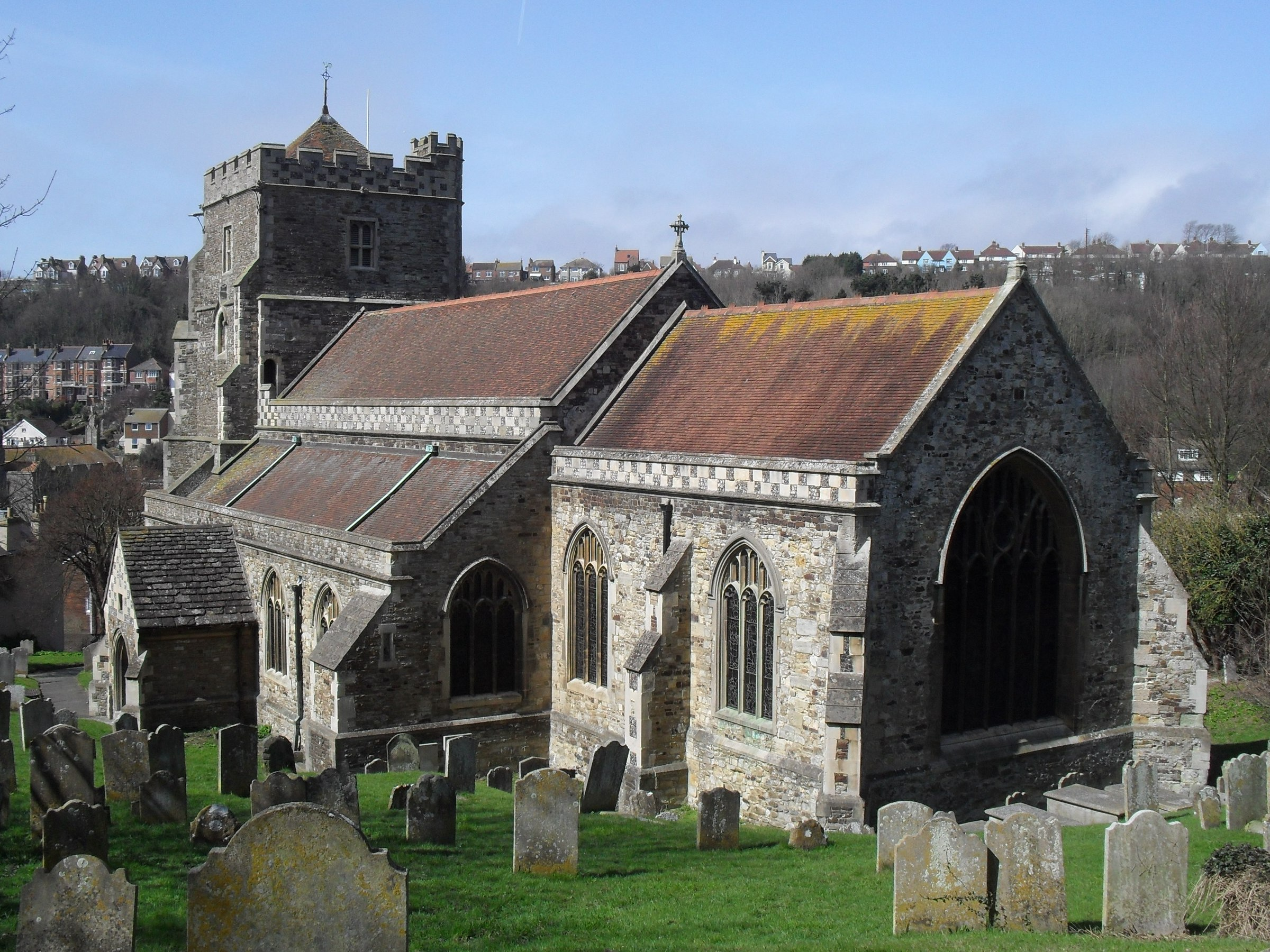
All Saints Church, one of two surviving medieval churches in the centre of Hastings, overlooks the Old Town.

The borough of Hastings, one of six local government districts in the English county of East Sussex, has 47 extant places of worship serving a wide range of religious denominations. A further 33 buildings formerly used for public worship, but now closed or used for other purposes, also exist. The borough is made up of the ancient port and seaside resort of Hastings, the neighbouring planned resort of St Leonards-on-Sea (united with its former rival in 1888) and their 19th- and 20th-century suburbs, some of which (such as Ore and Hollington) were autonomous villages until they were absorbed into the growing urban area. Ancient churches existed in the Old Town of Hastings and in the villages, although some were lost in the medieval era; growth stimulated by transport improvements and the popularity of sea bathing encouraged a rush of church-building in the Victorian era; and more churches and congregations were established throughout the 20th century, despite periods of stagnation and decline.

A majority of residents of Hastings identify themselves as Christian, and churches representing many Christian denominations exist in the town. The largest number of these belong to the Church of England, the country's officially established church. Roman Catholic and Protestant Nonconformist churches of many types are also prevalent, and St Leonards-on-Sea has a mosque. The spread of housing inland in the 20th century, in suburbs such as Silverhill Park, Broomgrove and the vastly expanded Hollington (which was transformed from a haphazard collection of cottages among fields into a 1960s council estate), resulted in the founding of new churches, partly offsetting the loss through demolition of others in Hastings town centre.

Historic England or its predecessor English Heritage have awarded listed status to 25 current and former church buildings in Hastings. A building is defined as "listed" when it is placed on a statutory register of buildings of "special architectural or historic interest" in accordance with the Planning (Listed Buildings and Conservation Areas) Act 1990. The Department for Digital, Culture, Media and Sport, a Government department, is responsible for this; Historic England, a non-departmental public body, acts as an agency of the department to administer the process and advise the department on relevant issues. There are three grades of listing status. Grade I, the highest, is defined as being of "exceptional interest"; Grade II* is used for "particularly important buildings of more than special interest"; and Grade II, the lowest, is used for buildings of "special interest".

== Overview of Hastings and its places of worship ==
Hastings' location within East Sussex

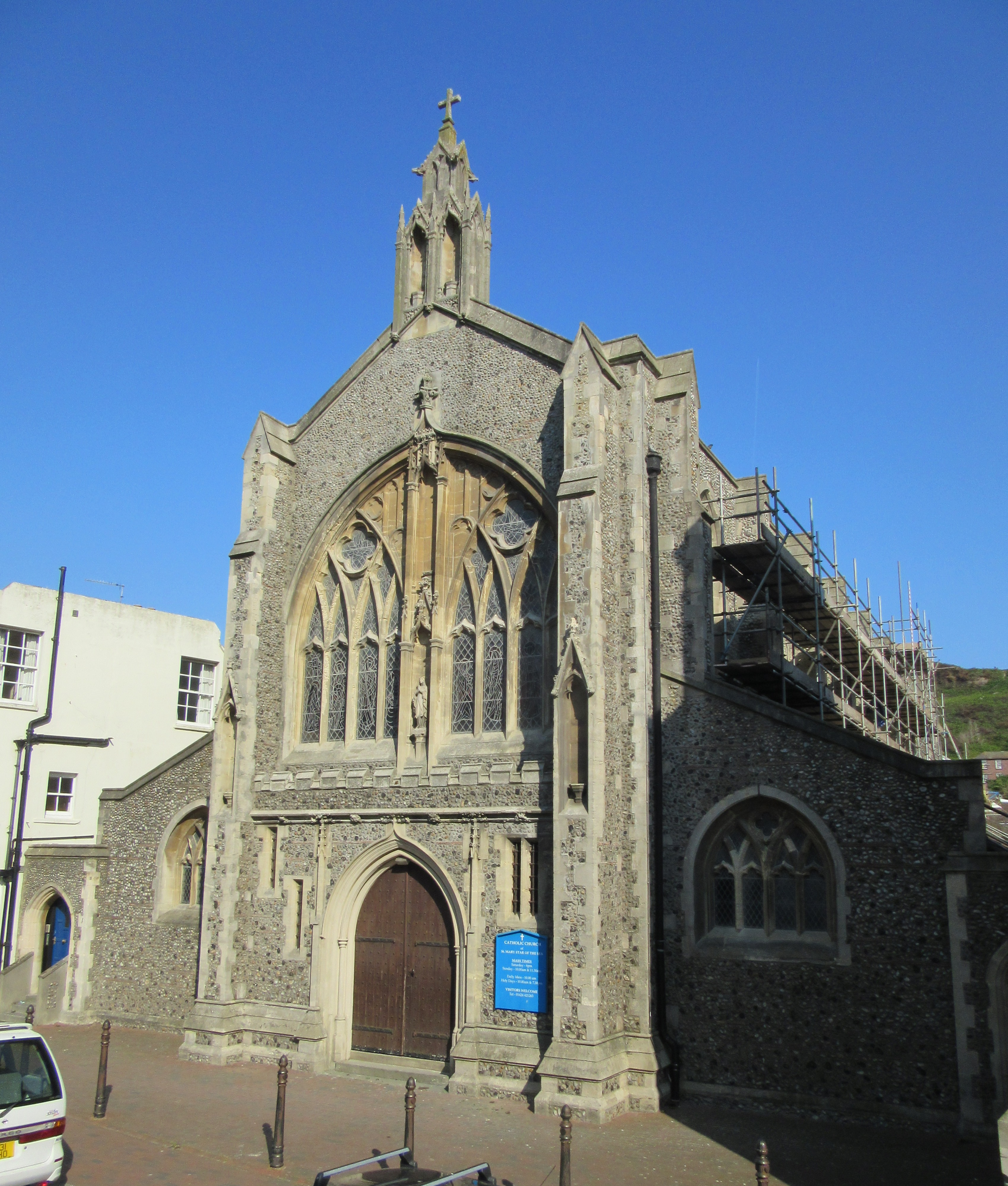
St Mary Star of the Sea Church has served Catholics in Hastings since 1883.

Hastings is a seaside town on the southeast coast of England, facing the English Channel. The borough covers 2,972.4 hectares (7,345 acres; 11.477 sq mi) and had a population of 90,254 at the time of the 2011 United Kingdom census. Hastings is most famous for the battle fought nearby in 1066, in which William the Conqueror's Norman army defeated the English troops of King Harold II, but its recorded history is much longer: fifth-century origins have been attributed, Roman settlement on the site has never been proved but is considered likely, and a town had developed by 928, when it was important enough to have its own mint. By the 12th century, it was the main member of the Cinque Ports, and its castle dominated the cliff below which the ancient settlement developed. There were seven churches in 1291, when Pope Nicholas IV ordered a survey of all places of worship in England, but decline set in during the 14th century and two French raids wrecked the town. By 1801, just two of the old churches—All Saints and St Clement's—survived.

The common thread throughout the town's history has been fishing: in 1329 a priest was threatened with excommunication for failing to pay the Bishop of Chichester the 2,000 herring demanded by custom, and a beach-based fishing fleet still exists in the 21st century. The fishermen even had their own church from 1854 until World War II: the rectors of All Saints and St Clement's got together to provide a chapel of ease on the beach to serve their spiritual needs. The former St Nicholas' Church is now Hastings Fishermen's Museum. The town's focus moved away from this industry and towards tourism and leisure from the early 19th century, though, as development spread west from the old town. Improved transport opened the town up to day-trippers, especially from London; sea-bathing, promenading and other seaside leisure activities became increasingly fashionable; and James Burton capitalised on the demand for growth by founding an entirely new town, St Leonards-on-Sea, immediately west of Hastings—spurring its older rival into further growth. The population rose from 2,982 to 6,051 between 1801 and 1821, and the need to build more churches was recognised. In 1824, St Mary-in-the-Castle Church, which took its dedication from a ruined collegiate church in the castle grounds, was the first new Anglican church to be built outside Hastings Old Town. Development was so rapid that Holy Trinity Church, the second town church in Hastings, had to be crowded into a "crazy site" when it was built in the 1850s. St Leonards-on-Sea gained its first Anglican church, St Leonard's, in 1837, followed by St Mary Magdalen's Church in 1852. Rapid population growth continued throughout the 19th century: for example, the 1871 census recorded 29,289 residents, and there were 65,528 in 1901. In response to this, 27 churches were built in Hastings and St Leonards-on-Sea in the second half of the century. Some were intended for high-class, fashionable visitors and residents; others were developed "with missionary zeal to bring some hope of redemption to working-class areas".

In 1897, an Act of Parliament brought several surrounding villages into the borough of Hastings; nine years earlier the same had happened to St Leonards-on-Sea. Places such as Ore and Hollington had become suburbanised but retained ancient churches as well as gaining new ones: Ore's 12th-century St Helen's Church was ruined in the 19th century, but a replacement was built nearby and a second, Christ Church (distinguished by the "very naughty turret" on its roof), was provided to serve the village's Victorian suburbs; and Hollington's 13th-century church in the middle of a wood was later supplemented by a second Anglican church after the scattered village was redeveloped into Hastings' largest council estate.

Organised worship by the Roman Catholic community dates back to 1848, when the now disused St Michael's Chapel in St Leonards-on-Sea was opened for public use. Permanent churches were opened in both Hastings and St Leonards-on-Sea in the 1880s: at Hastings, the very tall, complex Free Gothic Revival St Mary Star of the Sea Church (1881–83, by Basil Champneys) was partly funded by poet Coventry Patmore while the much more austere Church of St Thomas of Canterbury and English Martyrs, St Leonards-on-Sea (1888–89, by Charles Alban Buckler) replaced an earlier building by the same architect which had been destroyed by fire in 1887. Hollington's 20th-century growth prompted the construction of the Church of the Holy Redeemer in 1934 and its major extension 50 years later. In the suburbs, a convent chapel built in 1924 was used for public worship in Clive Vale for a time (the last regular public Masses were celebrated in 1988), and two permanent churches were built. In 1963, a chapel of ease to St Mary, Star of the Sea was registered in Ore, followed by an additional church in Bulverhythe the next year. Both have now closed: the Church of the Holy Ghost at Bulverhythe, latterly served from St Leonards-on-Sea, was closed in 1988 and deregistered the following year, while the Church of the Holy Apostles at Ore went out of use in 1994.

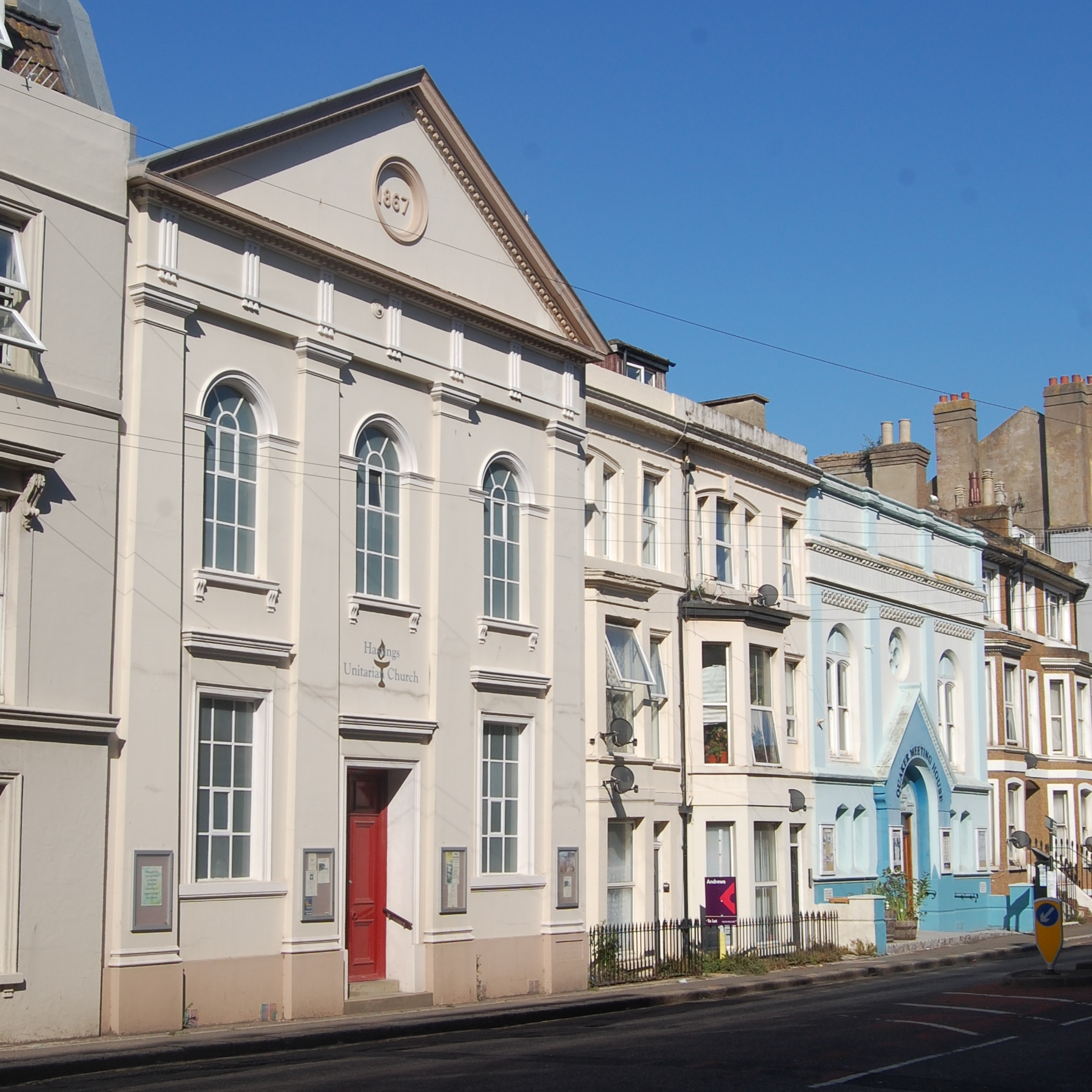
The Unitarian (left) and Quaker (right) meeting houses stand close together on South Terrace.

The borough has an array of Nonconformist places of worship. Protestant Dissenters were not universally welcomed at first: the town's first Congregational chapel, planned in 1807, had to be built in London and taken to the town by sea because no local firm wanted to build it. The weatherboarded chapel's successor survived until 1972. Other early chapels were built for Baptists: Ebenezer Chapel was established in 1817 (it is now a house, but the congregation has moved to another building) and another opened on Wellington Square for General Baptists in 1838. Residents of St Leonards-on-Sea have been served by St Leonard's Baptist Church since 1882, and a church was registered in Halton in 1957. The early Congregational chapel, situated in the old town, was supplemented by churches at Robertson Street (1856; rebuilt 1884–85), St Leonards-on-Sea (1863), Mount Pleasant Road at Blacklands (1878–79), Clive Vale (1887) and Bulverhythe (1895). All of these joined the United Reformed Church upon its formation in 1972 except St Leonards-on-Sea: this instead became a Congregational Federation church, but it closed in the early 21st century. Clive Vale United Reformed Church is still open, as is the 1970s successor (St Mark's) to the chapel at Blacklands; Robertson Street is now a Pentecostal church; and Bulverhythe is in secular use as a hall. The United Reformed Church was formed by a merger between the Congregational Church and Presbyterian Church of England, and the latter's St Luke's Church (1857) remains in use.

The Methodist Statistical Returns published in 1947 (Note: The statistical return was compiled between 1940 and 1947 with the aim of documenting all Methodist chapels extant at that time: their location, previous affiliation prior to the Methodist Union of 1932, capacity, building materials and similar details.) recorded the existence of eight Methodist chapels in Hastings and St Leonards-on-Sea, all but one of which were of Wesleyan origin. At that time, the Hastings Circuit was responsible for Central Methodist Church, a 750-capacity building in the town centre, and outlying chapels in the Old Town (Wesley Chapel; capacity 268 worshippers), Halton (the Calvert Memorial Church; 500), Hollington (300) and Ore (St Helen's Methodist Church; 220). The St Leonards and Bexhill Circuit was responsible for former Wesleyan chapels at Norman Road and Park Road (with space for 550 and 450 worshippers respectively) and a chapel on Newgate Road (150) which was originally Primitive Methodist. Of these, only the Calvert Memorial and Park Road churches remain open. William Willmer Pocock's Central Methodist Church of 1875, on a "distinctive corner site", was demolished in 1980. Bourne Street is now residential (having been in commercial use after its closure), the church on Norman Road went out of religious use in 2008, Hollington closed in 2016 and merged with Park Road Church to form the present St Leonards Methodist Church, and St Helen's Methodist Church at Ore shut in the same year and its congregation now worship in a community centre. The former Primitive Methodist chapel was the earliest closure, being converted into a hall for secular use in 1939.

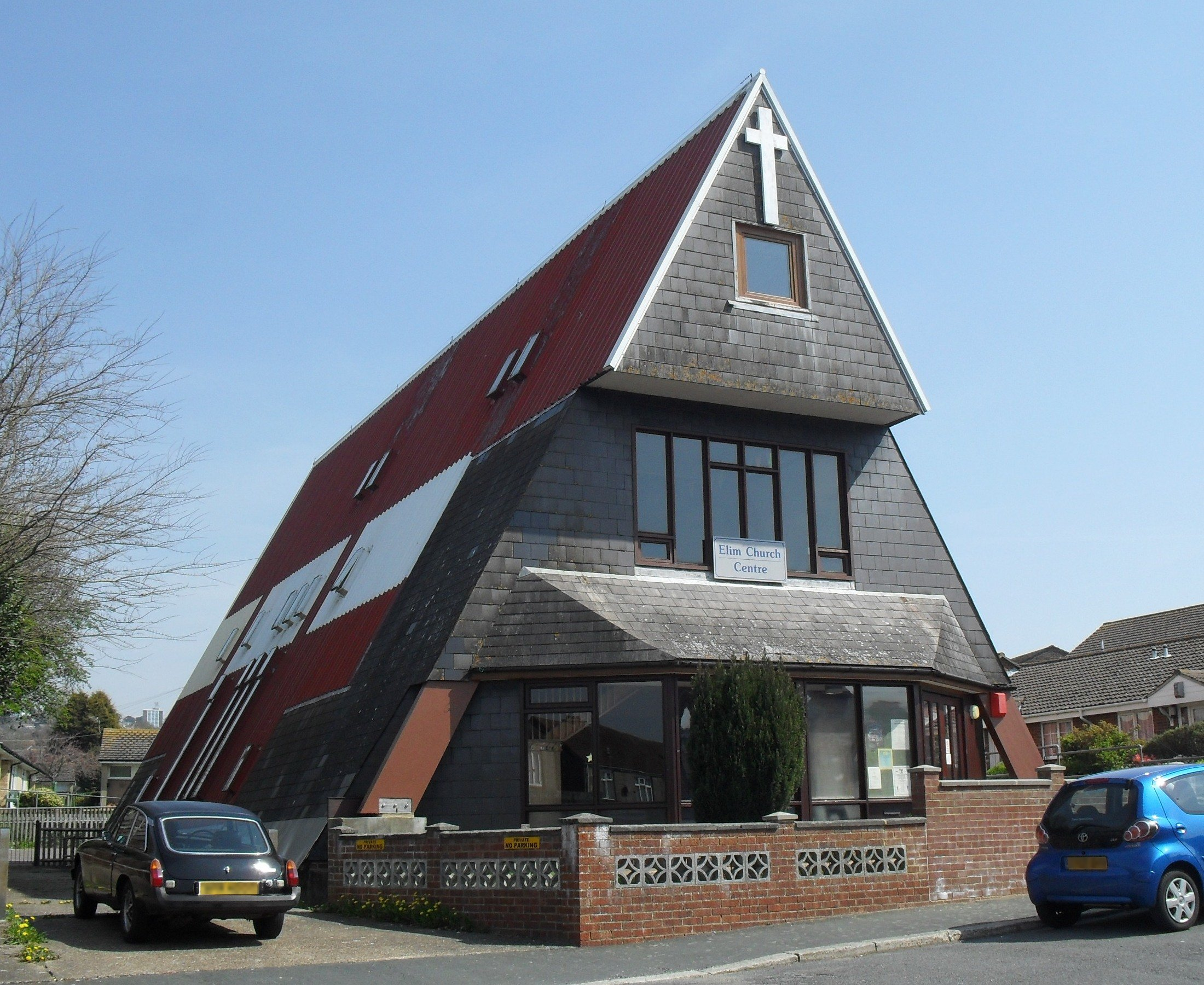
The distinctive Elim Pentecostal church was built in the 1980s.

Various Brethren groups have been prominent since the early 20th century. Rainbow Hall in Silverhill (registered in 1930) was succeeded in 1962 by Alexandra Chapel for Christian (Open) Brethren. The building was re-registered as "The Lighthouse" in 2023. The former Gospel hall at the junction of Castle Hill Road and Stonefield Road (registered for worship in 1921 and for marriages in 1947) closed in 1990 and is now a house. Brethren in St Leonards-on-Sea met in hired rooms in Cross Street before moving to a Gospel hall on Norman Road by 1935 and then to a new building, the Ponswood Road Room, in 1953 (this building is now Ebenezer Baptist Church). A meeting room (no longer extant) was also registered on Stockleigh Road in 1966. The Plymouth Brethren Christian Church sect use a meeting room (1972) off the Battle Road.

Many other religious groups are represented in the borough. Quakers and Unitarians meet in buildings a short distance apart on South Terrace: the Quaker meeting house dates from 1864, while the Unitarian church was built three years later and opened in 1868. The Salvation Army have met nearby since the 1880s; their citadel was enlarged in 1937, two years after a second was opened in a converted cinema in Ore. Places of worship for Spiritualists and Seventh-day Adventists were registered in 1944 and 1968 respectively. For Jehovah's Witnesses, Kingdom Halls were registered in St Leonards-on-Sea in 1976 (no longer in use), Hollington in 1988 and Ore in 2007. An Elim Pentecostal church was registered in 1981, the His Place Community Church—an independent Pentecostal group founded in 1984—now use the former United Reformed church in Robertson Street, and the Bethel Full Gospel Church (Assemblies of God Pentecostal) has occupied a building in Halton since 2003. Latter-day Saints and Christian Scientists registered buildings in Hollington and Silverhill respectively in 1970; the former was replaced by a permanent meetinghouse in 1990, while the First Church of Christ, Scientist, Hastings and St Leonards-on-Sea was dissolved in 1996 and the building is in alternative use. Evangelical and non-denominational churches include The Tabernacle (1854), The Independent Church (formerly Kenilworth Evangelical Mission; registered 1977) The King's Church (registered 1995) and Sonrise Church, which occupies a former Anglican church building; another redundant Anglican church was converted into St Mary Magdalene's Greek Orthodox Church in the early 1980s. Muslims converted a building in St Leonards-on-Sea into a mosque and community centre in the 1980s.

== Religious affiliation ==
According to the 2021 United Kingdom census, 90,995 people lived in Hastings. Of these, 37.83% identified themselves as Christian, 1.94% were Muslim, 0.62% were Buddhist, 0.51% were Hindu, 0.19% were Jewish, 0.04% were Sikh, 0.89% followed another religion, 51.38% claimed no religious affiliation and 6.59% did not state their religion. The proportion of people who followed no religion was higher than the figure in England as a whole (36.67%), and there were proportinally more Buddhists in Hastings as well: 0.46% of people nationally are Buddhist. Christianity, Islam, Judaism, Hinduism, Buddhism and Sikhism had a lower following in the borough than in the country overall: in 2021, 46.32% of people in England were Christian, 6.73% were Muslim, 1.81% were Hindu, 0.92% were Sikh and 0.48% were Jewish.

== Administration ==
All Anglican churches in Hastings are part of the Diocese of Chichester, whose cathedral is at Chichester, and the Lewes and Hastings Archdeaconry—one of three subdivisions which make up the next highest level of administration. In turn, this archdeaconry is divided into eight deaneries. One of these, the Rural Deanery of Hastings, covers the whole borough and includes all 16 open Anglican churches. St Leonard's Church at St Leonards-on-Sea and All Souls Church at Clive Vale, both closed in the early 21st century, were also part of this Rural Deanery.

The Roman Catholic Diocese of Arundel and Brighton, whose cathedral is at Arundel, administers the borough's three Roman Catholic churches. All three—St Mary Star of the Sea at Hastings, St Thomas of Canterbury and the English Martyrs at St Leonards-on-Sea and the Church of the Holy Redeemer at Hollington—are part of the Eastbourne and St Leonards-on-Sea Deanery, one of 11 deaneries in the diocese. The churches at St Leonards-on-Sea and Hollington are part of a joint parish.

The four United Reformed Churches in the borough as of 2011, at Robertson Street and St Mark's (both now closed), Clive Vale and Silverhill, were part of the West Kent and East Sussex Synod Area of the Church—a group of 32 churches within the Southern Synod region.

The Hastings, Bexhill & Rye Methodist Circuit, a circuit in the Methodist Church's South East District, covers 12 churches of that denomination in the Hastings area. Three of those are in the borough: the Calvert Memorial church at Halton, the church at St Helen's (now housed in Ore Community Centre following the closure of the chapel building in 2016), and the former Park Road Church in Bohemia (now called St Leonards-on-Sea Methodist Church).

== Current places of worship ==
Current places of worship
Name	Image	Location	Denomination/ Affiliation	Grade	Notes	Refs
All Saints Church (More images)		Old Town; 50.8593°N 0.5964°E	Anglican	II*	The medieval town's "upper church", so called because of its hilltop position, is an early 15th-century Perpendicular Gothic structure of rubble and flint. William Butterfield's restoration of 1870 included a large east window. Titus Oates was a curate in the 17th century.	
Christ Church (More images)		Blacklands; 50.8669°N 0.5777°E	Anglican	II*	Henry Carpenter's Decorated Gothic church of 1881, for the high-class suburb of Blacklands, is dominated by its tower (completed in 1890) but has elaborate interior fittings, such as Hardman & Co.'s chancel work and a Carrara marble font depicting an angel bearing a shell.	
Christ Church (More images)		St Leonards-on-Sea; 50.8538°N 0.5593°E	Anglican	II*	Arthur Blomfield's tall, Early English-style church of 1875 (consecrated nine years later) replaced an earlier building which still stands on the south side. Always High church in its liturgical tradition, its first vicar Rev. Charles Lyndhurst Vaughan was key to the town's religious and social development.	
Holy Trinity Church (More images)		Hastings; 50.8551°N 0.5767°E	Anglican	II*	The second 19th-century Anglican church in Hastings was planned for Cambridge Road, but problems with the site caused Samuel Sanders Teulon to reconfigure his design to an awkward ("crazy", to Nikolaus Pevsner) location nearby. The stone and rubble exterior conceals a highly ornate interior. The dedication recalls a lost 12th-century priory nearby.	
St Clement's Church (More images)		Old Town; 50.8574°N 0.5909°E	Anglican	II*	The "Town church" as it is known locally was rebuilt after the French attacks on Hastings in 1377 and restored in 1875 by William Butterfield, who did the same to neighbouring All Saints Church. The vast range of memorials in the Perpendicular Gothic church include one for the marriage of Dante Gabriel Rossetti and Elizabeth Siddal.	
St John the Evangelist's Church (More images)		St Leonards-on-Sea; 50.8559°N 0.5530°E	Anglican	II*	Only the octagonal tower survived World War II bombing; the rest of Arthur Blomfield's 1881 brick and stone church serving Upper St Leonards was rebuilt by Harry Stuart Goodhart-Rendel in 1951. English Heritage describe it as a "particularly eclectic mix".	
St Matthew's Church (More images)		Silverhill; 50.8656°N 0.5556°E	Anglican	II*	Founded on St Matthew's Day (21 September) 1860 and opened the following year, local architect George Voysey's original church was replaced by John Loughborough Pearson's much larger red-brick Gothic Revival structure in 1885. Internal features include Aston Webb's reredos and a sturdy king post nave roof of local timber.	
Christ Church (More images)		Ore; 50.8722°N 0.6082°E	Anglican	II	The rector of Ore helped to fund a new church in the village centre to serve the influx of working-class people in the mid-19th century. A.D. Gough's Decorated Gothic stone church dates from 1858 and is distinguished by a large bell turret, a feature described as "very naughty" by Pevsner. Bomb damage in 1943 was soon repaired.	
St Leonard's Church (Church in the Wood) (More images)		Hollington; 50.8743°N 0.5380°E	Anglican	II	A chapel stood on this isolated site in the middle of a wood in the 11th century, and the present building retains 13th-century work despite major restoration in 1865. The short tower is partly tile-hung and has a pyramid-shaped cap. Jean-Baptiste Capronnier designed the stained glass.	
Emmanuel Church (More images)		West Hill; 50.8616°N 0.5892°E	Anglican	–	The local architecture firm of Jeffrey & Skiller designed and built the West Hill area's Anglican church in 1873. It stands at a high point in Hastings and has significant townscape presence. The stone Early English-style building lost its adjacent vicarage to a bomb in 1942.	
St Barnabas' Church (More images)		Broomgrove; 50.8736°N 0.5937°E	Anglican	–	Local architect Hector Sweatman's design for a new church in the parish of St Helen's in Ore was accepted in 1954, although proposals for a church on this site dated back to 1949. The brick building has flexible space for religious and community activities.	
St Ethelburga's Church (More images)		Bulverhythe; 50.8524°N 0.5337°E	Anglican	–	John B. Mendham's modest Gothic Revival church dates from 1929 and serves the Bulverhythe area of the seafront west of St Leonards-on-Sea in the far southwest of the borough. The brown-brick structure is dominated by a large Art Deco-style tower with thin pinnacles set below the top of the bell tower stage.	
St Helen's Church (More images)		St Helen's; 50.8820°N 0.5871°E	Anglican	–	Built to replace its ruinous 12th-century predecessor nearby, this church was designed in 1869 by Edgar Brock, many of whose Sussex churches were executed in partnership with the Habershon brothers. The stone used to build it was quarried locally. Its distinctive spire was removed in 1966 and replaced with a small cap.	
St John the Evangelist's Church (More images)		Hollington; 50.8788°N 0.5513°E	Anglican	–	E. Alexander Wyon's Early English-style church dates from 1865 and was parished five years later. Blue and pale (Bath) stonework predominates. Local philanthropist Countess Waldegrave founded the church on land provided by local men who realised that Hollington's focus of development was moving away from Church in the Wood.	
St Peter and St Paul's Church (More images)		Silverhill Park; 50.8791°N 0.5692°E	Anglican	–	This small yellow-brick church, with a many-sided layout and a copper roof, was opened in 1969 on Parkstone Road in the postwar Silverhill Park estate. It is in the parish of St John the Evangelist, Hollington.	
Wellington Square Baptist Church (More images)		Hastings; 50.8560°N 0.5819°E	Baptist	II*	Wellington Square was an early high-class residential development in Hastings: it was built on the site of some lime kilns in the 1820s. A Baptist church was integrated into it in 1838 and was registered for marriages in May 1841. Arched sash windows, stucco and an unbroken parapet and moulded cornice give a Neoclassical appearance.	
St Leonard's Baptist Church (More images)		St Leonards-on-Sea; 50.8566°N 0.5616°E	Baptist	II	Thomas Elworthy's Baptist church of 1882 is an ornate Classical/Italianate design with pairs of Corinthian pilasters on its three-bay façade, a balustrade at first-floor level, round-headed windows, an elaborate pediment and extensive use of terracotta decoration. The gallery inside is supported on slender iron columns. The chapel was registered for marriages in February 1885.	
Halton Baptist Church (More images)		Halton; 50.8682°N 0.6011°E	Baptist	–	This modern Baptist church, built in the Vernacular style, stands on the Old London Road on the way to Ore village. It was registered for worship in April 1957 and for marriages 14 months later.	
Calvary Chapel Hastings (More images)		Silverhill; 50.8705°N 0.5573°E	Non-denominational (Calvary Chapel Association)	–	St Matthew's Church founded a mission hall on Duke Road, Silverhill, in 1912. It was sold in 1958. In 1994, after a period as an artificial flower factory, it became the home of the St Leonards Assemblies of God Pentecostal Church, founded as a house church in 1985. It was registered by this group in August 1997 and operated under the name "His Place Community Church Centre" until 2014, when the congregation outgrew the building and moved to the former Robertson Street United Reformed Church in Hastings town centre. It was then taken over by Calvary Chapel Hastings, a nondenominational fellowship founded as a house church in 2006 and subsequently based in the Robsack Centre (click for image) at Hollington.	
The Lighthouse (More images)		Silverhill; 50.8702°N 0.5580°E	Non-denominational (Calvary Chapel Association)	–	This opened and was registered as Alexandra Gospel Hall, an Open Brethren place of worship, in 1962 on Sedlescombe Road North, replacing a pair of houses on the site and succeeding an earlier meeting room elsewhere in Silverhill. Its small congregation was boosted in 1990 when members of the former Castle Hill (Stonefield Road) Gospel Hall joined. In 2023 it was taken over and re-registered by the nearby Calvary Chapel Hastings as a second venue for their activities; Sunday morning prayer meetings and Wednesday Bible study groups use the premises.	
The Independent Church (More images)		St Leonards-on-Sea; 50.8581°N 0.5502°E	Non-denominational	–	This tiny chapel, on Albany Road in Upper St Leonards, offers services in a charismatic evangelical style. It was originally registered as the Kenilworth Evangelical Mission and was registered for worship under that name in February 1977 and for marriages two years later.	
Church of St Thomas of Canterbury and English Martyrs (More images)		St Leonards-on-Sea; 50.8565°N 0.5649°E	Roman Catholic	II	The Roman Catholic community moved from the chapel at the Holy Child of Jesus Convent into a new church nearby in 1866. It burnt down in 1887; Charles Alban Buckler's new Gothic Revival building was ready in 1889. Its plain ironstone and Bath stone exterior hides an elaborately decorated interior with rib vaults and wall murals.	
St Mary Star of the Sea Church (More images)		Old Town; 50.8594°N 0.5944°E	Roman Catholic	II	In 1882 poet Coventry Patmore, living in Hastings at the time, commissioned his friend Basil Champneys to build a large, ornate church in memory of his wife. The Decorated/Perpendicular Gothic flint building, on a sloping site, has a crypt underneath and a very high east end with a large window. Inside, the nave continues into the chancel. There is a bellcote but no tower.	
Church of the Holy Redeemer (More images)		Hollington; 50.8782°N 0.5538°E	Roman Catholic	–	The Roman Catholic Church serving Silverhill and Hollington was opened in 1934, although it was not licensed for marriages until March 1959—the year in which it was added to the parish of St Leonards-on-Sea. The plain brick Vernacular structure, designed by Wilfred Mangan, was greatly extended and reoriented in the 1980s.	
Sonrise Church at St Peter's (More images)		Bohemia; 50.8608°N 0.5614°E	Evangelical	II*	Bohemia's former Anglican church is tall, long and lacks a spire or tower (one was planned). It was built in 1885 in the Early English style by James Brooks, and is red-brick inside and out—although much use is made of alabaster for wall finishes and internal fixtures. It was declared redundant by the Diocese of Chichester in November 2011 and has since been occupied by Sonrise Church, an independent Evangelical congregation (for whom it was registered for marriages in February 2016).	
King's Church (More images)		St Helen's; 50.8869°N 0.5699°E	Evangelical	–	This Evangelical church has its origins in a house church established in 1974. Terry Virgo, founder of the Newfrontiers movement, was involved later, and as the congregation grew it moved from Priory Road in Halton and took over a building previously used for indoor cricket.	
Kingdom Hall (More images)		Hollington; 50.8723°N 0.5315°E	Jehovah's Witnesses	–	This modern Kingdom Hall stands on Churchwood Drive in the west of Hollington. It was opened on 12 March 1988 and was registered for worship and marriages two months later. The building can hold 250 people and is used by two Hastings-based Congregations of Jehovah's Witnesses: Central and Hollington.	
Hastings Old Town Kingdom Hall (More images)		Ore; 50.8753°N 0.6113°E	Jehovah's Witnesses	–	Newly built on Old Top Road in the Ore Valley area of the town, this Kingdom Hall was registered for marriages on 5 July 2007. It is used by the Hastings, Old Town Congregation of Jehovah's Witnesses.	
Calvert Memorial Methodist Church (More images)		Halton; 50.8656°N 0.5896°E	Methodist	–	James Calvert, one of the first Christian missionaries to Fiji, was one of the founders of this church, and it now bears his name. The red-brick building, which replaced a tin tabernacle, is an Early English design and was opened in 1892. It was registered for marriages in March 1894.	
St Leonards-on-Sea Methodist Church (More images)		Bohemia; 50.8638°N 0.5588°E	Methodist	–	The roots of Methodism in the Bohemia suburb can be traced to 1876, and four years later land was bought for the erection of a church. A school chapel elsewhere sufficed until 1891, when Philip Tree started building his Decorated Gothic-style design. Park Road Methodist Church, prominent on its corner site with its tower and stone spire, opened the following year and was registered for marriages in August 1893. In 2016 the members of the former Hollington Methodist Church (closed in August that year) joined this church, and with effect from 1 September 2016 its name was changed from Park Road Methodist Church to St Leonards-on-Sea Methodist Church.	
Hastings Citadel (More images)		Hastings; 50.8585°N 0.5819°E	Salvation Army	–	The 1880s brick building, registered for marriages in December 1932 and enlarged in 1937, has always been known as the "Iron Fort" locally. It was the focus of anti-Salvation Army riots as soon as it was founded: youths picked up on the ill-feeling displayed in other Sussex towns and formed their own "Skeleton Army" to attack the building and its members.	
Hastings Temple (More images)		Ore; 50.8712°N 0.6069°E	Salvation Army	–	The Salvation Army established their second place of worship in Hastings in 1935, although it was not registered for marriages until September 1956. The small white-painted building opened as the Cynthia Cinema (advertised as "the cheapest, the cosiest and the best") in June 1913, but it lasted just ten years and was later used to store furniture.	
Clive Vale United Reformed Church (More images)		Clive Vale; 50.8660°N 0.6045°E	United Reformed Church	–	Founded as a Congregational church in 1887, this small red-brick chapel by Thomas Elworthy is in the Early English style and is distinguished by the unusual feature of a side porch.	
St Luke's United Reformed Church (More images)		Silverhill; 50.8695°N 0.5572°E	United Reformed Church	–	One of southeast England's first English Presbyterian churches was founded in 1853 when Silverhill was no more than a farm and some cottages. Henry Carpenter built a permanent church of stone in 1857, which grew rapidly: a tower and spire were built in 1865, and a chancel in 1909. The Great Storm of 1987 ripped off the spire, which has been replaced by a pyramidal cap. Under the name Silverhill Presbyterian Church it was registered for marriages in April 1871.	
Bethel Full Gospel Church Centre		Halton; 50.8684°N 0.6003°E	Assemblies of God	–	This Pentecostal group took over the former St Mary-of-the-Castle Church in Pelham Crescent in 1970, but did not have enough money to maintain the listed building. Hastings Borough Council later bought the building, and a new church centre was established on Priory Road in Halton. Until 1989 the building was registered as the Halton Baptist Mission Hall; then King's Church used it until 2001. The present congregation registered it in February 2003.	
Christ Apostolic Church Hastings (More images)		Ore; 50.8748°N 0.6063°E	Christ Apostolic Church	–	This small church on the Ore–Baldslow Road (The Ridge) was originally St Helen's Methodist Church. It probably dates from 1877, although the date on its foundation stone is now illegible and it was not registered for marriages until June 1923. The white-painted exterior hides red-brick walls. The windows are lancets. The slope of the land conceals a hall beneath the church. The chapel was closed in September 2016 and the Methodist congregation has since met at Ore Community Centre nearby. Christ Apostolic Church Hastings was founded in March 2008 and re-registered the chapel for its use in June 2021.	
Elim Church Centre (More images)		Blacklands; 50.8693°N 0.5834°E	Elim Pentecostal	–	The congregation, established in the 1950s, worshipped at a hall in the centre of Hastings until the 1980s, when they acquired a site on Elphinstone Avenue in Blacklands and built a permanent church. It was registered for worship and for marriages in August 1981.	
St Mary Magdalene's Church (More images)		St Leonards-on-Sea; 50.8532°N 0.5650°E	Greek Orthodox	II	This Anglican church of 1852, on a prominent sloping corner site (a characteristic feature of churches in Hastings and St Leonards-on-Sea), was one of Frederick Marrable's early works. The Decorated Gothic-style stone church has a tall turreted corner tower, added in 1872. Declared redundant by the Diocese of Chichester on 17 December 1980, it was sold to the Greek Orthodox Church and continues in use under the same dedication. It was registered for worship and for marriages in June 1998.	
Church of Jesus Christ of Latter-day Saints (More images)		Silverhill Park; 50.8808°N 0.5530°E	Latter-day Saint	–	Situated on Ledsham Avenue just off the main road to Battle, this meetinghouse is used by the Hastings Ward of the Maidstone Stake of the Church of Jesus Christ of Latter-day Saints. It was registered for marriages in February 1990.	
Masjid al-Haq (More images)		St Leonards-on-Sea; 50.8523°N 0.5574°E	Muslim	–	James Burton's plans for his St Leonards-on-Sea development included Mercatoria, an inland marketplace. This use did not last long, and in 1847 his son Decimus built a National School on the site. It was the area's only school for the next 26 years, and it was still used until a much larger building was opened elsewhere in the town in 1978. The East Sussex Islamic Association bought the building in the mid-1980s and converted it into a mosque.	
His Place Church (Robertson Street United Reformed Church) (More images)		Hastings; 50.8555°N 0.5776°E	Pentecostal	II	Henry Ward's church of 1884–85 (but registered for marriages in April 1887) was built for the Congregational community in the town centre and replaced a Lombardo-Gothic predecessor of 1856 which stood on the same site. The Robertson Street frontage of Ward's tall Neoclassical/Renaissance building is surrounded by shops, but the façade on Cambridge Road is fully visible and spans five bays. The walls are of dark stone. Charles New, the most important figure in Hastings' Congregationalist community, was instrumental in getting the new church funded and built. The final service was held on 30 December 2012, and the building is now occupied by His Place Church, a Pentecostal group (who took ownership in November 2013), and the Opus Theatre.	
Meeting Hall (More images)		Hollington; 50.8856°N 0.5445°E	Plymouth Brethren Christian Church	–	This Brethren meeting room was registered for marriages in worship in January 1972 and for marriages in October 1998.	
Friends Meeting House (More images)		Hastings; 50.8581°N 0.5815°E	Quaker	–	Quakers in the Hastings area meet at this Renaissance-style building on South Terrace in the town centre. It was founded in 1864 and designed by William Beck in 1864–65. John Horniman, a Quaker tea trader who patented a new tea-packing process, donated some of the £1,420 cost of the meeting house, which opened on 12 January 1866. The altered front is stuccoed.	
Hastings Seventh-Day Adventist Community Church (More images)		Ore; 50.8725°N 0.6096°E	Seventh-day Adventist	–	This small building used by the Seventh-day Adventist community of Hastings stands on the road to Fairlight. It was registered as a place of worship in April 1968.	
Christian Spiritualist Church (More images)		Hastings; 50.8546°N 0.5762°E	Spiritualist	–	One of several Spiritualist churches in Sussex, this is based in buildings at Claremont, facing the sea near Holy Trinity Church. It was registered for marriages in August 1944.	
Ebenezer Baptist Church (More images)		Silverhill; 50.8672°N 0.5545°E	Strict Baptist	–	This small 1950s brick building on the Ponswood industrial estate was originally a Gospel Hall used by Plymouth Brethren, who registered it as the Ponswood Road Room in 1954. It is now aligned with the Gospel Standard Baptist movement.	
Hastings Unitarian Church (More images)		Hastings; 50.8582°N 0.5812°E	Unitarian	–	Governor of Hong Kong, hyperpolyglot and Unitarian John Bowring founded this church on South Terrace in May 1868. The town's Unitarian community formed eight years earlier and previously met in a music hall and an inn. The building has a painted stucco façade and is a late example of Neoclassical architecture. A licence to solemnise marriages was granted in December 1872.	

== Former places of worship ==
Former places of worship
Name	Image	Location	Denomination/ Affiliation	Grade	Notes	Refs
All Souls Church (More images)		Clive Vale; 50.8673°N 0.6069°E	Anglican	II*	Arthur Blomfield built Clive Vale's Anglican church in a plain red-brick style in 1890. Its height is emphasised by the clerestory with triple lancet windows, some with stained glass by Heaton, Butler and Bayne. An elaborate reredos was added in 1897. The final service was on 4 November 2007, and the Diocese of Chichester declared it redundant on 15 February 2008.	
St Mary-in-the-Castle Church (More images)		Hastings; 50.8556°N 0.5846°E	Anglican	II*	The successor to an 11th-century collegiate church inside Hastings Castle, this Classical stuccoed church with Ionic columns formed the centrepiece of Joseph Kay's Pelham Crescent residential development on the seafront. Springs flowed from the cliff behind into a total immersion baptismal pool—rare in an Anglican church. It closed in 1970 and is now an arts centre.	
St Helen's Church (original building) (More images)		St Helen's; 50.8796°N 0.5864°E	Anglican	II	The ruins of Ore's original parish church are in an overgrown wood, but the tower, nave and chancel walls and some windows can still be seen. The tower is 12th-century, and other surviving fabric is 14th- and 15th-century. Traces of an Easter Sepulchre remain as well. The church was damp, inconveniently sited and too small for the growing district, so the new St Helen's Church was built nearby in 1869.	
St Leonard's Church (More images)		St Leonards-on-Sea; 50.8513°N 0.5514°E	Anglican	II	James Burton, the founder of St Leonards-on-Sea, built a seafront church for the new town in 1837. Five years later, the cliff behind collapsed and crushed the chancel; and in 1944 a freakish direct hit from a V-1 flying bomb, damaged by anti-aircraft fire, brought the whole church down. Giles and Adrian Gilbert Scott's neo-Gothic pale brick and stone design, executed in eight years from 1953, replaced it.	
St Nicholas' Church (Fishermen's Church) (More images)		Rock-a-Nore; 50.8561°N 0.5952°E	Anglican	II	The rector of St Clement's Church founded this small, plain stone church in 1854 on The Stade at Rock-a-Nore in an attempt to reach out to the town's fishermen, who attended church irregularly. The first service took place on 26 March that year. It was requisitioned and damaged in World War II, closed and bought by a trust who converted it into a fishing museum, which opened in 1956.	
Christ Church (original building) (More images)		St Leonards-on-Sea; 50.8535°N 0.5596°E	Anglican	–	Built in 1860 as a working-class church, this Early English-style building used sandstone from an adjacent quarry, which then became the site of the new Christ Church in 1875. The original church then became the parish hall, hosted some activities for the nearby Christ Church School and was later turned into a theological centre.	
St Anne's Church (More images)		Hollington; 50.8723°N 0.5434°E	Anglican	–	The interwar and postwar expansion of Hollington, which by the 1960s had become Hastings' largest council estate, led to improved church provision in the form of this small flint and brick building, founded in 1956 and built over several years by the Brighton firm of Denman & Sons. It was in the parish of Church in the Wood. It had closed by 2022, when a planning application was raised for its demolition and replacement with houses. This application was unsuccessful, and by early 2025 several others had been refused.	
St Ethelburga's Mission Hall (More images)		Glyne Gap, Bulverhythe; 50.8477°N 0.5133°E	Anglican	–	St Ethelburga's Church established a mission chapel and church hall at nearby Glyne Gap in 1932. A loan from the Board of Charity Commissioners in 1938 helped to fund it. The building, on the Bexhill Road, was acquired for use as a nursery school in 1997.	
St Wilfrid's Church (More images)		St Leonards-on-Sea; 50.8542°N 0.5584°E	Anglican	–	This was always an unparished mission church, and is no longer in religious use. For many years after its closure it housed the Chichester Diocesan Association for the Deaf. The Classical-style building is gabled, stuccoed and has a porch and pediment, and dates from the mid-1860s.	
Sandown Mission Hall (More images)		Ore; 50.8707°N 0.6038°E	Anglican	–	The mission occupied a tin tabernacle at the corner of School Road and Sandown Road in Ore. It was built in late 1894 and formally opened on 5 December 1894 by Sir James Colquhoun, 5th Baronet. Initially run by a Mrs Holt, from 27 September 1902 it was taken over and run by nearby Christ Church. A newspaper report in 1933 described a recreation room for unemployed people having opened at the hall, and five years later a "new clubroom" was provided. The building was later used as an overflow classroom for a nearby primary school, but this ceased in July 1952.	
Bohemia Primitive Methodist Chapel (More images)		Bohemia; 50.8630°N 0.5611°E	Methodist	–	This small Italianate chapel was built in the late 19th century for the Primitive Methodist community. A schoolroom was built during improvement work in 1895. It closed in 1939 and became Newgate Hall, which now houses a British Red Cross office.	
Bourne Street Wesleyan Methodist Church (More images)		Old Town; 50.8570°N 0.5927°E	Methodist	–	The popular Hastings Theatre, in the heart of the Old Town, was sold to the Methodist community in 1834 after nine years of use. They demolished the Neoclassical structure in 1939 in favour of a plain red-brick building, which opened the following year. Its registration for worship was cancelled in December 1988. After closure it was renamed Bourne Hall and initially housed a café and arts centre, but in 2013 it was converted into apartments, retaining the Bourne Hall name.	
Hollington Methodist Church (More images)		Hollington; 50.8782°N 0.5496°E	Methodist	–	This was the fourth Methodist place of worship in Hollington: a cottage was used from 1823, a small chapel superseded it two years later and a larger building was provided in 1835. The building used by the congregation until its permanent closure in August 2016 dated from 1887 and survived bomb, storm and fire damage. The plain brick and stone church, which had been registered for marriages in March 1922, had arched windows. The members of Hollington Methodist Church joined the Park Road Methodist Church (now called St Leonards-on-Sea Methodist Church) at Bohemia.	
St Leonards Methodist Church (More images)		St Leonards-on-Sea; 50.8522°N 0.5589°E	Methodist	–	J. Weir's Gothic Revival-style stone church of 1901, with a large tower topped by a spire, replaced an 1836 building on the same site. This was extended in 1862 but burnt down in 1900. The South East District of the Methodist Church authorised the closure of the church in April 2008, although its marriage registration had already been cancelled in October 2005.	
St Michael's Chapel (Holy Child Jesus Convent)		St Leonards-on-Sea; 50.8545°N 0.5667°E	Roman Catholic	II*	The convent was founded in about 1846, and Augustus Pugin started building this chapel in its grounds in 1848. His son Edward completed it. It was used (under the dedication St Michael and All Angels Church) for public Roman Catholic worship until 1868, when arguments over its ownership led to a new church being founded. The Gothic Revival building reverted to convent chapel status, and closed with the rest of the convent in 1974.	
Church of the Holy Apostles (More images)		Ore; 50.8732°N 0.6103°E	Roman Catholic	–	This short-lived church was last listed in the Roman Catholic Diocese of Arundel and Brighton's annual directories in 1994, and in April of that year a planning application to convert the building into a doctor's surgery was approved. Its registration for worship, granted in February 1963, was formally cancelled in January 1998.	
Church of the Holy Ghost (More images)		Bulverhythe; 50.8514°N 0.5260°E	Roman Catholic	–	Designed by B. Stevens and Partners, architects from Eastbourne, this church cost £40,000 and opened in 1964. It was registered for marriages in 1965 and was last used in 1988; it was later sold and is now a car parts centre. Early photographs show a deep porch along the whole façade.	
Our Lady of Missions Convent Chapel (More images)		Clive Vale; 50.8639°N 0.5980°E	Roman Catholic	–	Like St Michael's Chapel at St Leonards-on-Sea, this convent chapel was used for public Roman Catholic worship for a time (under the name St Joseph's Chapel). John Hicks designed the stuccoed building in the Baroque style in 1924; the convent was founded in 1903 on the site of Frederick North MP's house. It is now the centrepiece of a sheltered housing complex.	
Gospel Mission Hall (More images)		St Leonards-on-Sea; 50.8527°N 0.5576°E	Non-denominational	–	This building on Kenilworth Road was registered for marriages between March 1920 and June 1982. It was built as a Primitive Methodist chapel in 1895 to the design of Philip Tree, in a distinctive style which combined elements of Arts and Crafts and Gothic Revival architecture.	
Mission Chapel (More images)		Ore; 50.8750°N 0.6077°E	Non-denominational	–	A mission hall on Grove Road in the Redlake area of Ore was recorded on maps of various ages and by The London Gazette as a registered place of worship between May 1893 and April 1971, when its certification was cancelled.	
Railway Mission Hall (More images)		Hastings; 50.8570°N 0.5836°E	Non-denominational	–	Tucked into one of the steep, staircase-flanked twittens that characterise inner Hastings, this chapel was built by the Railway Mission in 1891 to serve the religious needs of the town's railway workers. It later became the parish hall of St Mary-in-the-Castle Church, but is now disused. The red brick and stone building is in the Perpendicular Gothic style.	
Bulverhythe United Reformed Church (More images)		Bulverhythe; 50.8518°N 0.5293°E	United Reformed Church	–	J. Elworthy's Congregational mission church of 1895 was registered for marriages as Bulverhythe Congregational Mission Church in August 1936. Under its final name its registration was cancelled in September 1978. The Renaissance-style hall, of red brick with stuccoed dressings, is now called Hastleon Hall and is owned by an amateur dramatics group.	
St Mark's United Reformed Church (More images)		Blacklands; 50.8660°N 0.5841°E	United Reformed Church	–	According to Sussex church historian Robert Elleray, the original Congregational church on this site, built in 1879, was architect Thomas Elworthy's chef d'œuvre. It had a tower, spire and terracotta-edged red brickwork, but was demolished in 1972 to make way for a development of 46 flats with a church integrated into the ground floor. This opened on 1 October 1975 and was registered for worship and for marriages the following month. Membership had declined to five people by 2020, and the church was closed on 26 July of that year.	
First Church of Christ, Scientist, Hastings and St Leonards-on-Sea (More images)		Silverhill; 50.8671°N 0.5548°E	Christian Scientist	–	Christian Scientists in the borough worshipped in various premises, including part of a building in Cornwallis Gardens between 1946 and 1970, until a permanent church was built on Sedlescombe Road South. It was registered for worship between April 1970 and March 1996. It was converted into offices; permission to demolish the building was refused in 2018.	
St Leonards-on-Sea Congregational Church (More images)		St Leonards-on-Sea; 50.8548°N 0.5591°E	Congregational Federation	II	To Robert Elleray, this is "one of the finest Nonconformist buildings in Sussex", but it lost its tall copper spire in the Great Storm of 1987 and was finally closed in 2008 after six years of disuse. The firm of Habershon and Brock designed it in 1863 for its Congregationalist founder James Griffin, and it was registered for marriages in June 1866. The sandstone for it was quarried at Ore.	
The Tabernacle (More images)		Hastings; 50.8555°N 0.5771°E	Evangelical	–	The chapel was built in the town centre in 1854 for the ministry of Charles Pavey, an Independent Calvinistic preacher. It was registered for marriages in April 1856. By the 1970s it had become a Free Evangelical church, and the interior fittings were reordered to cater for the different form of worship. The exterior is unchanged, however: the yellow-brick and stone building has a steeply gabled porch set below five tall lancet windows. In November 2018 the building was taken on by the Church Growth Trust with the aim of planting a new Evangelical church into it, but instead the nearby Holy Trinity Church purchased it for use as a community hall, HTH Hall.	
Meeting Room		St Leonards-on-Sea; 50.8519°N 0.5601°E	Exclusive Brethren	–	This was in use by Brethren from October 1934, when it was registered for worship, until the Ponswood Road Room in Silverhill replaced it in January 1954. It stood on Market Passage behind Norman Road.	
Kingdom Hall (More images)		St Leonards-on-Sea; 50.8552°N 0.5559°E	Jehovah's Witnesses	–	This Kingdom Hall was latterly used by the St Leonards-on-Sea Congregation of Jehovah's Witnesses. The building was registered for marriages in May 1976 but is no longer in religious use. Attendances grew in 1998 when members of the Halton Kingdom Hall in St George's Road were displaced: their building was demolished to make way for Southern Water's large cross-town drainage tunnel.	
Stonefield Gospel Hall (More images)		Hastings; 50.8572°N 0.5838°E	Open Brethren	–	This Gospel hall, no longer in religious use, stands on Stonefield Road and was registered for marriages in 1947.	
Bethel Full Gospel Church		Halton; 50.8649°N 0.5909°E	Pentecostal	–	This Pentecostal group used this late 19th-century building, in the middle of a terrace of houses on St George's Road, before moving to Priory Road in Halton. It was registered for worship and for marriages between November 1971 and October 2001.	
St Mary's Chapel (More images)		Bulverhythe; 50.8469°N 0.5102°E	Pre-Reformation	II	Norman-era stones were incorporated into the rebuilt 13th-century parish church of Bulverhythe, which was a prebend of the original St Mary-in-the-Castle Church. The last record of worship taking place in the building was in 1372, after which it became derelict and collapsed. Parts of the flint and stone walls and foundations of the chancel survive. The parish existed in name only until the 19th century.	
Hastings Spiritualist Brotherhood Church (More images)		Hastings; 50.8575°N 0.5832°E	Spiritualist	–	This church, on Portland Place in central Hastings, was part of the Spiritualists' National Union. It was registered for worship in June 1963 and for marriages in January 1971, but has now closed: planning permission for residential conversion was granted in April 2015.	
Ebenezer Particular Baptist Chapel (More images)		Old Town; 50.8585°N 0.5961°E	Strict Baptist	II	Successor to a Strict Baptist chapel called Cow Lodge near the beach at Rock-a-Nore, this chapel was founded nearby in 1817 by a member of its congregation. It grew in popularity throughout the 19th century, and regular extensions were made; but it closed by the end of the 20th century and has been converted into a house. The Neoclassical structure retains its stuccoed façade, pilasters, pediment and cornice.	

== See also ==
- Media related to Places of worship in Hastings at Wikimedia Commons
- List of demolished places of worship in East Sussex

== Bibliography ==
- Anon. (1975). Hastings & St Leonards Official Guide 1975. Hastings: Hastings Borough Council Tourism and Recreation Department.
- Antram, Nicholas; Pevsner, Nikolaus (2013). Sussex: East with Brighton and Hove. The Buildings of England. London: Yale University Press. ISBN 978-0-300-18473-0.
- Beevers, David; Marks, Richard; Roles, John (1989). Sussex Churches and Chapels. Brighton: The Royal Pavilion, Art Gallery and Museums. ISBN 0-948723-11-4.
- Brooks, Ken (2004). Around Hastings Then and Now. St Leonards-on-Sea: Ken Brooks. ISBN 0-9540513-2-7.
- Buckle, Alan G. (2003). An Independent Chapel: The Story of St Luke's in Silverhill 1853–2003. Hastings: Hastings Local History Group.
- Diocese of Arundel and Brighton (1988). A&B Diocesan Directory 1988. Hove: Roman Catholic Diocese of Arundel and Brighton.
- Diocese of Arundel and Brighton (1994). A&B Diocesan Directory 1994. Hove: Roman Catholic Diocese of Arundel and Brighton.
- Diocese of Arundel and Brighton (2020). Diocese of Arundel & Brighton Catholic Directory 2020. Purley: Roman Catholic Diocese of Arundel and Brighton.
- Elleray, D. Robert (1979). Hastings: a Pictorial History. Chichester: Phillimore & Co. ISBN 0-85033-324-5.
- Elleray, D. Robert (1981). The Victorian Churches of Sussex. Chichester: Phillimore & Co. Ltd. ISBN 0-85033-378-4.
- Elleray, D. Robert (2004). Sussex Places of Worship. Worthing: Optimus Books. ISBN 0-9533132-7-1.
- Foord, Keith (2017). Methodism in Eastern Sussex 1756–2017 (PDF). Battle and District Historical Society Collectanea: Topic F (Religion, General, Conformist, Non-Conformist and Roman Catholic), Item 3.2. Battle: Battle and District Historical Society. Archived (PDF) from the original on 21 November 2020.
- Haines, Gavin (1997). Hastings & St Leonards. Britain in Old Photographs. Stroud: Sutton Publishing. ISBN 0-7509-1355-X.
- Hastings Local History Group (2002). Hastings Voices (2nd ed.). Hastings: Hastings Local History Workshop. ISBN 0-9529766-4-1.
- Manwaring Baines, J. (1990) [1956]. Burton's St Leonards (2nd ed.). Hastings: Hastings Museum.
- Marchant, Rex (1997). Hastings Past. Chichester: Phillimore & Co. ISBN 1-86077-046-0.
- Marchant, Rex (2004). Hastings: a History and Celebration. Teffont: Frith Book Co Ltd. ISBN 1-904938-31-0.
- Methodist Church of Great Britain (1947). Methodist Church Buildings: Statistical Returns including Seating Accommodation as at July 1st, 1940 (PDF). Manchester: The Department for Chapel Affairs. (Available online in 14 parts; Guide to abbreviations on page 6)
- Nairn, Ian; Pevsner, Nikolaus (1965). The Buildings of England: Sussex. Harmondsworth: Penguin Books. ISBN 0-14-071028-0.
- Salter, Mike (2000). The Old Parish Churches of Sussex. Malvern: Folly Publications. ISBN 1-871731-40-2.
- Salzman, L.F., ed. (1973) [1937]. A History of Sussex. The Victoria Histories of the Counties of England. Vol. 9. Folkestone: Dawsons of Pall Mall (originally Oxford: Oxford University Press). ISBN 0-7129-0590-1.
- s.n. (June 1933). A List of Some Assemblies of the British Isles. London: Pickering & Inglis.
- s.n. (June 1935). List of Meetings – June 1935. London: Pickering & Inglis.
- Stell, Christopher (2002). Nonconformist Chapels and Meeting-houses in Eastern England. Swindon: English Heritage. ISBN 1-873592-50-7.
- Thornton, David (1987). Hastings: a Living History. Hastings: The Hastings Publishing Co. ISBN 0-9512201-0-1.
- Trowbridge, W.H. (1953). List of Meetings – 1953. Kingston-upon-Thames: The Stow Hill Bible and Tract Depot.
- Various authors (2003) [1991]. Hollington: The Village Past and Present (2nd ed.). Hastings: Hastings Local History Group.
- Vigar, John E. (1986). Exploring Sussex Churches. Rainham: Meresborough Books. ISBN 0-948193-09-3.
- Wales, Tony (1998). Hastings. The Archive Photographs Series. Chalford: Chalford Publishing Co. ISBN 0-7524-1109-8.
- Whiteman, Ken; Whiteman, Joyce (1998). Ancient Churches of Sussex. Seaford: S.B. Publications. ISBN 1-85770-154-2.
