= Church in the Wood, Hollington =

Church in the Wood
- St Leonard's Church
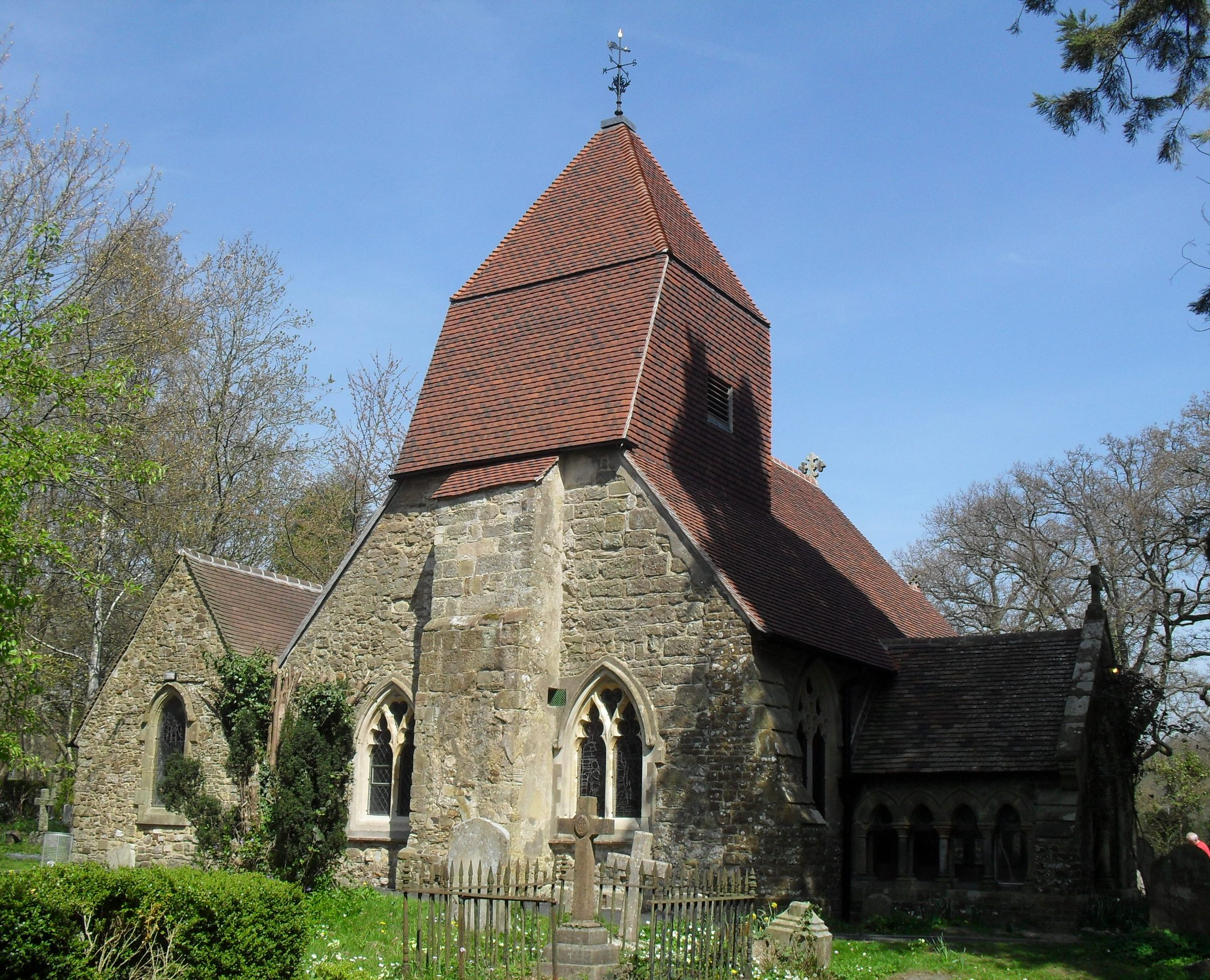
- The church from the south
- Church in the Wood
- 50.8743°N 0.5380°E
- Location: Church in the Wood Lane, Hollington, Hastings, East Sussex TN38 9PB
- Country: England
- Denomination: Church of England
- Website: www.stleonardsandstannes.org.uk

History
- Former name: St Rumbold's Church
- Status: Parish church
- Founded: 11th century
- Dedication: St Leonard

Architecture
- Functional status: Active
- Heritage designation: Grade II
- Designated: 19 January 1951
- Style: Early English Gothic

Administration
- Province: Canterbury
- Diocese: Chichester
- Archdeaconry: Hastings
- Deanery: Rural Deanery of Hastings
- Parish: Hollington: St Leonard and St Anne

Church in the Wood, officially known as St Leonard's Church and originally as St Rumbold's Church, is an Anglican church in the Hollington area of the town and borough of Hastings, one of six local government districts in the English county of East Sussex. Although Hollington is now a large suburb, consisting mostly of postwar residential development, the church has stood in isolation in the middle of an ancient wood since it was founded in the 13th century—almost certainly as the successor to an 11th-century chapel. Restoration work in the Victorian era has given the Early English Gothic-style building its present appearance, but some medieval work remains. Legends and miraculous events have been associated with the church, and its secluded situation has been praised by writers including Charles Lamb. The church is a Grade II Listed building.

== History ==
The manor of Hollington (also spelt Horintune, Holintun, Horintone, Halinton and Halyngtone early in its existence) existed at the time of the Domesday survey in 1086: before the Norman conquest of England the land was held by Godwin, Earl of Wessex and another lord, Alstan, and amounted to 4½ hides. Afterwards it passed to Robert, Count of Eu. The manor house and village (a scattered, mostly rural settlement rather than a nucleated village) were 2.5 miles (4.0 km) northwest of Hastings and a similar distance north of St Leonards-on-Sea on a ridge of high land.

No chapel or church was mentioned in the Domesday survey, but the will of a later Count of Eu written in 1139 states that one existed on the present site in 1090, suggesting possible pre-Norman origins. There were two other places of worship in the parish at the time—a church in the manor of Filsham, and another chapel at Wilting. Filsham was the more important manor, but its church (and the chapel at Wilting) had disappeared by the time Pope Nicholas IV ordered a census of all places of worship for taxation purposes in 1291. (Wilting's probably disappeared in the early 12th century, although a field and a wood in the area still bear the chapel's name.) A suggested reason for the isolation of the chapel—which was about 0.5 miles (0.80 km) from the nearest house until after World War II—was that the ownership of the manor transferred at an early date to the Lord of the manor of nearby Crowhurst, who abandoned Hollington's manor house and the surrounding area because they were superfluous. The chapel, standing nearby, was then the only building still in use, and a wood grew up around it.

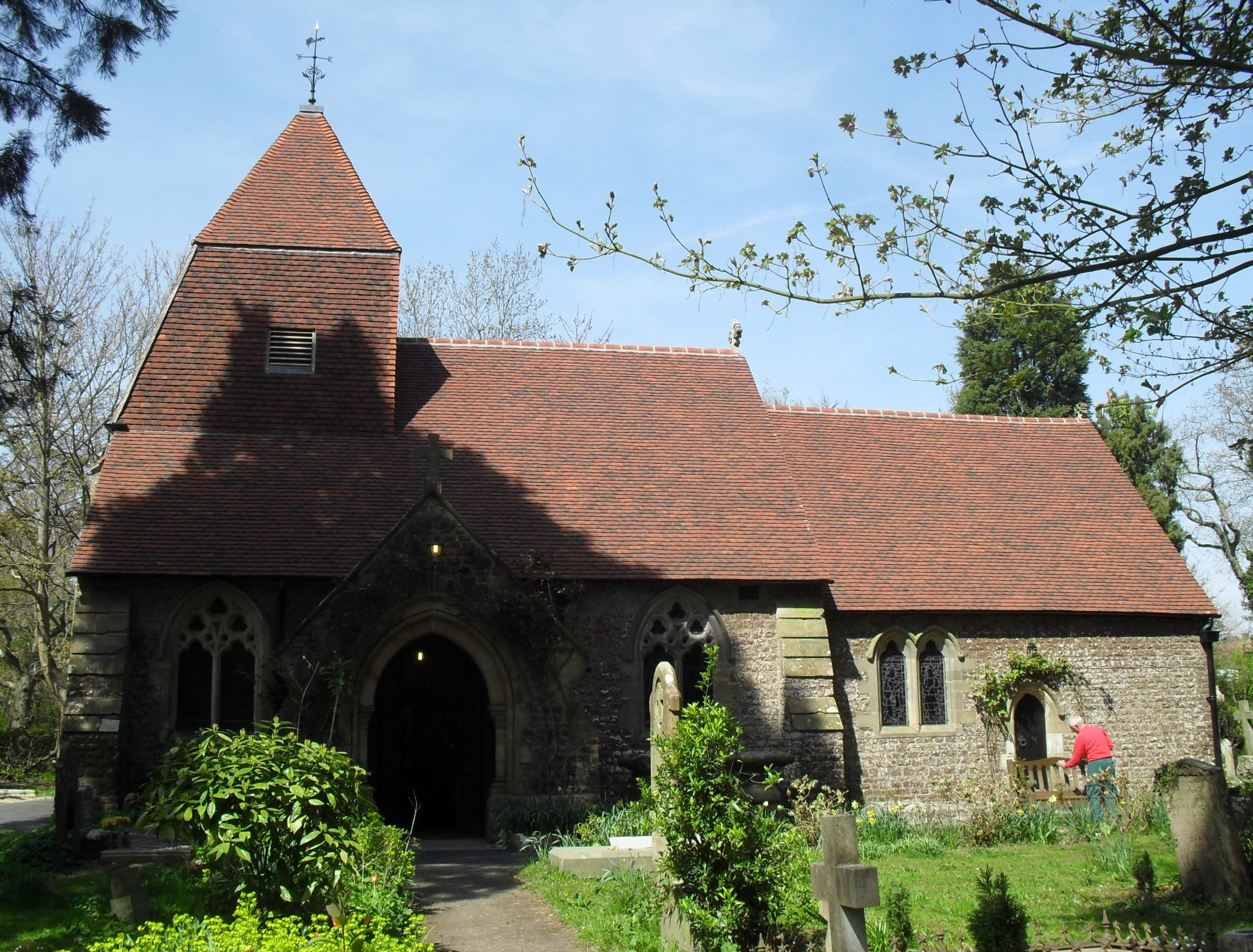
The chancel is lower than the nave, and the tower has a tiled pyramidal cap.

The chapel is known to have been replaced by a church in the mid-13th century. The first mention of a vicar was in 1288, but the first whose name has been recorded was John de Levenyngton, who moved to All Saints Church in Hastings Old Town in 1344.

The dedication to St Leonard came about over the course of many years by mistaken association with a former church of that dedication. In 1291, a St Leonard's Church was one of seven medieval churches recorded in Hastings, along with St Margaret's, St Michael's, St Peter's, St Andrew's, St Clement's and All Saints. Only the last two survive in the 21st century, and St Leonard's Church—situated near Norman Road in present-day St Leonards-on-Sea—was lost in the early 15th century (no later than 1428). Thereafter, it became a "free chapel" in Hollington's parish, and its former parishioners travelled to Hollington to worship. The original dedication of Church in the Wood, first recorded in 1562, was to St Rumbold. Gradually over the next 150 years, the name "St Leonard's Church" began to be applied to it; the first record of this was in 1712. From the mid-19th century, the epithet "Church in the Wood" gained popularity after James Burton founded a new St Leonard's Church in the centre of his St Leonards-on-Sea resort and a second church (St John the Evangelist's) was established in Hollington.

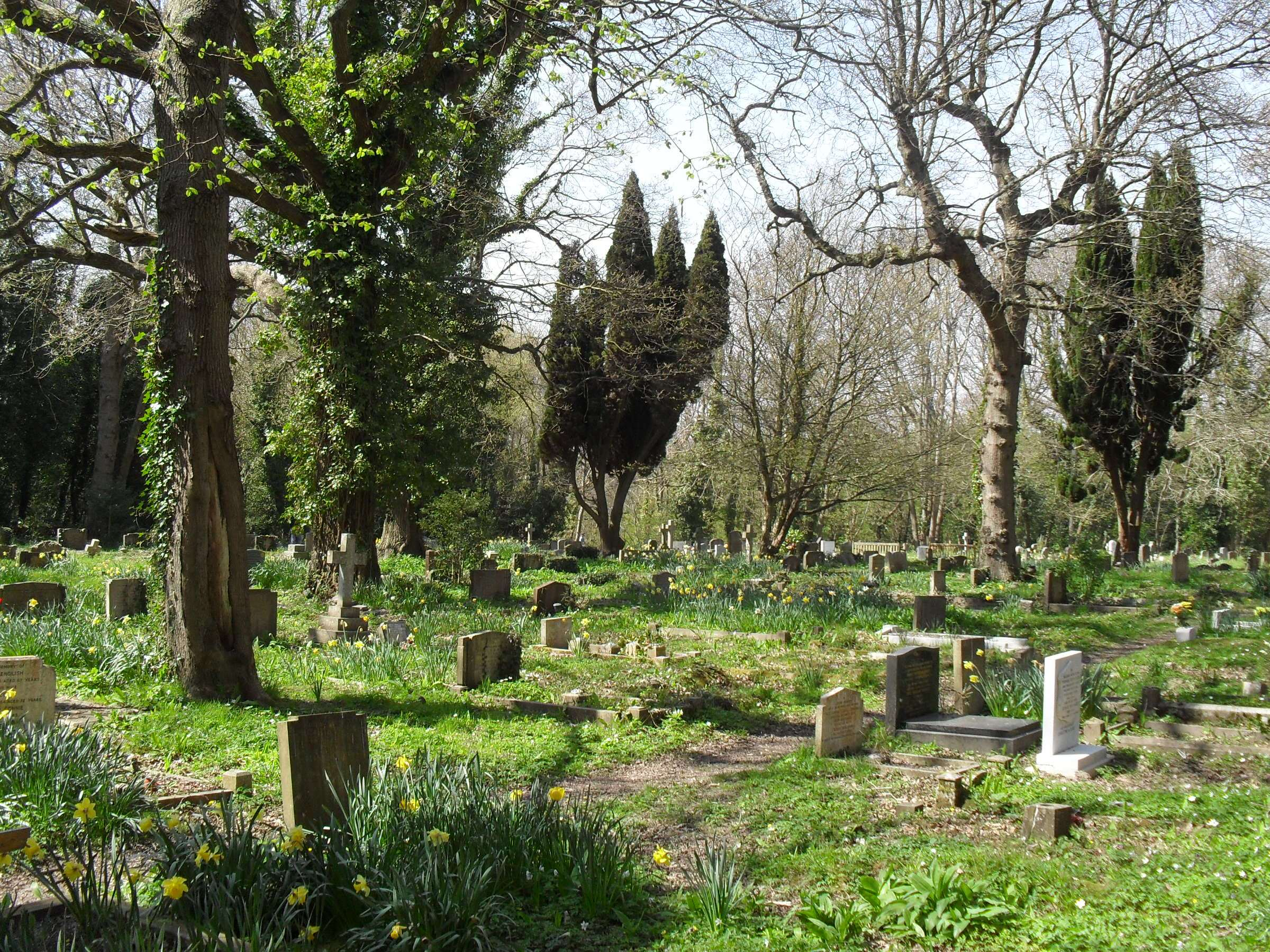
The church has a large, secluded graveyard.

The church continued to serve the parish despite its isolation, but it declined into a poor structural state by the mid-19th century: in 1834 it was described as "in such a general state of decay as to make any attempt to repair it inadvisable". Sir Charles Montolieu Lamb (no relation to the writer Charles Lamb), who lived at Beauport Park, a nearby mansion, wanted the church to be closed and a replacement built nearer his land, but parishioners demanded that the ancient church be repaired instead. Work started in 1847 and continued for nearly 20 years: the church closed for a time in 1861 while repairs were made, then Matilda Dampner paid for a complete restoration in 1865 to commemorate her parents. The church closed again while this was carried out, and reopened in 1866. The renovation was so substantial that it gave the church a mostly Victorian appearance, and only a few fragments of Norman-era fabric remained.

Church in the Wood's parish was reduced in size in 1870 when some of its territory was given to the newly built St John the Evangelist's Church. Hollington became part of the Borough of Hastings in 1897. After this, little change occurred in the church itself, although a lychgate was built at the entrance to the churchyard in 1937, general repairs were made in 1964 and an extension was added in 1977 to form a parish room and vestry. The churchyard is large and has been used for centuries—the first recorded burial took place in 1606, and the oldest surviving gravestone dates from 1678—and it is the last remaining private burial ground in the Borough of Hastings.

Hollington grew substantially in the 19th and 20th centuries, in line with the rest of Hastings. The population was 338 in 1831, 3,677 in 1931 and about 7,500 in 1939. Nevertheless, it retained its village character until the 1960s, when the borough council selected it as the site for a large council estate. The expansion of the 1920s and 1930s had been driven by council housing, and in 1962 the council proposed to continue and extend this scheme by demolishing much of the old village and laying out a large housing estate. More private and council housing has since been added, and Hollington has now lost its rural setting. The ancient woodland around the church has been preserved, though, and is one of six nature reserves in the borough of Hastings.

== Architecture ==
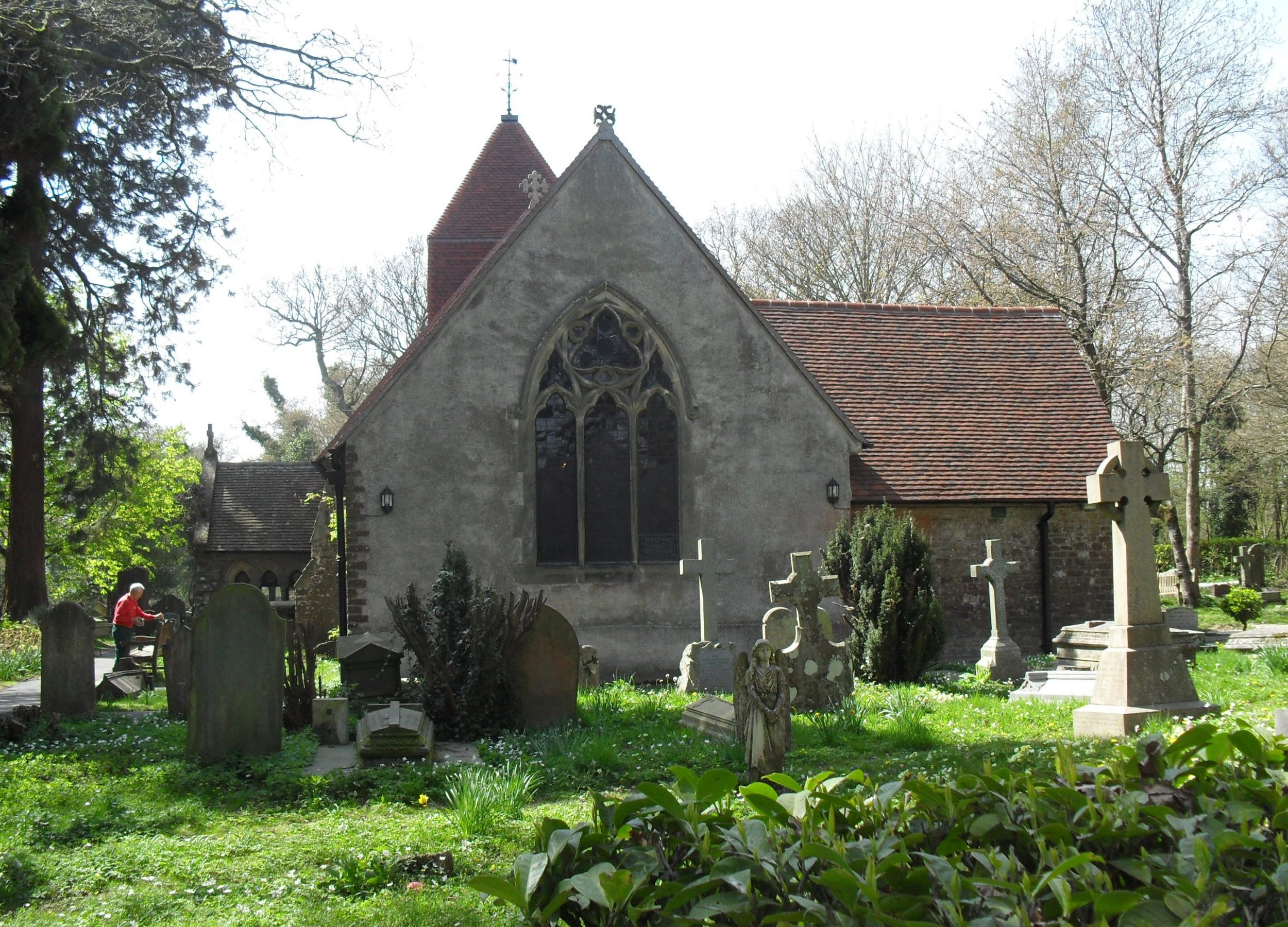
The east end has a stained glass window by Jean-Baptiste Capronnier.

The 19th-century restoration of Church in the Wood defines its present appearance. The only surviving work from the medieval era is in the west and north walls of the nave and in the tower, where some stonework, timbers and an ancient bell survive. The church is built of stone rubble, the roof is tiled, and the pyramid-shaped cap on the tower is tile-hung; it was originally weatherboarded. The bell, cast between 1371 and 1392, is the oldest in Hastings and one of the oldest in Sussex.

The plan includes a nave of three bays, a chancel (rebuilt in 1865 at a lower height, and having two bays), an ornate chancel arch (added at the same time), a low two-stage bell tower at the west end, a vestry, a porch and a modern parish hall. The stone used is mostly locally quarried bluestone with some dressings of Bath and Caen stone.

The architectural style is Early English Gothic. The east window is a three-light lancet with tracery in the Decorated Gothic style. Jean-Baptiste Capronnier added a stained glass depiction of the Resurrection to it in 1873. Faith and Hope are depicted in an 1886 window in the south side, and Charity is shown in a north-wall window of 1875. These were probably by the Clayton and Bell firm.

== Legends and portrayals ==
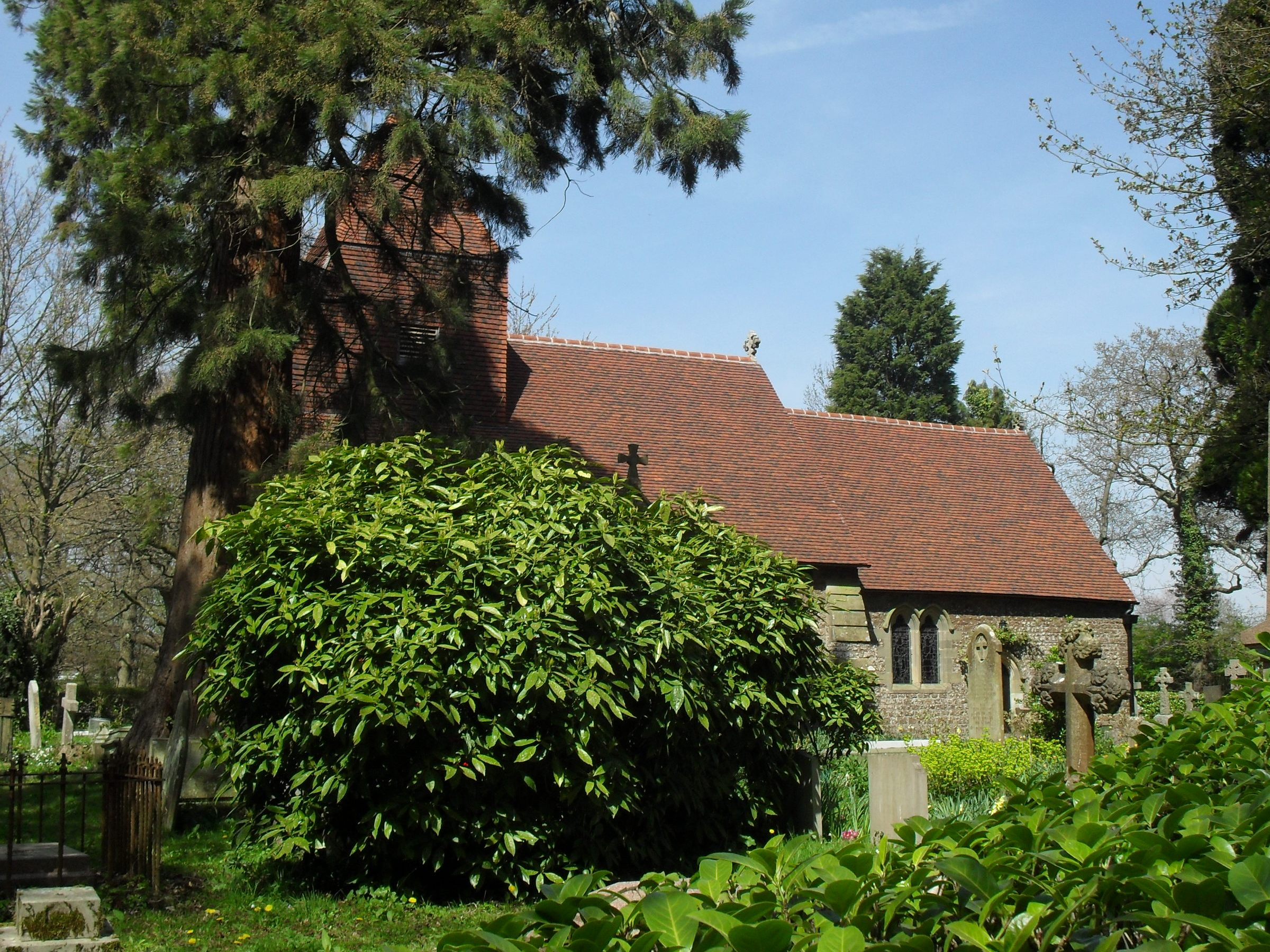
Church in the Wood's seclusion has given rise to stories and legends.

The location of Church in the Wood is explained by a story (also attributed in various forms to other churches in Sussex) involving a battle between the Devil and the builders. Every night, the work carried out the previous day would be destroyed and the materials taken away. A voice spoke to the builders, claiming that the site belonged to the Devil and demanding the church be built elsewhere. The church was successfully rebuilt on a new site to the Devil's liking, and a wood grew around it to conceal it (either from the Devil's influence or to hide it from the parishioners). The legend probably dates from the Middle Ages.

A miracle was attributed to a former vicar of the church in 1488. It is said that he was robbed by three men while on his way to conduct a service, and had his tongue and eyes cut out to stop him recognising or describing the robbers. His sight and speech were purportedly restored in time for him to give evidence and bring them to justice.

Nationally known and local writers have frequently remarked on the solitude and visual appeal of Church in the Wood. A description of 1777 noted that although "the graveyard now contains many handsome monuments ... it still retains something of the sequestered situation ... in the middle of a wood". A description from 1874 stated simply that "the Church is picturesquely situated in the heart of a romantic wood, having no hut or house of any kind within a quarter of a mile". Diplock's Hastings Guidebook of 1845 stated "[i]t is the singularity of [its] situation, more than anything in the building itself, that generally attracts visitors ... it looks as if having been forsaken by all human visitants, a thicket had grown up and enclosed it like the Castle of the Sleeping Beauty in the old fairy tale". London essayist Charles Lamb wrote the best-known description after visiting Hastings in 1823:

The best thing I hit upon was a small country Church (by whom or when built unknown), standing bare and single in the midst of a grove, with no house or appearance of habitation within a quarter of a mile, only passages diverging from it through beautiful woods, to so many farm houses. There it stands, like the first idea of a Church, before parishioners were thought of, nothing but birds for its congregation...

— Charles Lamb, 1823

== The church today ==
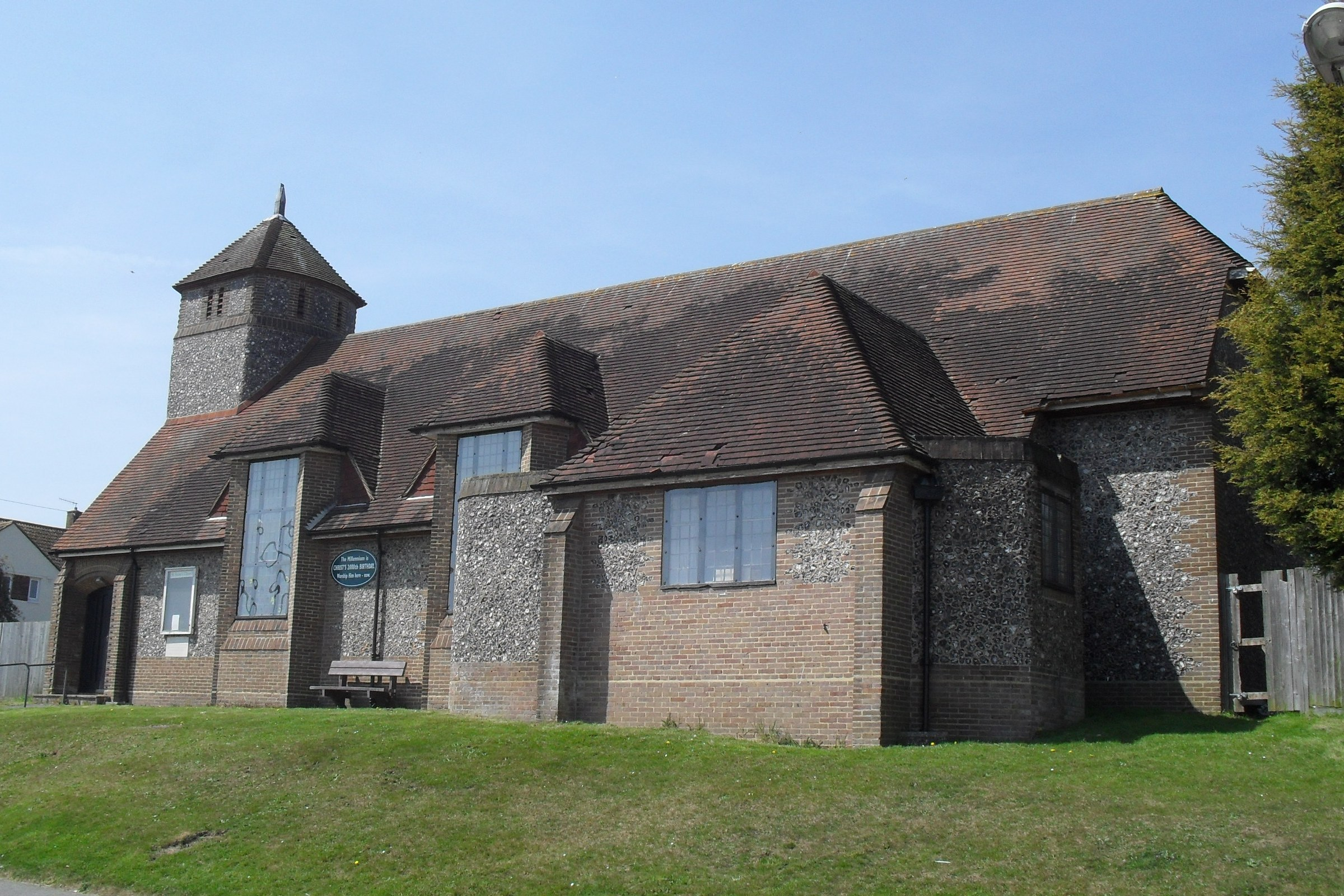
St Anne's Church was founded in 1956.

Church in the Wood was designated a Grade II Listed building on 19 January 1951.

The parish of St Leonard includes a second Anglican church—the modern St Anne's Church on Chambers Road (at 50.8723°N 0.5434°E). This was built over several years from 1956 by the Brighton-based firm Denman & Sons to serve the rapidly expanding council estate west of the Battle Road. The approximate boundaries of the parish are Battle Road, between the borough boundary in the north and Hollington Old Lane; the residential streets between Hollington and neighbouring Silverhill; the railway line between West St Leonards and Crowhurst railway stations (including some of the rural land west of it); and Breadsell Lane.

There is one service every Sunday at 10.30am at Church in the Wood and one every Sunday at 9.30am at St Anne's Church, except in months with five Sundays; on these occasions, the churches hold a joint service.

== See also ==
- List of places of worship in Hastings
