= St Mary Star of the Sea Church, Hastings =

St Mary's Church
- St Mary Star of the Sea Church
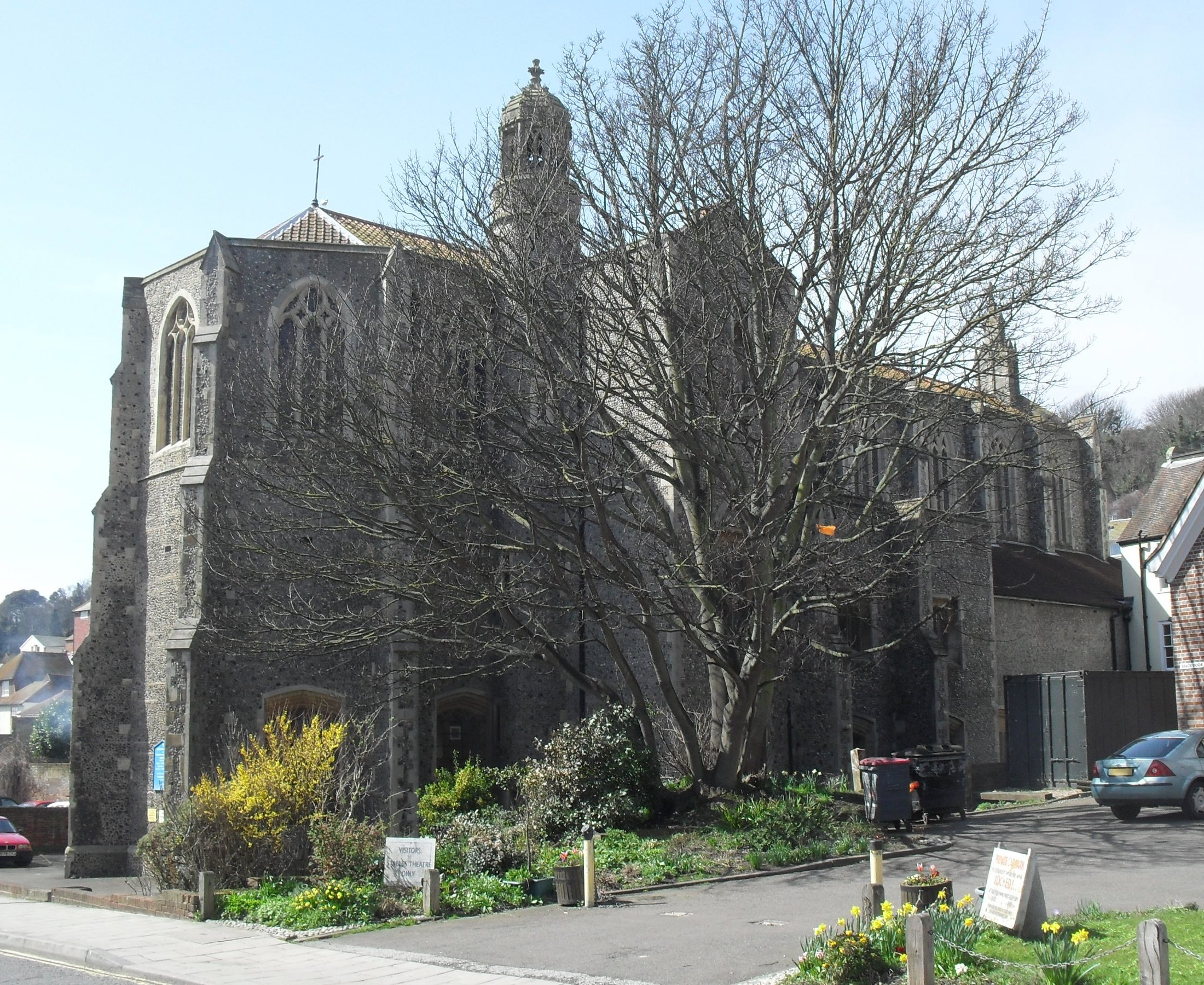
- St Mary's Church
- 50.8595°N 0.5944°E
- OS grid reference: TQ 82682 09871
- Location: Hastings, East Sussex
- Country: England
- Denomination: Roman Catholic
- Website: www.stmarystarofthesea.net

History
- Status: Active
- Dedication: Our Lady, Star of the Sea

Architecture
- Functional status: Parish church
- Heritage designation: Grade II listed
- Designated: 14 September 1976
- Architect: Basil Champneys
- Style: Gothic Revival
- Groundbreaking: 1882
- Completed: 2 July 1883
- Construction cost: £15,000

Administration
- Province: Southwark
- Diocese: Arundel and Brighton
- Deanery: St Leonards-on-Sea

St Mary Star of the Sea Church is a Roman Catholic Parish church in Hastings, East Sussex, England. It was built from 1882 to 1883 and designed by Basil Champneys. It is situated on the High Street, backing onto The Bourne in the Old Town. It was founded by the Pallottines and is a Grade II listed building. English Heritage describes the church as a "well crafted building of high quality."

== History ==
=== Foundation ===
A substantial part of the cost of building the church was paid for by the poet Coventry Patmore. In 1875, he and wife settled in Hastings. In 1880, his wife, Marianne, died and he contacted the Pallottines about founding a church in Hastings. The Pallottines bought the site of the church. It was a former farmhouse between the High Street and The Bourne. Patmore decided that he would donate £5,300 to the construction of the church, as long as the remainder of the £15,000 total cost was paid by the church.

=== Construction ===
In 1882, the foundation stone for the church building was laid by Dr. William Weathers, Titular Bishop of Amyela. The architect of the church was Basil Champneys. He was a friend of Patmore. The church was built on top of a crypt. While the church was being built, the crypt was used as a location to say Mass for the local Catholic population. On 2 July 1883, the church was opened. After the church was built, the space beneath the church housed a school until 1955. It was St Mary Star of the Sea Catholic Primary School and it moved to Magdalen Lane close to the Church of St Thomas of Canterbury and English Martyrs in St Leonards-on-Sea. In 1891, the reredos and altar of St Mary's Church were dedicated. The cost of the two came to £1,500.

== Parish ==
The church is still served by the Pallottines. It has three Sunday Masses every weekend: 6:00pm on Saturday, and 10:00am, 11:30am on Sunday. There is a Mass in Polish every first Sunday of the month, at 6:00pm. There are weekday Masses from Tuesday to Saturday at 10:00am.

== See also ==
- Roman Catholic Diocese of Arundel and Brighton
- List of places of worship in Hastings
