= St Peter's Church, Shoreham-by-Sea =

St John's Court (formerly St Peter's Church)
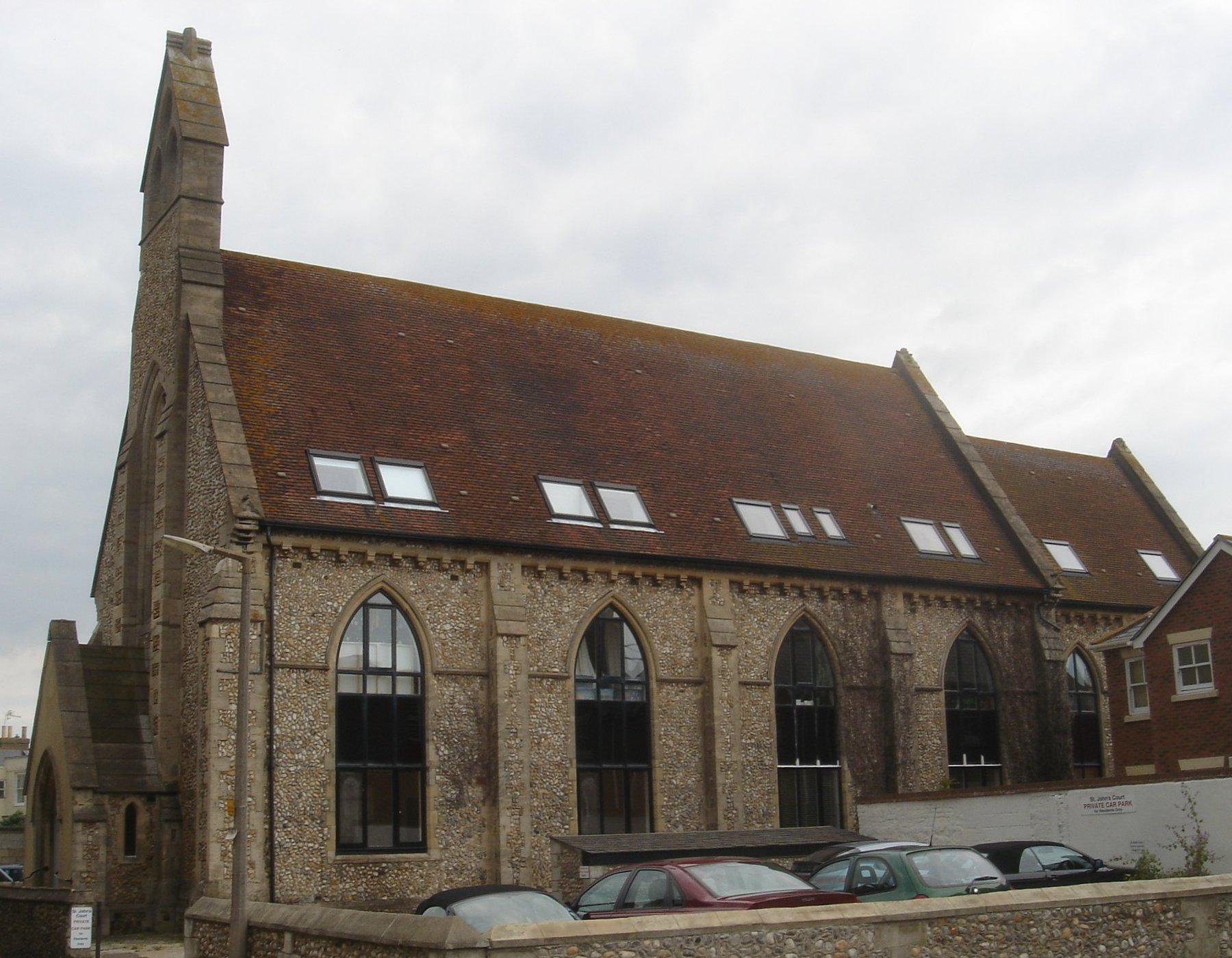
- The former church from the south-southwest
- Interactive map of St John's Court (formerly St Peter's Church)
- 50.8327°N 0.2769°W
- Location: Between Ship Street and John Street, Shoreham-by-Sea, West Sussex BN43 5DU, England

History
- Built: 1875

Site notes
- Architect: Charles Alban Buckler
- Architectural style: Decorated Gothic

Listed Building – Grade II
- Official name: Church of St. Peter and No. 7 John Street (the Shoreham-by-Sea Nursing Home)
- Designated: 16 August 1983
- Reference no.: 1193095

St Peter's Church
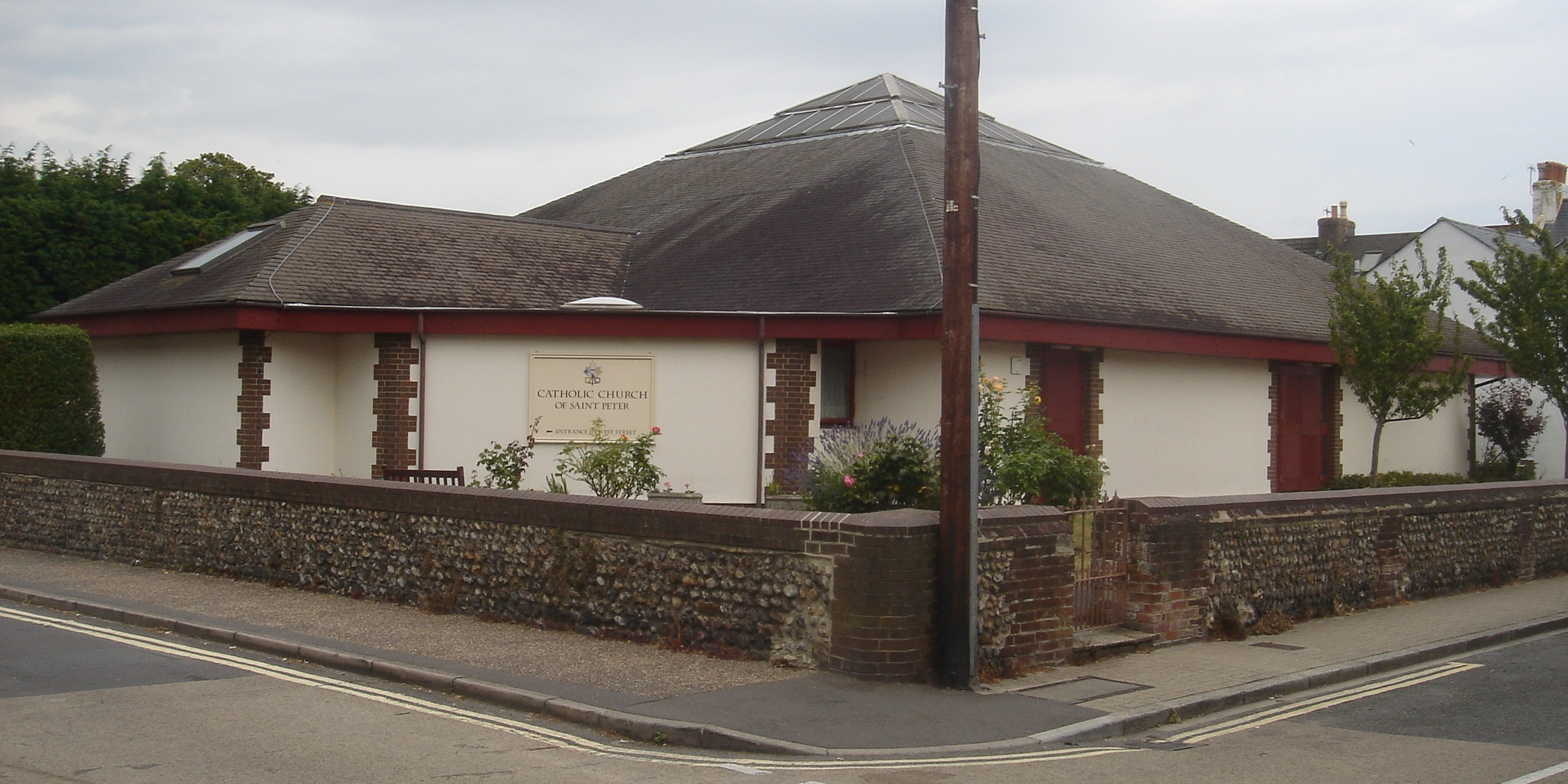
- The church from the south
- St Peter's Church
- 50.8341°N 0.2770°W
- Location: West Street, Shoreham-by-Sea, West Sussex BN43 5DL
- Country: England
- Denomination: Roman Catholic

History
- Status: Church
- Founded: 1875 (in previous building)
- Dedication: Saint Peter
- Consecrated: 1982

Architecture
- Functional status: Active
- Completed: 1982

Administration
- Diocese: Arundel and Brighton
- Deanery: Worthing
- Parish: Our Lady Queen of Peace, Adur Valley

Clergy
- Priest: Father Graham Ricketts

The name St Peter's Church has been borne by two Roman Catholic churches in the town of Shoreham-by-Sea in the district of Adur, in the English county of West Sussex. The original church with that dedication was the town's first permanent Roman Catholic place of worship; founded in 1875, it was paid for by Augusta, Duchess of Norfolk, a member of the most important Dukedom in England. After its closure, a new St Peter's Church was built nearby. The old building, which still stands and is in residential use, has been listed by English Heritage at Grade II for its architectural and historical importance.

== The former St Peter's Church ==
=== History ===
The settlement of Old Shoreham developed inland from the English Channel and next to the east bank of the River Adur. Its focus was the 10th-century St Nicolas' Church. Later development filled the gap between the village and the sea, and the growth of trade from its harbour in the 18th and 19th centuries brought prosperity to what was by then a small town.

By the mid-19th century, two large Anglican churches were supported—St Nicolas' Church had been joined by the substantial St Mary de Haura Church—but Roman Catholics had no place of worship. Around that time, a priest began to travel in from nearby Worthing to celebrate Mass at a house in Surry Street; in 1870 this arrangement moved to a former schoolroom on a site between John Street and Ship Street. The land on which this stood had been acquired in the 1860s by the former Vicar of Shoreham, Reverend William Wheeler. He had left the Church of England and was received into the Roman Catholic Church in 1855, and donated the land to enable a permanent church to be built.

The funds to build the church came from Augusta, Duchess of Norfolk. She had married into the Dukedom of Norfolk, England's most important Roman Catholic family, in 1839; her husband, Henry Fitzalan-Howard, 14th Duke of Norfolk, was the Lord of the manor and lived nearby at Arundel Castle, the ducal seat. Architect Charles Buckler, who was responsible for several Roman Catholic churches in Sussex, was commissioned to design and build the church. The building, described as "large, rather severe ... [and] assertive", was consecrated and opened in 1875. A presbytery was added on the east (John Street) side, in a matching style, in 1877. Its capacity was approximately 200, and it cost £5,000 (£499,000 as of 2025). It was registered for marriages in April 1877.

=== Architecture ===
Charles Buckler used the Decorated Gothic style, imitative of 13th- and 14th-century churches, for his design for St Peter's Church. The structure is of cobbled flint dressed with ashlar. It lacks a spire or tower, but there is a bell-tower at the west end of the roof, which is tiled and gabled. There are four large lancet windows in the north and south walls, separated by buttresses; until the building's conversion from a nursing home into flats, these had elaborate tracery. As originally built, the church had a four-bay nave and two further bays in the chancel, which also had a transept. A porch led into the nave on the west side. Inside, below the roof trusses, there was a gallery at the west end. Fittings included a reredos and a marble altar.

=== The building today ===
The church was closed and sold for redevelopment in 1982. It was converted into a nursing home, retaining most of its ecclesiastical features including the intricate window tracery. The latter was lost when the building was converted into flats in 2002, being replaced with plain modern windows instead, but there has otherwise been little structural alteration. The flats are named "St John's Court"—a reference to the former name of John Street. "St John" referred to the Knights of St John Hospitallers, who had been active in Shoreham since the mid-12th century.

English Heritage granted the former St Peter's Church Grade II listed status on 16 August 1983. Such buildings are defined as being "nationally important and of special interest". As of February 2001, it was one of 106 Grade II listed buildings, and 119 listed buildings of all grades, in Adur district.

== The new St Peter's Church ==
A new church—a low building with a rectangular plan—was built just north of its predecessor after it closed in 1982. Construction started in 1983. The building, which stands on the corner of West Street and North Street, is on the site of a Roman Catholic school which had closed and moved elsewhere in the town in the 1960s. Before that, a 17th-century house stood on the site; its grounds extended some distance to the north.

The church is part of the parish of Our Lady Queen of Peace, Adur Valley, which covers three Roman Catholic churches in the area (the others are at Steyning and Upper Beeding in the neighbouring district of Horsham). One priest serves all three.

Two Masses are celebrated every Sunday, and on Holy Days of Obligation an evening Mass is said.

== See also ==
- List of places of worship in Adur

== Bibliography ==
- Colquhoun, Edward W. (2008). Shoreham – In Times of Change. Shoreham-by-Sea: Marlipins Museum.
- Elleray, D. Robert (2004). Sussex Places of Worship. Worthing: Optimus Books. ISBN 0-9533132-7-1.
- Norman, Michael (1989). A Walkabout Guide to Shoreham (2nd ed.). Shoreham-by-Sea: Marlipins Museum.
