= St Leonard's Baptist Church, St Leonards-on-Sea =

St Leonard's Baptist Church
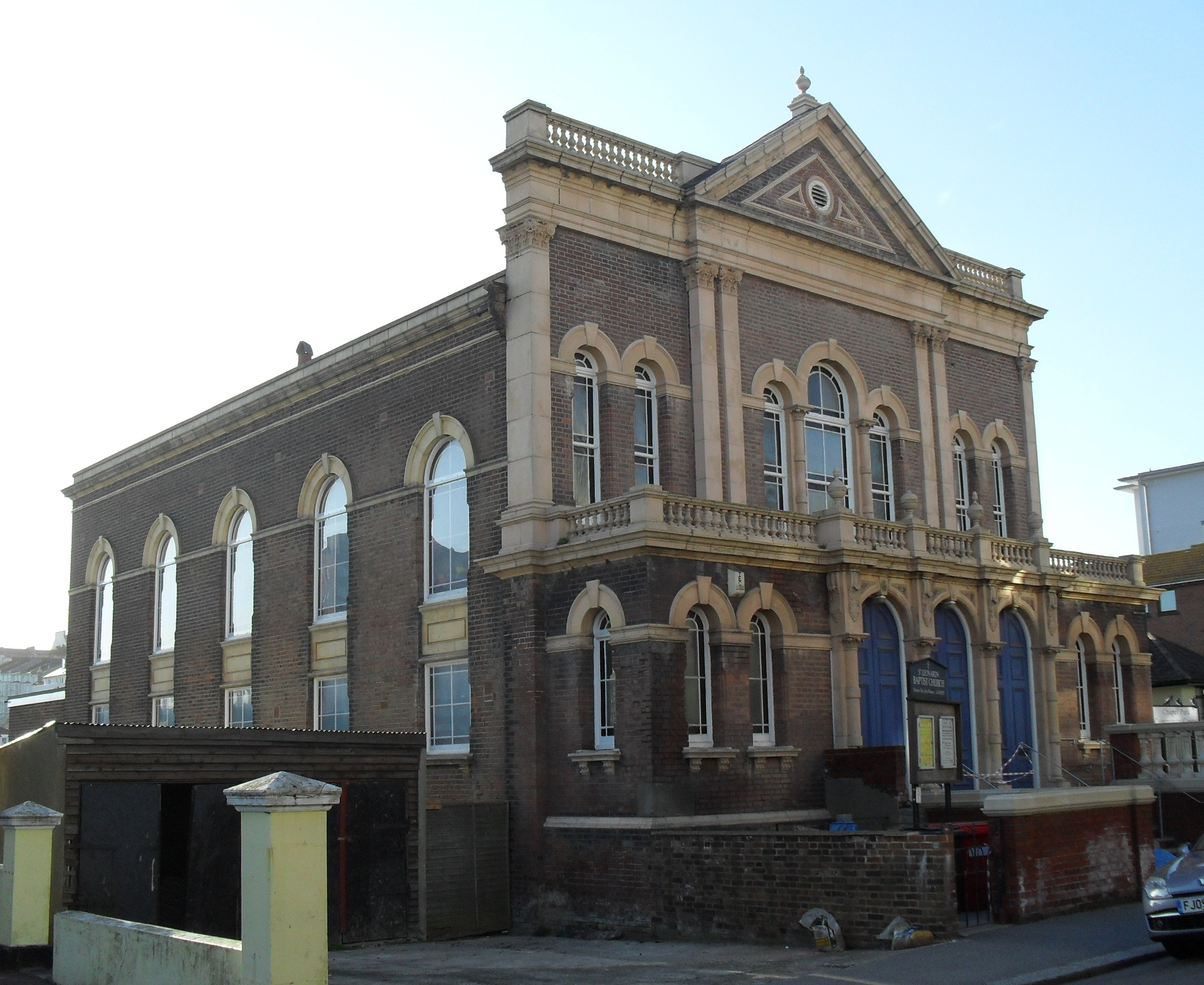
- The church from the southeast
- St Leonard's Baptist Church
- 50.8566°N 0.5616°E
- OS grid reference: TQ 80388 09469
- Location: Chapel Park Road, St Leonards-on-Sea, Hastings, East Sussex
- Country: England
- Denomination: Baptist
- Churchmanship: Contemporary
- Website: www.stleonardsbaptist.org

History
- Status: Church
- Founded: 1882
- Dedication: Leonard of Noblac

Architecture
- Functional status: Active
- Heritage designation: Grade II
- Designated: 10 January 1991
- Architect(s): Thomas Elworthy & Sons
- Style: Classical/Italianate
- Completed: 1882

Administration
- Division: East Sussex Network
- District: South Eastern Baptist Association

St Leonard's Baptist Church is the Baptist place of worship serving St Leonards-on-Sea, a town and seaside resort which is part of the Borough of Hastings in East Sussex, England. The elaborate building was designed by the architectural firm of Thomas Elworthy, responsible for many churches in late-Victorian era Sussex, and serves the residential hinterland of St Leonards-on-Sea—an area which grew rapidly after its early 19th-century founding by James Burton. English Heritage has listed the church at Grade II for its architectural and historical importance.

== History ==
Hastings, a medieval seaside town on the Sussex coast, was an important settlement by the 12th century: it had Hastings Castle and a mint, and was the main Cinque Port. With seven churches, it was also a religious centre. To the west, an area of undeveloped land—part of the Manor of Gensing—ran down to the English Channel coast and offered excellent views. Consisting of a well-wooded valley leading to flat, sheltered land by a beach, it had the potential for residential development.

Businessman and property developer James Burton, father of the architect Decimus Burton, exploited this potential in the early 19th century when he laid out the new town of St Leonards-on-Sea. Encouraged by a resurgence in Hastings' popularity in the late 18th century, he bought land from the Eversfield baronets, owners of Gensing Manor, in 1828 and built a residential town and seaside resort over the next few years. An Act of Parliament passed in 1832 changed the status of the town from a private speculation to a properly incorporated settlement which could be governed, taxed and further developed.

Success was assured after the Duchess of Kent and her daughter Princess (later Queen) Victoria stayed in the town in 1834, and residential development northwards along the inland valley occurred after St Leonards Warrior Square railway station was built in 1851, making London and Brighton accessible by train. By that time, churches existed for Congregationalists, Anglicans and Roman Catholics. In 1882, architect Thomas Elworthy of the firm Elworthy and Sons was commissioned to design a church for the town's growing Baptist community. The chosen site was on Chapel Park Road, near the railway station. Elworthy was from St Leonards-on-Sea and was a prolific church architect, principally for the Congregationalists. His late 19th-century designs tended towards the Renaissance Revival and Classical styles, in reaction to the almost universal use of Gothic Revival forms earlier in the century. As an architect, he was "much maligned": his Congregational chapel of 1881 in Robertsbridge was described as "truly horrible" by Nikolaus Pevsner, for example. Two other Elworthy churches in the Hastings area, Congregational churches on The Croft and Mount Pleasant Road, were demolished in 1972.

Construction work started in 1882 and continued until the next year, when the church opened. Some architectural work was also carried out by the firm of Stiff and Sons of Lambeth, London.

== Architecture ==
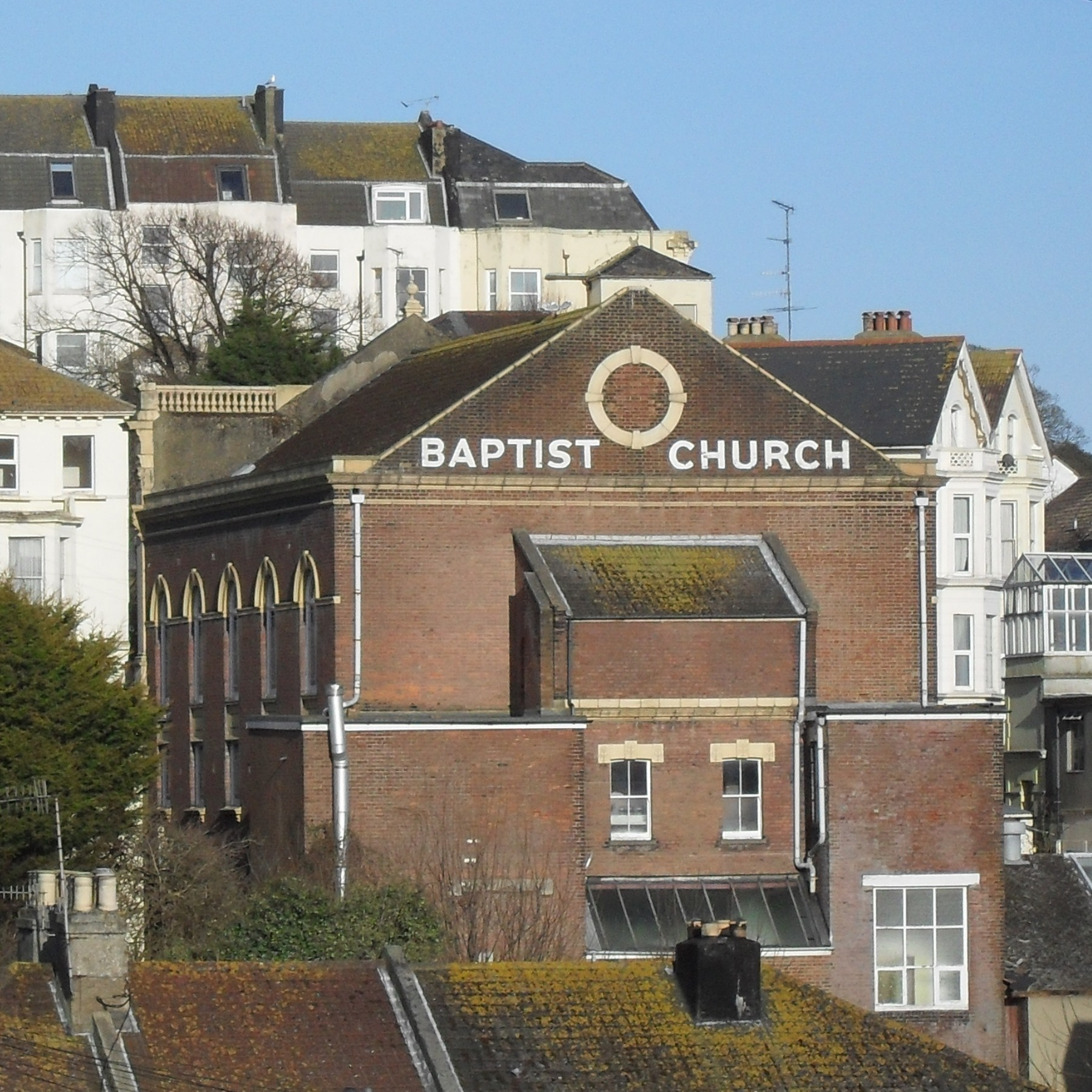
The rear, seen from the west.

The church has an ornate, decorative façade which combines Classical elements with Thomas Elworthy's preferred Renaissance Revival style and some Italianate features. It is built of red brick laid in the Flemish bond pattern, with terracotta window surrounds and dressings designed by the architectural firm of Stiff and Sons. The roof has been renewed with concrete tiles. Steps with terracotta-dressed cement walls and piers lead to three identical round-arched entrance doors with wood panelling, flanked by terracotta columns and set below a balustrade. This is supported on brackets with foliage decoration, and has four decorative terracotta urns corresponding with the top of each column. This forms the centre bay of a three-bay façade; the outer bays have paired round-arched windows. The balustrade spans the width of the façade between ground- and first-floor level, forming a kind of porch or portico. At first-floor level, Classical motifs include Composite/Corinthian pilasters and an intricately decorated pediment. The tall pilasters are arranged in pairs flanking the central bay and singly at the outer bays. The pediment is topped by another terracotta urn and is flanked by a stone balustrade on both sides. There are three arched windows to the centre bay, the centre one taller and wider and all featuring engaged columns (columns which are partially sunk into the wall to which they are attached). Paired round-arched windows light the outer bays. The side walls have five arched windows set below a cornice of moulded terracotta. The hall beneath the church includes a full-height single-bay brick extension with an arched window. An elaborate wooden gallery supported on iron columns survives inside.

== Status ==
St Leonard's Baptist Church was listed at Grade II by English Heritage on 10 January 1991. This defines it as a "nationally important" building of "special interest". As of February 2001, it was one of 521 Grade II listed buildings, and 535 listed buildings of all grades, in the borough of Hastings. It is one of several listed churches in St Leonards-on-Sea

The church is one of four Baptist places of worship in the Borough of Hastings. Administratively, the church belongs to the East Sussex Network of the South Eastern Baptist Association.

The Chapel Park Community Centre is in the hall underneath the church.

The church is licensed for worship in accordance with the Places of Worship Registration Act 1855.

== See also ==
- List of places of worship in Hastings
