= Hollington, Hastings =

Suburb and local government ward in the northwest of Hastings, England

Coordinates: 50.875°N 0.548°E

Hollington
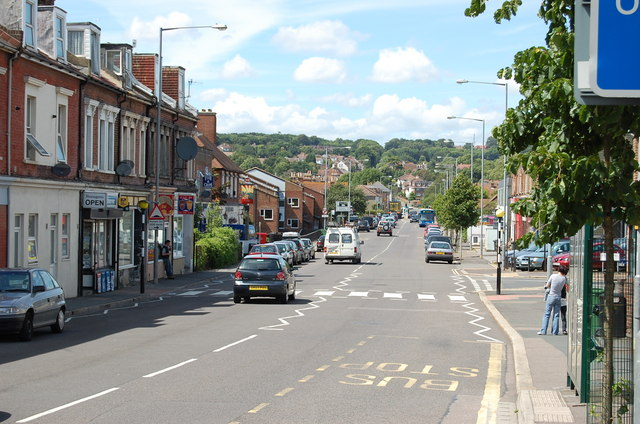

- Location within East Sussex
- Population: 6,099 (ward. 2011)
- District: Hastings
- Shire county: East Sussex
- Region: South East
- Country: England
- Sovereign state: United Kingdom
- Post town: ST. LEONARDS-ON-SEA
- Postcode district: TN38
- Police: Sussex
- Fire: East Sussex
- Ambulance: South East Coast
- UK Parliament: Hastings and Rye

Hollington is a council estate and local government ward in the northwest of Hastings, in the Hastings district, in the county of East Sussex, England. The area lies next to Baldslow, Ashdown, North and Conquest, and less than five miles southeast of Battle, East Sussex, the home of Battle Abbey, which commemorates the victory of William the Conqueror at the Battle of Hastings in 1066.

The area is believed to have been occupied since at least Roman times prior to becoming farmland and subsequently developed during the 1930s onwards.

Hollington was the location of The Grove School, which was incorporated into The St Leonards Academy becoming known as the 'Darwell Campus'. The school, which was constructed at the location of The Grove, the manor house for the Lords of the Manor of Hollington. The Levett family built The Grove, and then the property was carried into the Eversfield family by a Levett heiress. The eventual lord of the manor became Thomas Eversfield of Uckfield, bringing the Eversfield family from their early Sussex beginnings to the Hastings area, where they would go on to play a prominent role for centuries. The Eversfields inherited when Levett heir Lawrence Levett died without issue, leaving his estate to his sister Mary (Levett) Eversfield, wife of Thomas Eversfield. Adam Ashburnham, ancestor of the Ashburnham baronets of Broomham and half-brother of Lawrence Levett, inherited some of their mother Eve Adams Levett Ashburnham's property at Guestling. The school buildings were demolished circa 2017 and the land is earmarked for housing development.

The Hollington Stream runs from Silverhill, through Hollington Wood towards the sea at Bulverhythe.

In 2016 new homes were constructed near Robsack Community centre.

== Civil parish ==
In 1891 the parish had a population of 2056. On 9 November 1897 the parish was abolished and split to "Hollington St. John" and Hollington Rural.

== Places of Worship ==
- St John The Evangelist Located in Upper Church Road
- Church in the Wood, Hollington
- Holy Redeemer Catholic Church
