= St John the Evangelist's Church, St Leonards-on-Sea =

St John the Evangelist's Church
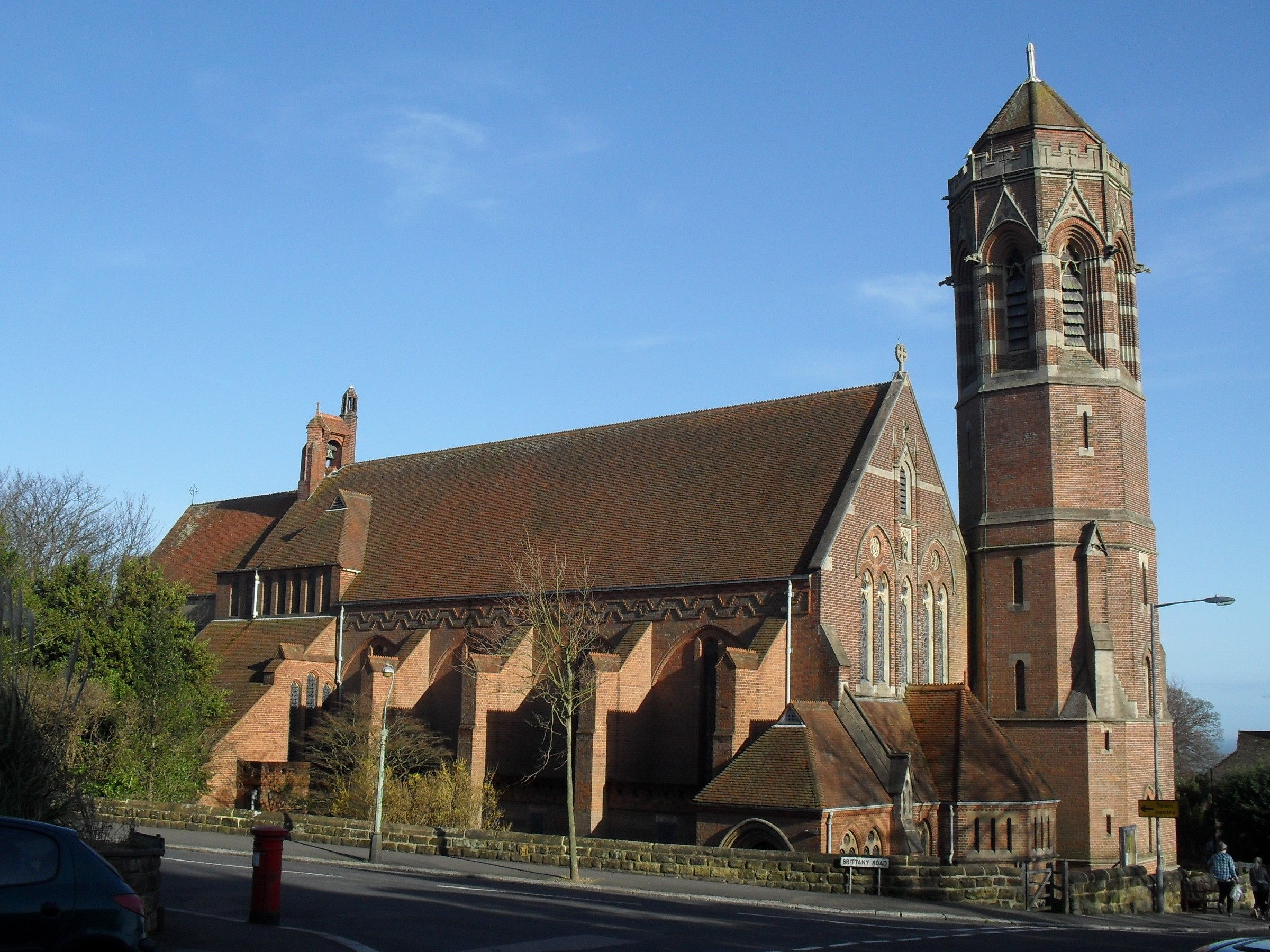
- The church from the northwest

- 50.8559°N 0.5530°E
- Location: Upper Maze Hill/Pevensey Road, Upper St Leonards, Hastings, East Sussex TN38 0RD
- Country: England
- Denomination: Anglican
- Churchmanship: Open Catholic
- Website: www.stjohnspevenseyroad.org.uk

History
- Status: Parish church
- Founded: 1865 (in temporary church)
- Founder: Fr. Charles Lyndhurst Vaughan of Christ Church
- Dedication: John the Evangelist
- Dedicated: 20 April 1865
- Consecrated: 1883
- Events: 1865: Temporary church erected 1866: Church destroyed by a storm c. 1867: New church opened 1878: Building damaged by fire 1880: Work started on replacement church 1943: Church bombed 1950: Rebuilding started

Architecture
- Functional status: Active
- Heritage designation: Grade II*
- Designated: 14 September 1976
- Architect(s): Arthur Blomfield (original church); Harry Stuart Goodhart-Rendel (rebuilding)
- Style: Early English Gothic Revival
- Completed: 1881
- Construction cost: £12,300

Administration
- Diocese: Chichester
- Archdeaconry: Hastings
- Deanery: Hastings
- Parish: Upper St Leonards: St John the Evangelist

Clergy
- Rector: Father David Royston Hill

St John the Evangelist's Church is the Anglican parish church of the Upper St Leonards area of St Leonards-on-Sea, a town and seaside resort which is part of the Borough of Hastings in East Sussex, England. The present building—a "very impressive and beautifully detailed" church in the Gothic Revival style, with a landmark tower—combines parts of Arthur Blomfield's 1881 church, wrecked during World War II, and Harry Stuart Goodhart-Rendel's 1950s rebuild. Two earlier churches on the site, the second possibly designed by Samuel Sanders Teulon, were themselves destroyed earlier in the 19th century. The rich internal fittings include a complete scheme of stained glass by Goodhart-Rendel's favoured designer Joseph Ledger and a 16th-century painting by Ortolano Ferrarese. English Heritage has listed the church at Grade II* for its architectural and historical importance.

== History ==
St Leonards-on-Sea was founded as a new town by builder and speculator James Burton in 1827. It was built on a sloping, well-wooded seafront location just to the west of the ancient port of Hastings, and immediately became a fashionable resort and residential area—rivalling its larger neighbour by the mid-19th century. Burton founded a parish church on the seafront in 1831 (St Leonard's Church), and another (St Mary Magdalene's Church) opened in 1858. Both catered mainly for fashionable visitors and richer residents: pew rents were charged, for example. The growing town's many artisans, manual labourers, shopkeepers and other working-class people, and the large number of workers brought in to build Burton's new town, had nowhere to worship unless they travelled to the Church in the Wood in Hollington, several miles away.

Lady St John (Louisa Boughton), the widow of Sir John Vaughan and St Andrew St John, 14th Baron St John of Bletso, paid for a third church to be built in the town; sittings would be free, so poor people could attend. Christ Church, on the main London Road, opened in 1860. Its new vicar from 1863, Rev. Charles Lyndhurst Vaughan, son of Lady St John, worked hard to advance its influence, and the church became so popular that it was often full. Meanwhile, more residential development was taking place to the north, in an area which became known as Upper St Leonards. As well as building a new, larger Christ Church, Rev. Vaughan founded another church at Gensing Farm in Upper St Leonards. The temporary structure, which cost £2,000 (£217,000 as of 2025), was dedicated to St John the Evangelist and opened on 20 April 1865.

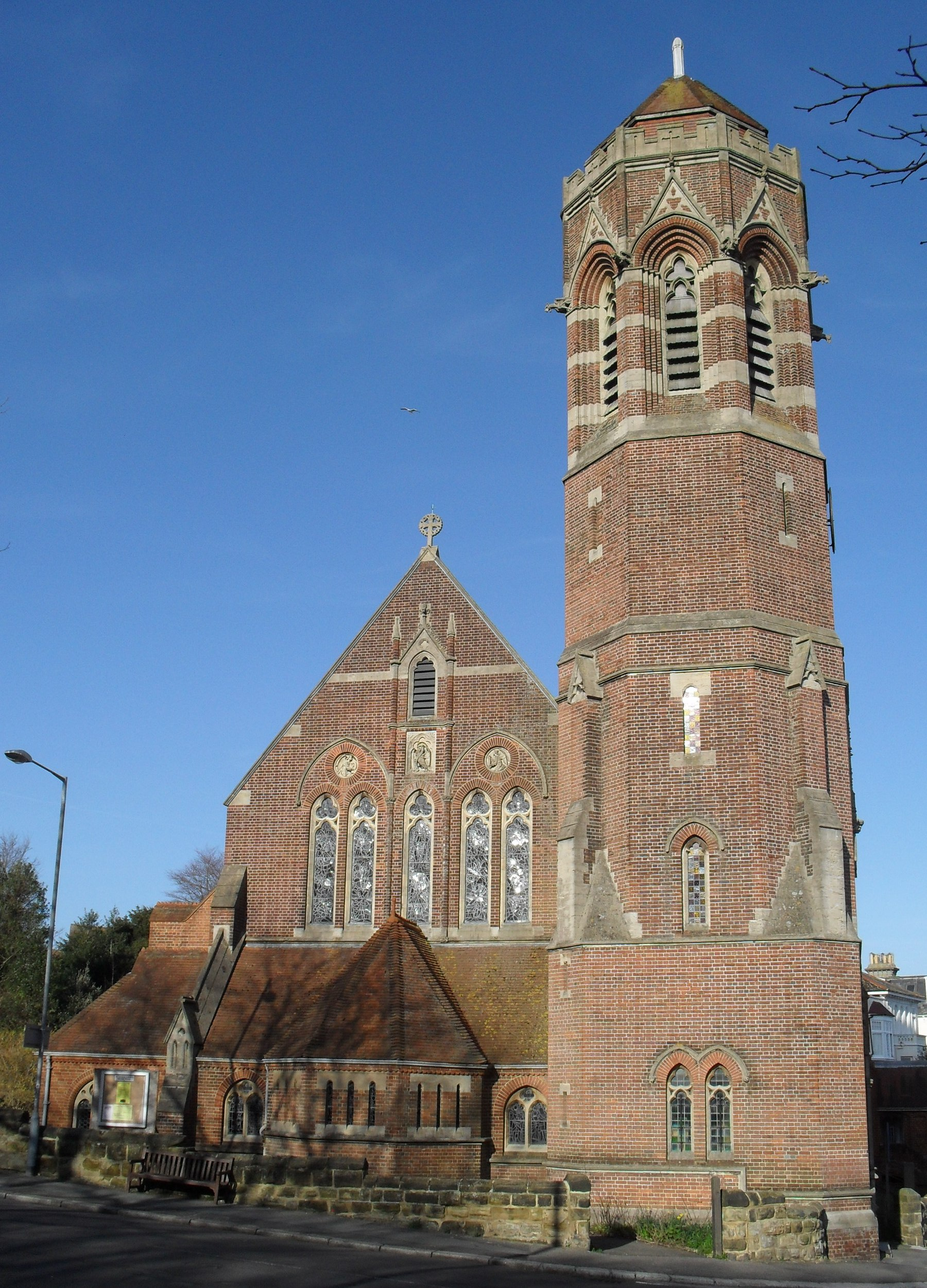
The tower is the main surviving structural feature of Arthur Blomfield's building of 1881, which was severely damaged by bombing in 1943.

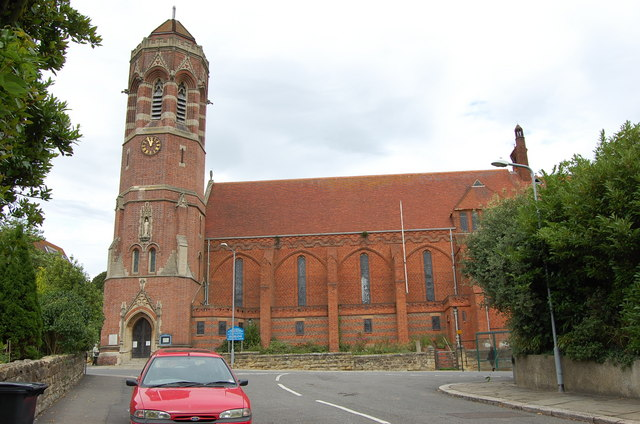
Harry Stuart Goodhart-Rendel's replacement nave and chancel adjoin the octagonal tower.

The iron building, known locally as "The Round Church", was severely damaged by a storm in October 1866 which destroyed the roof. Rev. Vaughan ensured that it was soon rebuilt, this time in brick: construction finished in July 1867 and a procession from Christ Church to the new building preceded its opening on 6 August 1867. Architect Samuel Sanders Teulon, who built Holy Trinity Church in central Hastings in 1857–59 and two other churches in Rye Harbour and Icklesham around the same time, has been suggested as the designer. This building only lasted 11 years, though: overnight on 30 November–1 December 1878, it caught fire and was destroyed. During the 1870s, worship took on a strongly High church, Anglo-Catholic character: Reservation of the Sacrament was kept from 1874, and the Tenebrae was celebrated in the same year.

The church was again rebuilt, this time to the designs of Arthur Blomfield, a prolific and "distinguished" ecclesiastical architect who favoured the Gothic Revival style. His other Sussex churches include the new Christ Church itself; All Souls Church, Hastings; All Saints Church, Roffey; the rebuilt Chapel Royal, Brighton; St Andrew's Church, Worthing; St Luke's Church, Queen's Park, Brighton; St Leodegar's Church, Hunston and St Barnabas' Church, Bexhill. Part of the nave of the 1867 was restored and incorporated into the new building, on which work began in 1880. A year earlier, the link with Christ Church had been broken when the ecclesiastical parishes were separated.

Construction was largely complete in 1881, although some work continued until 1884. The final cost was £12,300 (£1,293,000 as of 2025), and the third St John the Evangelist's Church was consecrated in 1883. The church continued to thrive in the new building, and like its former mother church it became noted for its music: a choir school operated between 1896 and 1927.

The church suffered another setback in 1943 when it was bombed during the Luftwaffe's raids during World War II. On 9 February 1943, a 1,000-pound (450 kg) bomb passed through the spire and tower and exploded in the aisle, destroying the building. Only the tall octagonal tower and parts of the west wall and baptistery survived. In 1949, a hall built next to the ruins was put into use as a temporary church while another new building took shape behind the tower. Harry Stuart Goodhart-Rendel, a "leading authority on Victorian Gothic architecture" who often adopted elements of other styles and took a free-thinking, unconventional approach to church design (as at his St Wilfrid's Church, Brighton), was commissioned. His design, a free interpretation of the Gothic Revival style in red brick and "with rich ornament and many mannered details", was executed between 1950 and 1954. Most work took place between 1951 and 1952, and the first parts to be reconstructed were the transepts and nave. On 18 May 1951, Princess Elizabeth (the late Queen Elizabeth II) laid the foundation stone, and dedication ceremonies were held for the new nave and chancel in 1952 and 1957 respectively. A side chapel and a vestry were built in the 1960s. The original spire, damaged by the bombing of 1943, could not be restored and was removed; the top of the tower was altered and a "cap" added instead.

== Architecture ==
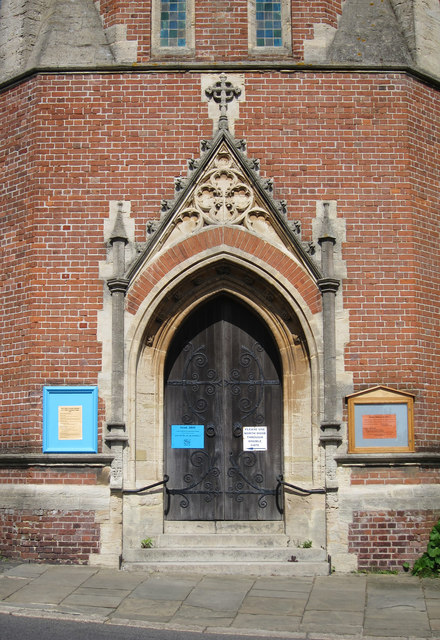
The entrance is in the base of the four-stage tower.

Arthur Blomfield's church of 1881 was built in his preferred Early English Gothic Revival style, mostly in red brick with some Bath Stone dressings. The arcade-flanked nave had five and a half bays—an arrangement also seen at Blomfield's St John the Evangelist's Church in Preston Village, Brighton—a clerestory and a queen post ceiling. The aisles on the north and south sides had brick arches and Bath Stone pillars. The chancel had an organ chamber. The octagonal tower at the southwest corner (a local landmark) rose in four stages, the topmost of which had four bells. The church also had a baptistery.

Only the tower and the west wall of the nave survived the bombing in 1943. These remains were incorporated into Goodhart-Rendel's redesigned church, which is also Early English Gothic Revival—albeit an inventive interpretation of that style (English Heritage described it as a "particularly eclectic mix"). Goodhart-Rendel "accepted every tenet of Gothic architecture except the pointed arch", and his design for this was closer to Gothic principles than any of his other postwar churches (of which a Sussex example is the Friary Church of St Francis and St Anthony, Crawley). Red brick was the chosen building material inside and out, although yellow bricks were used in places as a contrast and diaper patterning is used extensively. The nave still has five and a half bays, but Goodhart-Rendel extended the chancel and inserted transverse arches which were likened by Nairn and Pevsner to a "strange bridge" crossing it. The damaged spire on the tower was replaced with a low cap, but the pointed-arched louvres with their decorative mouldings and the castellated parapet at the top (bell) stage remain. The entrance is in a porch in the lowest stage.

The body of the church is "powerfully massed" and "fortress-like", emphasised by its prominent brick buttresses to the aisles. Between each buttress is a lancet window. There are small transepts with dormer windows. The transept roofs are on the same level as the chancel roof and lower than that of the nave. A small bell-turret sits on top of the chancel roof.

Inside, the nave and chancel are separated by a round-headed double chancel arch which was to have been flanked by niches—an unrealised aspect of Goodhart-Rendel's plan. The double arch—"the interior's most powerful feature"—was intended to support both the vaulted roof and the organ, although the present organ stands in the north transept. It came from St Catharine's College, Cambridge in 1974. The aisles are narrower and less substantial than those in Blomfield's church. The interior walls are mostly of stone coated with plaster and render, and the panelled chancel ceiling is painted. The chancel has a stone floor. Fittings include a 19th-century square-bowled font on a carved marble base, a lectern of the same era, chandeliers and an octagonal pulpit. The stained glass, featuring much white glass, was all designed by Joseph Ledger in 1952, apart from some "colourful" angels in the baptistery which were provided by a Miss Thompson. These were similar to some of the windows in the old church. Ledger met Goodhart-Rendel while in his 20s and became the architect's favoured stained glass designer. He later became a noted ceramicist. The church has a 16th-century painting of the Adoration of Jesus by Ortolano Ferrarese. Many internal fittings, such as the lectern, choir stalls and fixtures from the Lady chapel, came from Blomfield's church.

== The church today ==
St John the Evangelist's Church was listed at Grade II* by English Heritage on 14 September 1976. This defines it as a "particularly important" building of "more than special interest". As of February 2001, it was one of 13 Grade II* listed buildings, and 535 listed buildings of all grades, in the borough of Hastings. It is one of several listed churches in St Leonards-on-Sea. Christ Church, its former mother church, is also listed at Grade II*, as is St Peter's Church in the Bohemia area of the town; and St Leonard's Anglican church, St Leonard's Baptist Church, the Greek Orthodox St Mary Magdalene's Church, the Roman Catholic Church of St Thomas of Canterbury and English Martyrs and the former St Leonards-on-Sea Congregational Church each have Grade II status.

The church serves an area of St Leonards-on-Sea known as Upper St Leonards. Most of the parish lies north of the railway line between St Leonards Warrior Square and West St Leonards stations; the line forms part of the southern and western boundaries. The A2102 London Road, Springfield Road and Sedlescombe Road South form other boundaries with neighbouring parishes.

Worship has a High church "Open Catholic" character. Two services are held on Sunday mornings; morning or evening prayer sessions take place six days a week; and morning services take place on Tuesdays and Wednesdays.

== See also ==
- List of places of worship in Hastings
- Baston Lodge to the south

== Bibliography ==
- Elleray, D. Robert (1979). Hastings: a Pictorial History. Chichester: Phillimore & Co. ISBN 0-85033-324-5.
- Elleray, D. Robert (1981). The Victorian Churches of Sussex. Chichester: Phillimore & Co. Ltd. ISBN 0-85033-378-4.
- Elleray, D. Robert (2004). Sussex Places of Worship. Worthing: Optimus Books. ISBN 0-9533132-7-1.
- Funnell, Barry (1975). Christ Church, St Leonards-on-Sea: 1859–1975. St Leonards-on-Sea: Budd & Gillatt.
- Harwood, Elain (2000). England: a Guide to Post-War Listed Buildings. London: Ellipsis London Ltd (under licence from English Heritage). ISBN 1-84166-037-X.
- Manwaring Baines, J. (1990) [1956]. Burton's St Leonards (2nd ed.). Hastings: Hastings Museum.
- Nairn, Ian; Pevsner, Nikolaus (1965). The Buildings of England: Sussex. Harmondsworth: Penguin Books. ISBN 0-14-071028-0.
- Salzman, L.F., ed. (1973) [1937]. A History of Sussex. The Victoria Histories of the Counties of England. Vol. 9. Folkestone: Dawsons of Pall Mall (originally Oxford: Oxford University Press). ISBN 0-7129-0590-1.
- Thornton, David (1987). Hastings: a Living History. Hastings: The Hastings Publishing Co. ISBN 0-9512201-0-1.
