= St Leonards-on-Sea Congregational Church =

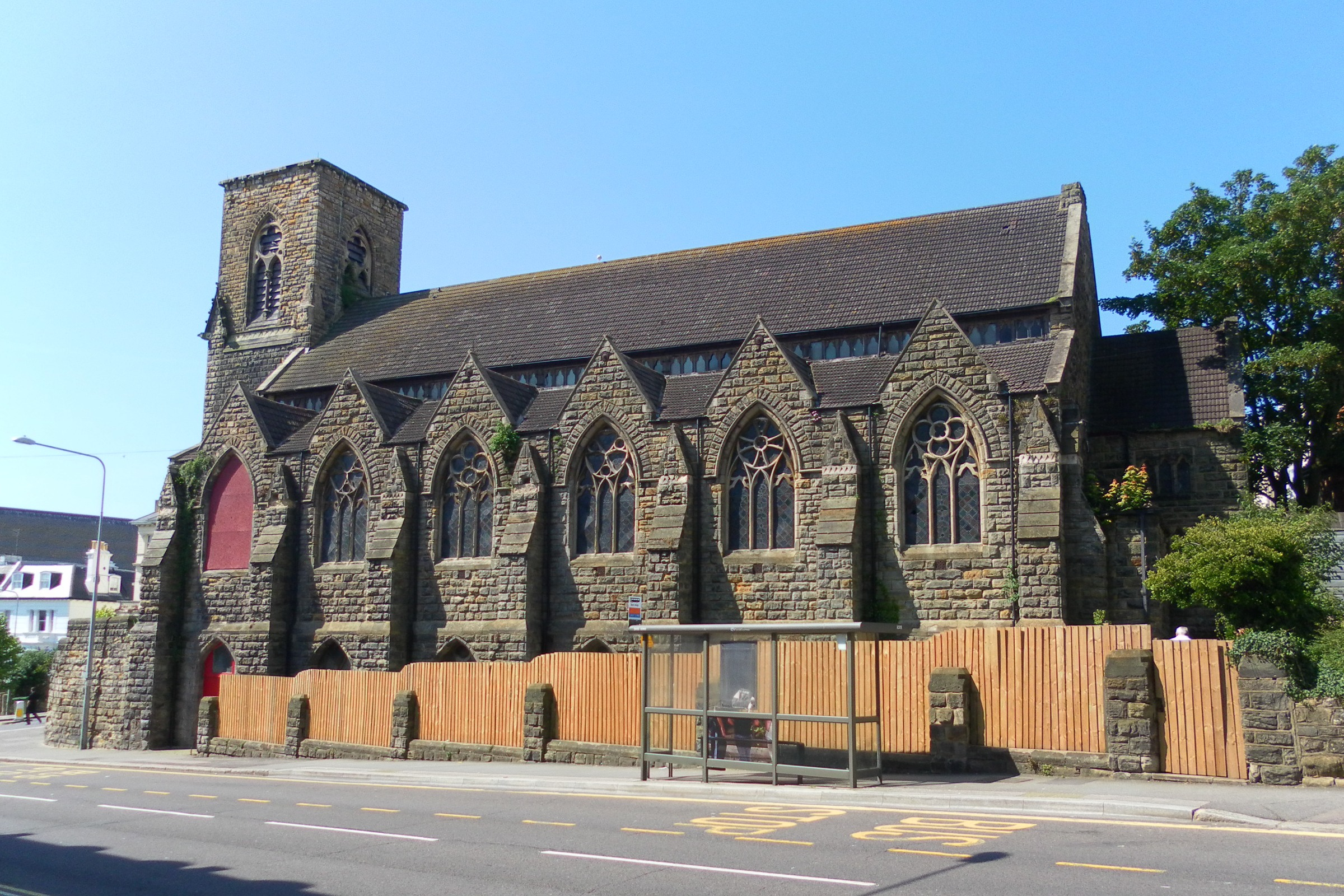
- The church from the east
- St Leonards-on-Sea Congregational Church
- 50.8548°N 0.5591°E
- OS grid reference: TQ 80220 09245
- Location: London Road/Pevensey Road, St Leonards-on-Sea, Hastings, East Sussex
- Country: England
- Denomination: Congregational Federation

History
- Former name: St Leonards Congregational Church
- Status: Church
- Founded: 1863
- Founder: James Griffin
- Consecrated: 1864
- Events: 1864: Opened as St Leonards-on-Sea Congregational Church; 1987: Building damaged in the Great Storm; 2002: Last service 2008: Officially closed

Architecture
- Functional status: Disused
- Heritage designation: Grade II
- Designated: 10 September 2003
- Architect: Edward Habershon but credited to William Habershon
- Style: Gothic Revival
- Groundbreaking: 1863
- Completed: 1864
- Closed: 2008

Specifications
- Materials: Local sandstone

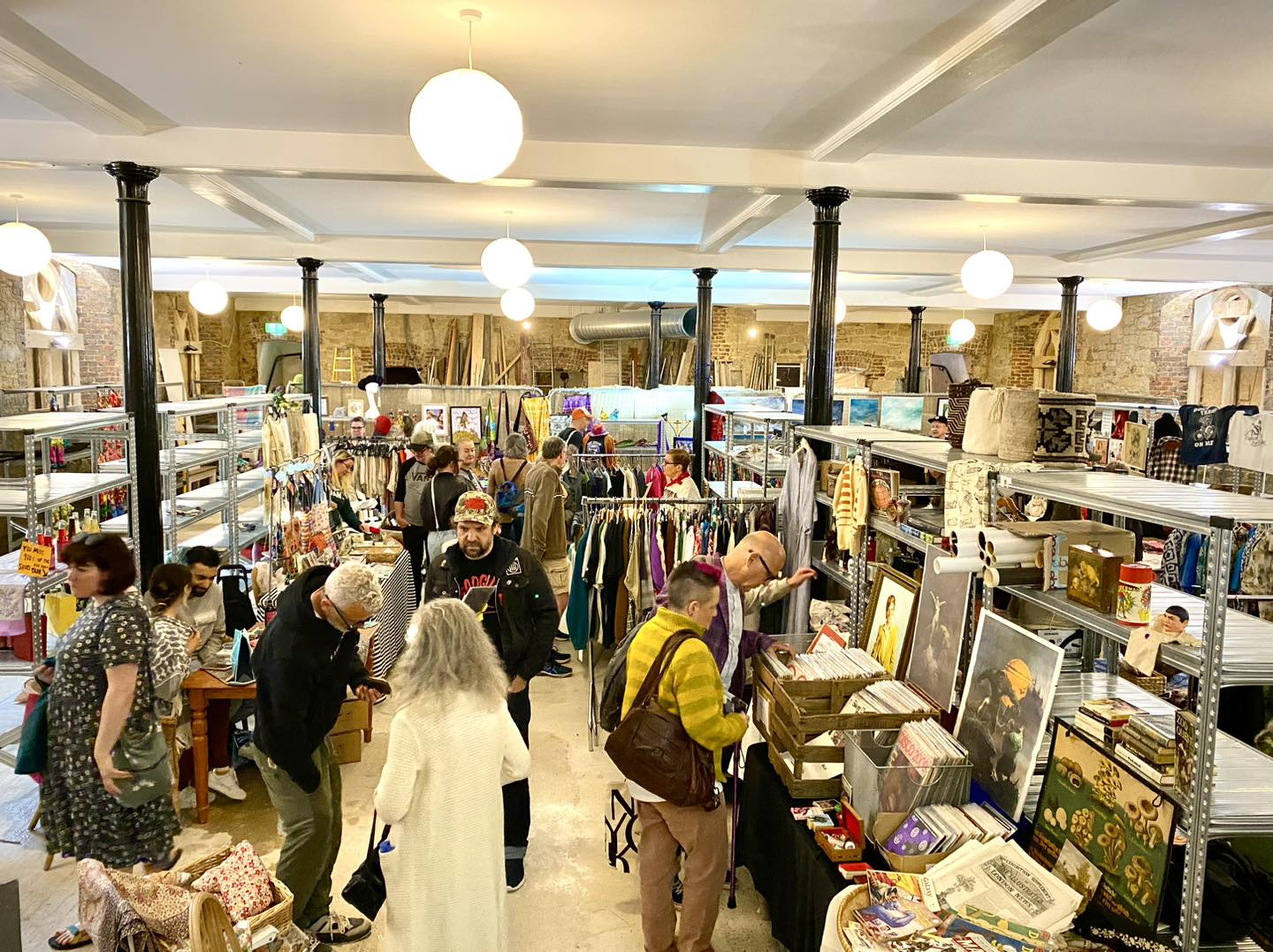
A busy day at the new Saint Leonards Church Saturday Market, opened on 6 April 2024

St Leonards-on-Sea Congregational Church is a former Congregational church in St Leonards-on-Sea, part of the town and borough of Hastings in East Sussex, England. Considered "one of the most ambitious Nonconformist buildings in Sussex", the sandstone building of 1863 forms a significant landmark on one of the Victorian resort's main roads—despite the loss of its copper spire in the Great Storm of 1987. Unlike most churches of its denomination, it did not join the United Reformed Church when that denomination was formed in 1972. It fell out of religious use in 2008 and had stood empty and was at risk of demolition. English Heritage has listed the building at Grade II for its architectural and historical importance. Bought by a new owner in 2012 it was almost completely renovated, but was then sold again in 2019. The new owner originally planned to open the church to the public as an arts and antiques centre with a cafe in the tower. After 5 years carefully and painstakingly renovating the building to its original glory, the lower church hall was finally re-opened to the public on 6 April 2024 as an indoor weekend Market open on Saturdays and Sundays, selling vintage and collectable items. The enormous and spectacular gothic 'Great Hall' upstairs is now a registered wedding venue available to hire for couples. The venue also has an enormous reception area downstairs, so weddings and receptions can take place in the same building.

== History ==
Hastings, an important fishing port, Cinque Port and defence site on the southeast coast of England, was already a significant town in 928 when it was first documented. Its development, constrained for many centuries by a deep valley and poor transport links, accelerated rapidly in the late 18th and early 19th centuries as sea-bathing, promenading and other seaside leisure activities became increasingly fashionable. Roads and (later) railway lines were built, attracting day-trippers and new residents, and by the 1820s the town was a noted leisure destination.

James Burton, a London-based builder and speculator who had executed large-scale developments in North London before moving to Tunbridge Wells in Kent, saw the potential of the land immediately west of the growing town. It was originally the pre-medieval Manor of Gensing. By the 1820s it consisted of a large area of flat land on top of some small cliffs leading to the beach, and a gently sloping tree-lined valley. The landowner had died in 1818, and his trustees planned to sell the site to be built upon. Burton bought it on 27 February 1828, having already drawn up plans to found and construct a new, high-class town and resort to rival neighbouring Hastings. The town was called St Leonards-on-Sea in reference to the ancient Hastings parish of St Leonard's, whose church of that dedication stood in the area covered by the new town from the 11th century until it was destroyed between 1404 and 1428. Burton's development immediately became fashionable, and even attracted early royal visitors when Victoria of Saxe-Coburg-Saalfeld (the Duchess of Kent) and her daughter Princess (later Queen) Victoria stayed during the winter of 1834.

A turnpike was built in 1836 connecting St Leonards-on-Sea to the main road to London (the present A21), cutting out the former indirect route via Hastings, Ore and The Ridge. St Leonards Warrior Square railway station was opened nearby in February 1851, and this inland part of St Leonards-on-Sea became a new growth area housing mostly working-class people. The construction of an Anglican place of worship, Christ Church, in 1860, was soon followed by the establishment of a Nonconformist community who needed a church of their own: Protestant Nonconformity was thriving in the Hastings area by the mid-19th century, in common with many other parts of Sussex. James Griffin, a local Congregationalist, founded the church in 1863, and building work started on 23 February 1864 when the foundation stone was laid. The first service at St Leonards-on-Sea Congregational Church was held on 27 October of that year. Thomas Spalding, board member of Spalding & Hodge and the owner of Ore Place (formerly the manor house of the nearby village of Ore), donated locally quarried sandstone, and the design and building work were credited to William Habershon and his pupil Edgar Brock. As a Grade II listed building it is mistakenly credited to Edward Habershon's brother William; but it was Edward who was employed in the Habershon-Brock partnership. The partnership were prolific in the mid-19th century; most of their work was on Anglican churches such as the new St Helen's Church at Ore, St Andrew's Church (now demolished) in central Hastings and the former St Peter's Church at Baldslow, and further afield in Sussex in places such as Hove (St John the Baptist's Church), Ebernoe, Copthorne, Ashurst Wood and Scaynes Hill.

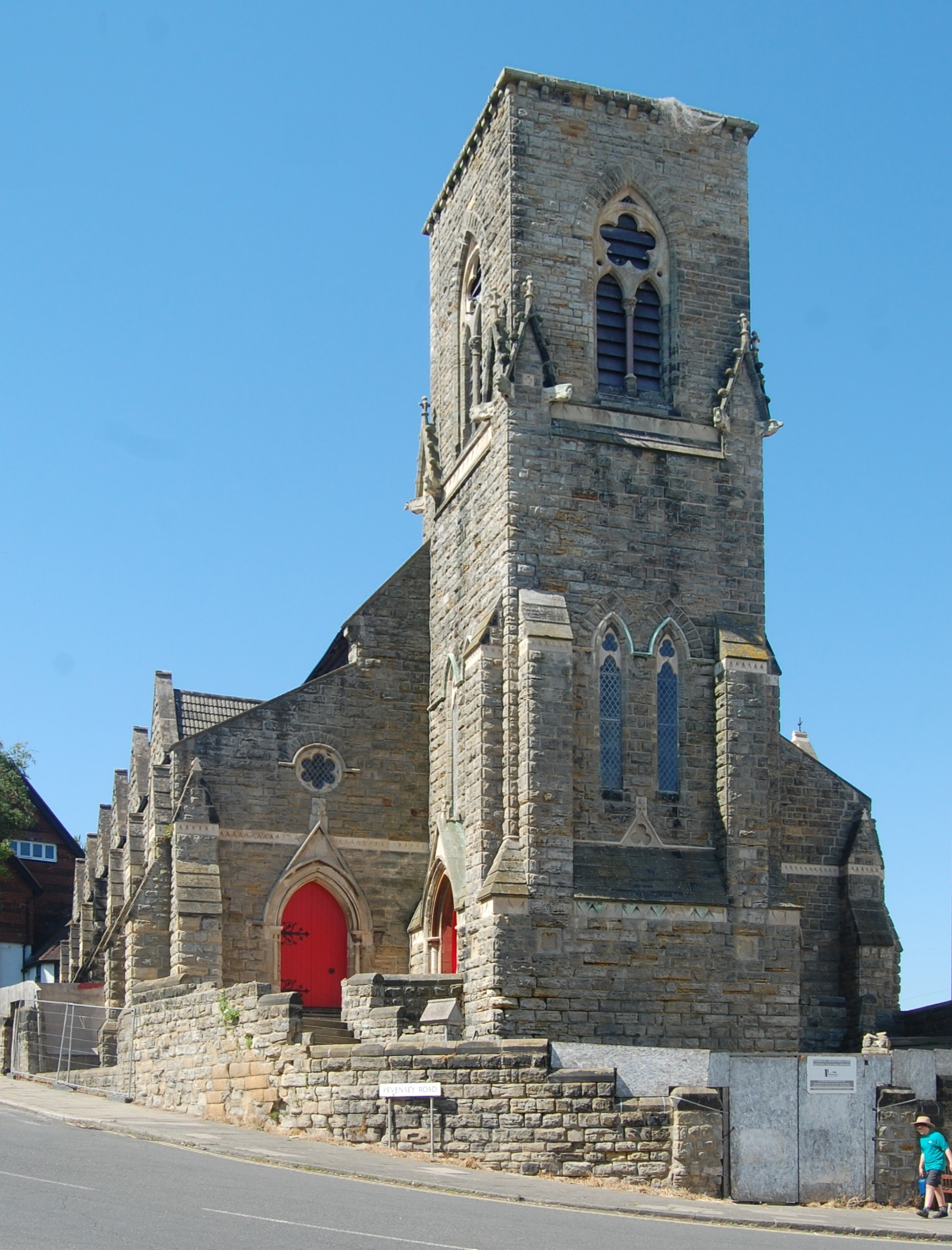
The church faces the junction of two roads and is a local landmark.

The church formed a landmark on the main road, especially in conjunction with the old and new Christ Churches slightly further down the hill towards the seafront, and particularly after its copper spire was added. Over time, though, its exposed situation led to wind and sea-spray damaging the oak-shingled roof; the shingles were replaced by tiles in the 20th century. A more sudden weather event then caused more severe damage in 1987. The Great Storm of the night of 15/16 October wrecked the spire, which had to be removed soon afterwards. (A United Reformed church in Hastings, St Luke's at Silverhill, also had its spire destroyed in the same storm.)

The church founded a mission hall in the Silverhill suburb in 1892. The incumbent, Reverend Freeman, built a tin tabernacle on Sedlescombe Road South, and Congregational services were held there until the mid-1940s. The building was demolished in 1966. Later, the Congregational Church in England merged with various Presbyterian churches to form the United Reformed Church denomination in 1972. St Leonards-on-Sea Congregational Church declined to join the new denomination and instead joined the Congregational Federation, a group formed of churches which had opted to remain separate.

In the years after the storm, the structure continued to deteriorate, and damage caused by a series of burglaries in 2002 caused the building's insurance contract to be withdrawn. The congregation stopped using the church for worship in 2002, after which vandalism and continued weathering accelerated its decline into dereliction. The building was officially classed as disused from 2008.

The former church was listed at Grade II by English Heritage on 10 September 2003; this defines it as a "nationally important" building of "special interest". As of February 2001, it was one of 521 Grade II listed buildings, and 535 listed buildings of all grades, in the borough of Hastings. Hastings Borough Council enacted a "fast-track" policy to get the building listed quickly by English Heritage, giving it some protection against alteration or demolition. It is one of several listed churches in St Leonards-on-Sea: three Anglican churches (Christ Church, St John the Evangelist's and St Peter's) have the higher Grade II* status; and other Grade II-listed churches are St Leonard's Anglican church, St Leonard's Baptist Church, St Mary Magdalene's Church (now Greek Orthodox) and the Roman Catholic Church of St Thomas of Canterbury and English Martyrs. Under its former name of St Leonards Congregational Church, it had been licensed for worship in accordance with the Places of Worship Registration Act 1855 with the registration number 16637.

== Architecture ==
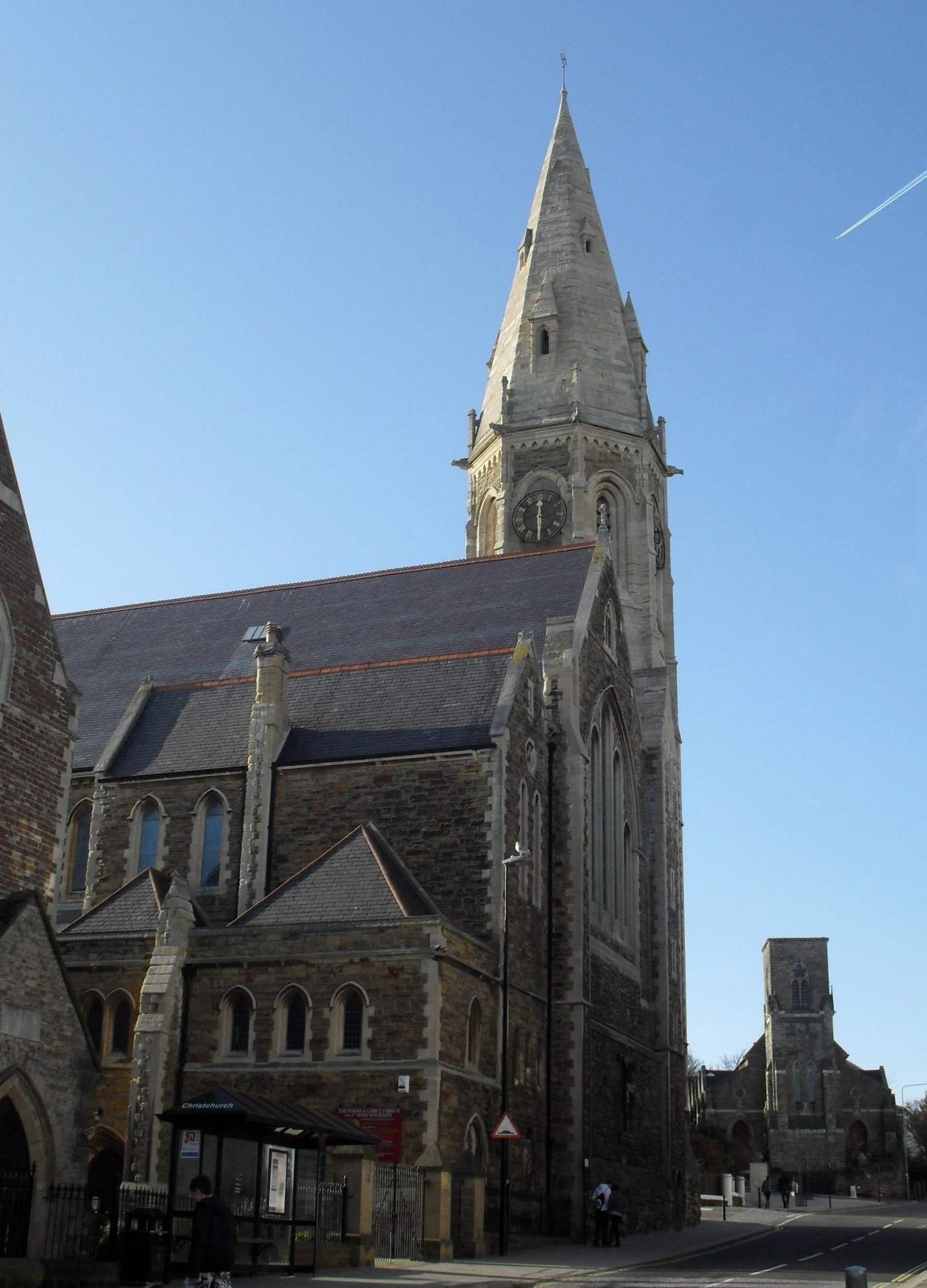
The view at the junction of London Road and Kings Road in St Leonards-on-Sea "presents ... a fascinating array of 19th-century church architecture". The former and present Christ Churches are in the foreground; the former Congregational Church is up the hill in the background.

The prevalence of Nonconformist worship in Sussex caused many chapels to be built in the 18th and 19th centuries. Although many architectural styles were represented, most buildings were simple, matched the local vernacular and used plain materials such as brick and weatherboarding. The church at St Leonards-on-Sea, with its bold tower and spire, cross-gabling and pale sandstone exterior, was a departure from these typical forms, and has been described as both "one of the most ambitious" and "one of the finest Nonconformist buildings in Sussex".

The exterior is of sandstone quarried at Ore, donated by the church's sponsor Thomas Spalding and laid in courses. This is supplemented by some Bath stonework. The roof is tiled, but was covered with wooden shingles until they deteriorated. The layout takes advantage of the steeply sloping site by incorporating a schoolroom and hall below the body of the church but still at ground level on the ritual south (London Road; geographical east) side. The plan consists of a tower at the ritual west (geographical south) end, leading into a six-bay combined nave and chancel with aisles on each side, a clerestory, a vestry and the lower-level hall on the ritual south side.

The tower is of three slightly tapering stages. At the top, there are lancet windows and a cinquefoil (five-lobed) window flanked by colonnettes of granite. Trefoil and lancet windows on the middle stage are accompanied by gargoyles and stone pilasters.

On both sides, the aisles have six cross-gables (corresponding to the bays of the nave), below which are trefoil and quatrefoil windows with intricate tracery and stained glass. The clerestory above also has trefoil-headed windows. Structural stability is improved by a series of buttresses with stone facing and gabled tops between each bay. The hall, which has an exterior wall only on the London Road side because of the slope of the land, also has arch-headed trefoil windows and stone dressings. The vestry at the ritual east (geographical north) end rises to two storeys. The cross-gabling effect on the aisles has been described as a "highly effective" architectural feature.

Inside, the ends of the nave near the entrances have decorative panels with arched and moulded headers. Similar treatment is given to the glazed doors. The main entrance is through the lowest stage of the tower, which leads into a lobby whose floor is laid in a "classic Gothic Revival form" with encaustic and geometric tiles. The wooden roof has arch- and cross-braces. Other timberwork includes the reredos between the body of the church and the vestry, a gallery with a balustraded staircase and built-in clock, box pews and a pulpit with some wrought ironwork.

== See also ==
- List of places of worship in Hastings
- Media related to St Leonards-on-Sea Congregational Church at Wikimedia Commons

== Bibliography ==
- Brooks, Ken (2004). Around Hastings Then and Now. St Leonards-on-Sea: Ken Brooks. ISBN 0-9540513-2-7.
- Buckle, Alan G. (2003). An Independent Chapel: The Story of St Luke's in Silverhill 1853–2003. Hastings: Hastings Local History Group.
- Elleray, D. Robert (1979). Hastings: a Pictorial History. Chichester: Phillimore & Co. ISBN 0-85033-324-5.
- Elleray, D. Robert (1981). The Victorian Churches of Sussex. Chichester: Phillimore & Co. Ltd. ISBN 0-85033-378-4.
- Elleray, D. Robert (2004). Sussex Places of Worship. Worthing: Optimus Books. ISBN 0-9533132-7-1.
- Knight, Andrew (1986). The Railways of South East England. Shepperton: Ian Allan Ltd. ISBN 0-7110-1556-2.
- Manwaring Baines, J. (1990) [1956]. Burton's St Leonards (2nd ed.). Hastings: Hastings Museum.
- Stell, Christopher (2002). Nonconformist Chapels and Meeting-houses in Eastern England. Swindon: English Heritage. ISBN 1-873592-50-7.
