= Christ Church, St Leonards-on-Sea =

Christ Church
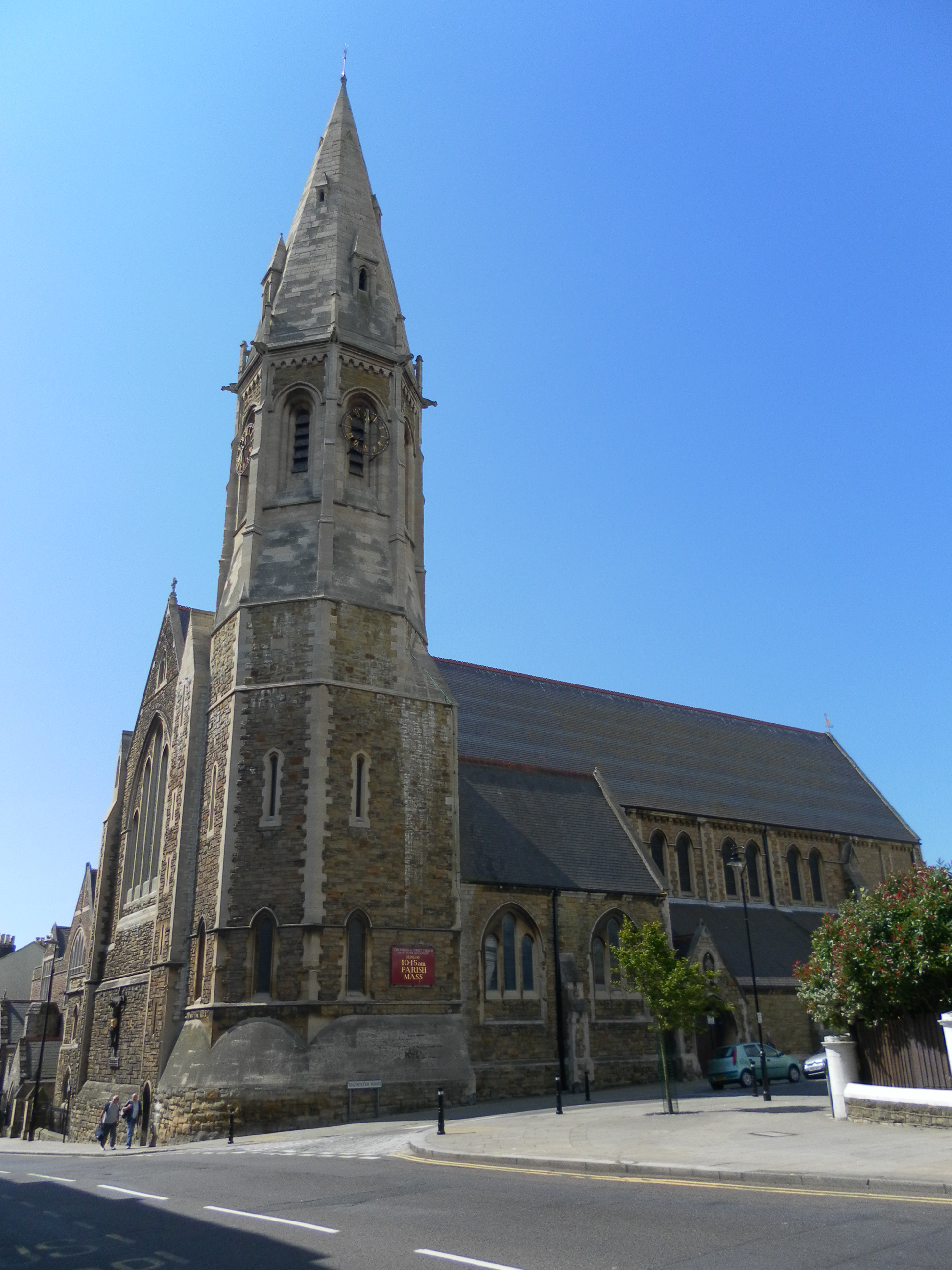
- The church from the northeast
- Christ Church
- 50.8538°N 0.5593°E
- Location: London Road/Silchester Road, St Leonards-on-Sea, Hastings, East Sussex TN37 6AY
- Country: England
- Denomination: Anglican
- Churchmanship: Anglo-Catholic
- Website: www.christchurchstleonards.co.uk

History
- Status: Parish church
- Founded: 1860 (original church); 1873 (present church)
- Founder: Lady St John
- Dedicated: 13 May 1875
- Consecrated: 20 November 1884

Architecture
- Functional status: Active
- Heritage designation: Grade II*
- Designated: 14 September 1976
- Architect: Arthur Blomfield
- Style: Early English Gothic Revival
- Completed: 9 September 1860 (original church); 5 February 1895 (present church, including tower and spire)

Specifications
- Capacity: 1,000
- Materials: Sandstone, rock and rubble

Administration
- Archdiocese: Lewes and Hastings
- Diocese: Diocese of Chichester
- Deanery: Hastings
- Parish: St Leonards-on-Sea: Christ Church and St Mary Magdalen [sic]

Clergy
- Rector: Revd Thomas Crowley

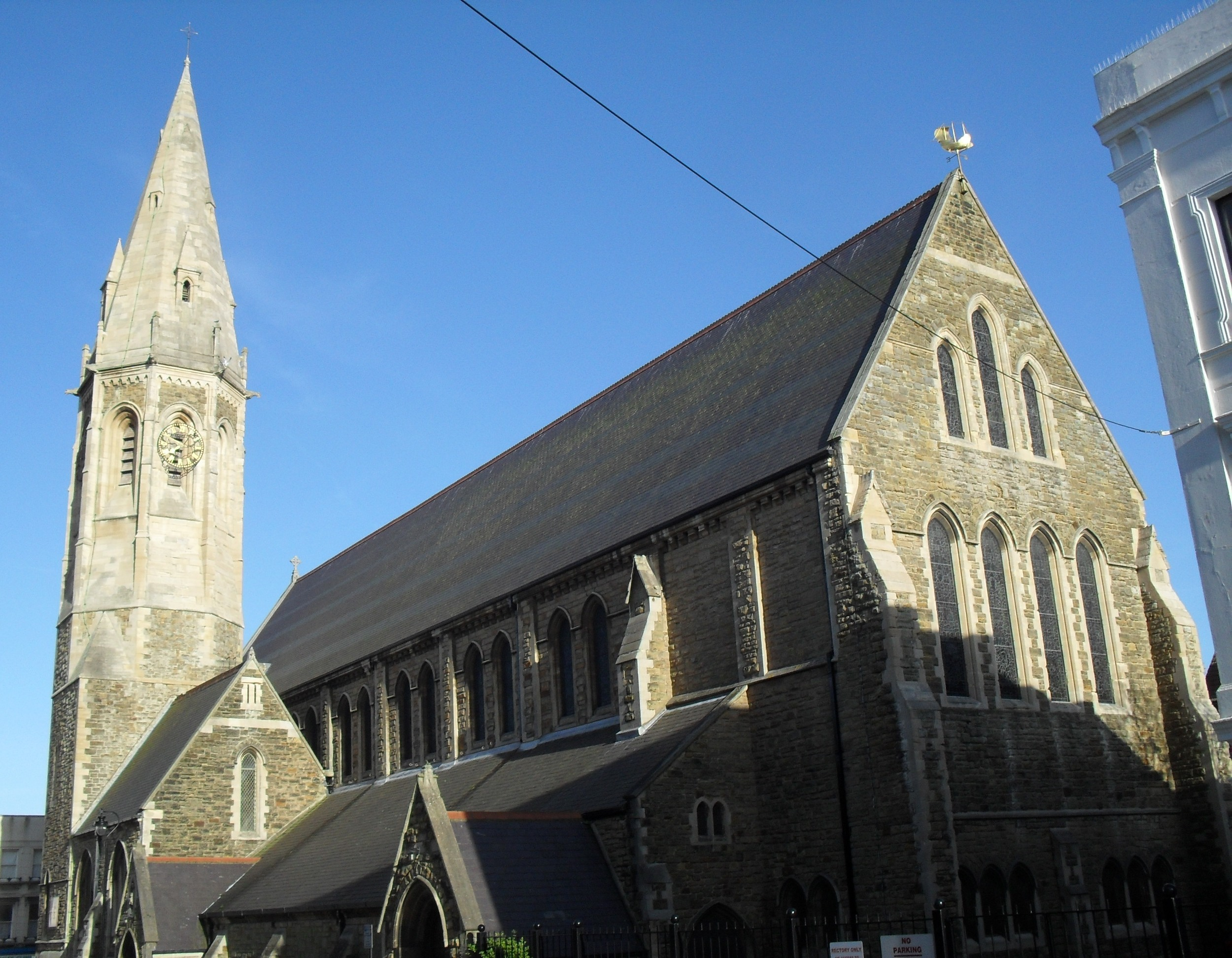
The west end was extended in the early 20th century.

Christ Church is an Anglican church in the town and seaside resort of St Leonards-on-Sea, part of the Borough of Hastings in East Sussex, England. Opened as the town's third Anglican church in 1860 to serve a rapidly developing residential area and to accommodate poor worshippers who could not afford pew rents at the fashionable St Leonard's and St Mary Magdalene's Churches, the original building was superseded by a much larger church built next to it between 1873 and 1875. Prolific ecclesiastical architect Sir Arthur Blomfield's simple Gothic Revival design forms a landmark on one of St Leonards-on-Sea's main roads, continues to serve a large area of the town (including the former parish of the now closed St Mary Magdalene's Church) and maintains a strong Anglo-Catholic tradition. It has been described as Blomfield's "finest achievement in Sussex" and "one of the main centres of Anglo-Catholic worship in Southern England". The interior fittings are the best of any church in the borough, and the design has been called one of Blomfield's most successful. St John the Evangelist's Church, founded as a daughter church nearby in 1865, also continues to thrive as a separate parish church. Historic England has listed Christ Church at Grade II* for its architectural and historical importance.

== History ==
The seaside town of Hastings, founded in the 8th century, developed as an important trading hub, ecclesiastical centre and the chief Cinque Port by the Middle Ages. There were seven churches by the end of the 13th century. All but two vanished by the 18th century, but after a period of decline the town grew in importance again from that time and was a fashionable resort by the 1820s. In that decade, builder and speculator James Burton bought land immediately to the west from the Eversfield baronets and founded a high-class new town, designed to his specifications. St Leonards-on-Sea, which took its name from one of the ancient churches of Hastings, grew rapidly in size and popularity, rivalling its older neighbour by the mid-19th century.

The new community had two Anglican churches of its own by 1858: Burton himself founded St Leonard's parish church in 1831, and St Mary Magdalene's Church was built in 1858. Neither were suitable for the large numbers of poor and working-class people who had been attracted to the town to work in domestic service, shops and on the railway, or the labourers who built the town and lived there temporarily: the churches charged pew rents and were patronised by wealthy residents and visitors. The nearest church with free sittings, the Church in the Wood, was several miles away in Hollington village.

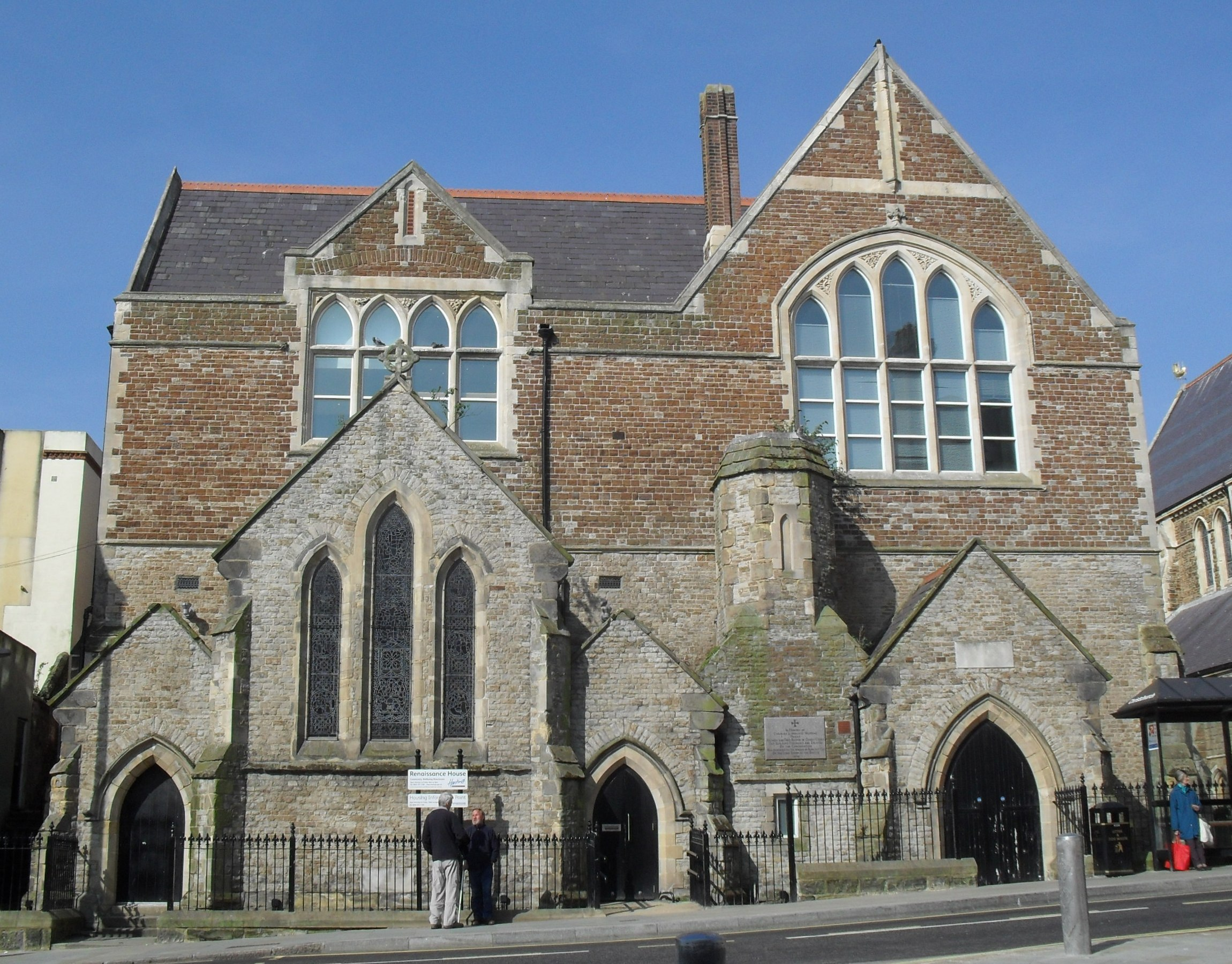
The original church, opened in 1860, stood to the south of the present building.

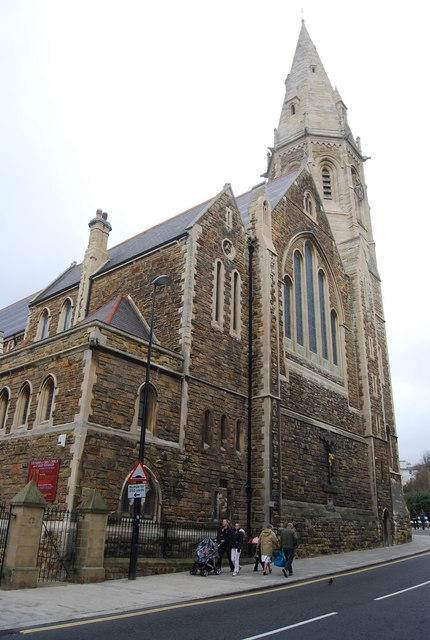
English Heritage stated that the building, whose east end stands on the steep London Road, is a "large, complex town church" with an "impressive exterior".

Countess Waldegrave was a local benefactor who paid for many improvements to the religious and social life in Hastings and St Leonards-on-Sea in the 19th century. Holy Trinity Church was built in central Hastings at her expense in 1857–58. Its site had been a wasteland which was home to hundreds of itinerant workers and poor people who lived in shacks; they were displaced when the church was built, and many had to move to St Leonards-on-Sea, exacerbating the problem of a lack of accommodation for worship. Lady St John (Louisa Boughton), the widow of Sir John Vaughan and St Andrew St John, 14th Baron St John of Bletso and a friend of Countess Waldegrave, was concerned by the situation, and paid for a new church for central St Leonards-on-Sea which would be free of pew rents. Built on the site of a former quarry and paid for entirely by Lady St John, Christ Church opened on 9 September 1860 and was served by clergy from St Mary Magdalene's Church. It was an Early English Gothic Revival-style sandstone building with a small bell-tower. Stone to build it was taken from the quarry.

Lady St John's son, Rev. Charles Lyndhurst Vaughan, became the first permanent vicar of the church in 1863 after moving from St Neots in Cambridgeshire. Despite early opposition, particularly to his introduction of High church Anglo-Catholic ritual and ceremony to services, he became influential and well-respected in the church and town. His early works included founding a daughter church in the newly developed Upper St Leonards in 1865—St John the Evangelist's Church is still in use as a separate parish church—and opening church schools in 1873. In the same year, he founded a new, much larger church next to the original building. The old Christ Church was frequently full, even though St John the Evangelist's Church had provided extra capacity in the north of the town, and Vaughan believed that a 1,000-capacity building would be needed. Alexander Beresford Hope mp pc laid the foundation stone of the new building, which was built on derelict land adjoining the north end of the old church, on 6 November 1873—the feast day of Saint Leonard. Construction continued throughout 1874, when the Lady chapel, baptistery, nave walls and clerestory were erected, and in 1875 Vaughan decided to open the church for worship despite its incomplete state. A temporary roof was added, and work on the planned tower and spire was postponed. The designer was Sir Arthur Blomfield, who usually worked in the Early English Gothic Revival style and designed many churches in Sussex and elsewhere. A "distinguished" and prolific architect of the Victorian era, his other churches included All Souls in Hastings, a rebuild of St John the Evangelist's Church in Upper St Leonards, and others in central Brighton and that town's Queen's Park area, Roffey, Bexhill, Hunston and Worthing. In 1875, Christ Church's magazine described Blomfield's design as "the simplest form of early Gothic". The builders were Dove & Co. of Isleworth.

The new building was dedicated on 13 May 1875, its first day of public service. It could not be consecrated at that time, though, as debts from the building work were still outstanding. These debts, and the church itself, still therefore belonged to Fr Vaughan. All the required money was raised by October 1884, and the Bishop of Chichester The Right Reverend Richard Durnford conducted the consecration ceremony on 20 November 1884. Further structural additions were made during the rest of the 19th century: timber flooring and an alabaster altar were added in 1890 and 1891 respectively, and the long-awaited tower and spire were erected soon after a building fund was started in 1888. Work began in 1894 and was completed in time for a dedication ceremony on 5 February 1895. Some of the bells and an iron cross which surmounted the spire was given as memorials by people associated with the church. In the next decade, stained glass was installed in the clerestory windows, a new font was acquired and the church commemorated Fr Vaughan (who had died in 1895) with a brass monument and a Calvary. The church was extended at the west end with an organ chamber in 1919–20, although the original plans were more ambitious: a war memorial chapel, a new (and much grander) entrance and a baptistery were intended. Designs were drawn up by architect Temple Moore, but the cost was found to be too great and some money already raised was donated to a fund established to build a hospital in Hastings. A memorial chapel was built within the body of the church instead, and architect Leslie Thomas Moore (a partner of Temple Moore, but no relation) designed a reredos, altar, marble memorial pillar and other decorative elements. It was dedicated as the Chapel of the Holy Souls on 24 April 1921. Further improvements, which opened out the interior, added a new marble floor and wooden choir stalls, and defined the sanctuary more clearly, were carried out in 1933. William Milner and Romilly Craze's work cost £850.

The church was only slightly damaged during World War II despite frequent bombing raids on St Leonards-on-Sea, although services had to be held in the Lady chapel and later in the basement vestries. Structural defects were found after the war, though, especially in the roof; this required emergency repairs, partly covered by an anonymous donation. Most work was complete by 1951, although some of the windows were then found to be defective. During this time, many eminent visitors appeared at the church to encourage fundraising efforts and chair discussions and meetings: the well-connected rector of the time, Rev. Sir Percy Maryon-Wilson, 12th Baronet (who inherited his title in 1944) invited friends such as Sir David Bowes-Lyon and John Betjeman. Maryon-Wilson, the church's longest-serving rector, died in 1964 and was commemorated by the creation of a memorial garden and the founding of a new church in the Kinondoni District of Dar es Salaam, Tanzania. Also named Christ Church, it was opened in 1968.

St Mary Magdalene's Church, which had opened nearby in 1858, was declared redundant by the Diocese of Chichester in 1980 and was sold to the Greek Orthodox community. Christ Church's parish was extended to absorb the former parish of that church, and the parish legal name was changed to Christ Church and St Mary Magdalen [sic].

== Architecture ==
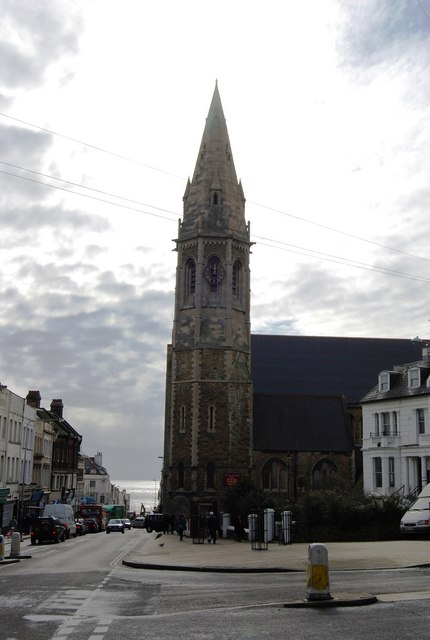
Christ Church's landmark tower was completed and dedicated in 1895.

The original church of 1860 was a sandstone-built Early English Gothic Revival building, and Arthur Blomfield's new church was a much larger and more ambitious, although still simple, version of the same style. Built mostly of rubble and sandstone with rock and stone dressings, its plan consists of a six-bay nave with arcades and a clerestory, chancel, aisles to the north and south sides (the north aisle being apsidal), transepts, Lady chapel, vestries below the body of the church (due to the slope of the land), a memorial chapel, an organ chamber, two porches, a tower and a stone spire. It is a very long and tall church, especially inside. The "impressive" buttressed east end faces the main London Road and has a five-light lancet window and paired lancets below the gable. To the northeast, the partly ashlar-faced tower rises in four stages with an octagonal upper stage containing bells. There are also lancets, lucarnes and stone gargoyle carvings. The peal of eight bells were installed in 1894 and were first sounded on 23 February 1895. The floor of the bell stage is of steel and Portland stone. The tower is of Bath Stone with a Portland stone roof and rises to 119 3/4 feet (36.5 m); the spire adds a further 64 1/2 feet (19.7 m), and the 9 3/4-foot (3.0 m) cross on top takes the total height to 189 feet (58 m). The bells were cast by Gillett & Johnston.

The two interior chapels are both decorated with frescoes. The Lady Chapel has a Madonna of the Magnificat, an Annunciation and images of various female saints surrounding Jesus and Mary. The designs are attributed to Bodley and Hare. The Chapel of the Holy Souls (war memorial chapel) features Abraham meeting Melchizedek and three saints defeating the Angel of Darkness. There is also a sculpture of Saint Martin. The sanctuary also has frescoes representing an array of saints. Some were again executed by Bodley and Hare in 1908 as copies of the originals, which dated from 1883 but suffered fading.

The set of stained glass windows is extensive and "outstanding". Most was provided by the Burlison and Grylls and Heaton, Butler and Bayne firms. The east window alone features images of cherubim, the Holy Women, Apostles, Martyrs, Magi, Archangels, Archbishops and Doctors of the early Church, Prophets, soldier-saints, seraphim, hermits, monks and friars, all presented at the Adoration of the Heavenly Court.

== The church today ==
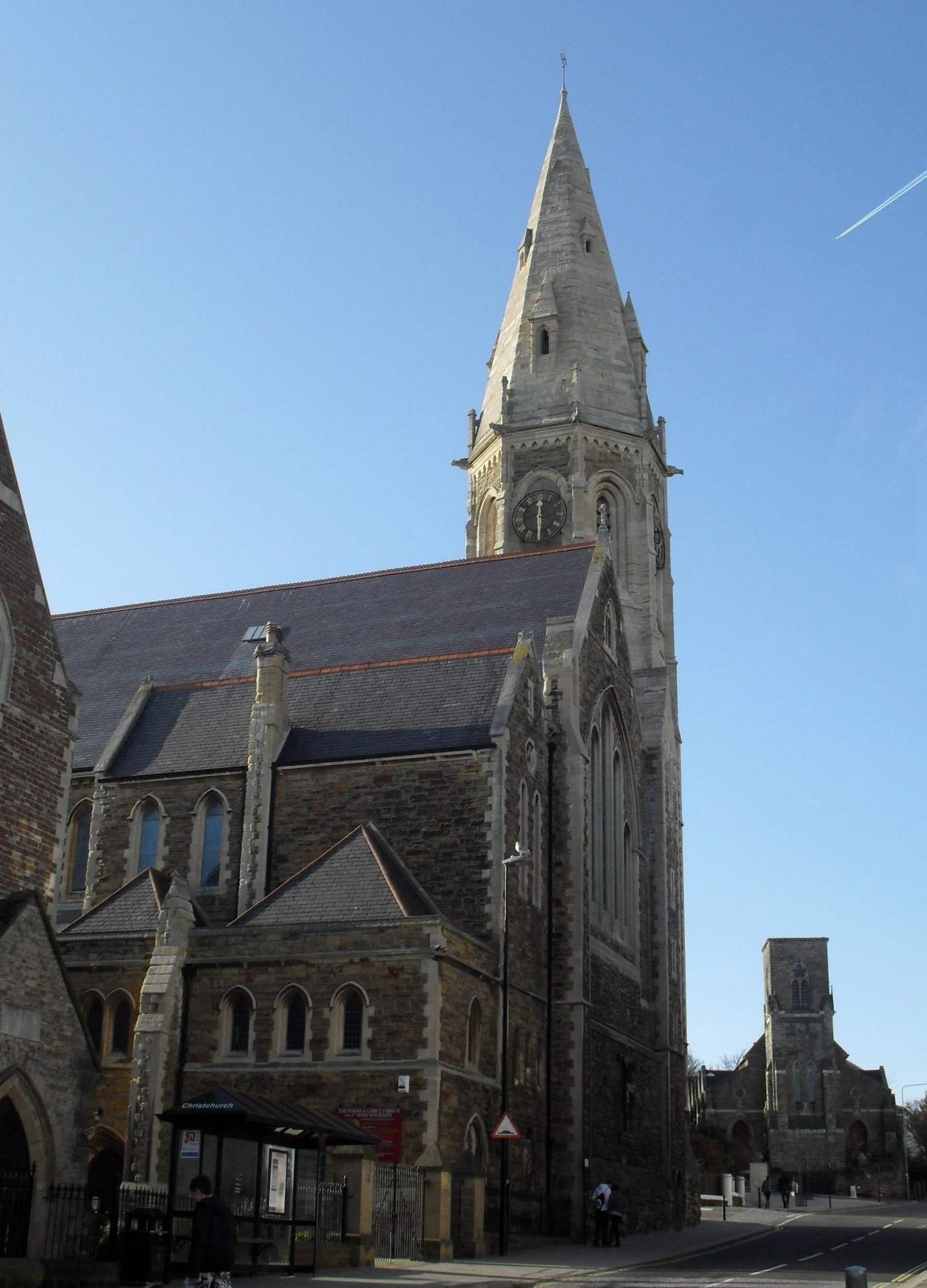
The old and new Christ Churches (foreground and midground respectively) stand alongside their near-contemporary, the former St Leonards-on-Sea Congregational Church (background), closed in 2008.

Christ Church was listed at Grade II* by Historic England on 14 September 1976. This defines it as a "particularly important" building of "more than special interest". As of February 2001, it was one of 13 Grade II* listed buildings, and 535 listed buildings of all grades, in the borough of Hastings. Its former daughter church, St John the Evangelist's, is also listed at Grade II*, as is the nearby St Peter's Church; other churches with listed status in St Leonards-on-Sea are St Leonard's Anglican church, St Leonard's Baptist Church, St Mary Magdalene's Church (now Greek Orthodox), the Roman Catholic Church of St Thomas of Canterbury and English Martyrs and the former St Leonards-on-Sea Congregational Church further up London Road. Each of these have the lower Grade II status.

The parish, which includes that of the former St Mary Magdalene's Church on St Margaret's Road, covers central St Leonards-on-Sea. Its boundaries are Gensing Road, Kenilworth Road, Pevensey Road, Clyde Road, London Road, Warrior Gardens, Edward Road, the railway line between St Leonards Warrior Square and Hastings railway stations, Falaise Road and the English Channel coast.

Many services are offered weekly, all with a strong Anglo-Catholic character. There is a daily Mass, two Masses on a Sunday morning (the main Mass is preceded by the Exposition of the Blessed Sacrament) and various prayer services. The Sacrament of Reconciliation, a rite principally associated with the Roman Catholic Church, is also offered. The parish has asked for alternative episcopal oversight from a bishop of The Society (currently Martin Warner, Bishop of Chichester) on the grounds it rejects the ordination of women to the priesthood and episcopate.

The original (1860) church building was converted into a parish hall, and was also used as a theological centre and for some of Christ Church School's activities. It was refurbished in 2002.

Christ Church continues to be one of the most recognisable landmarks in the town, and London Road "presents the visitor with a fascinating array of 19th-century church architecture". The old and new churches stand together, and higher up the hill to the north the former St Leonards-on-Sea Congregational Church (closed 2008) looks down on them. Described as one of the finest and most ambitious Nonconformist churches in Sussex, the 1863 structure lost its distinctive spire in the Great Storm of 1987.

== See also ==
- List of places of worship in Hastings

== Bibliography ==
- Brooks, Ken (2004). Around Hastings Then and Now. St Leonards-on-Sea: Ken Brooks. ISBN 0-9540513-2-7.
- Elleray, D. Robert (1979). Hastings: a Pictorial History. Chichester: Phillimore & Co. ISBN 0-85033-324-5.
- Elleray, D. Robert (1981). The Victorian Churches of Sussex. Chichester: Phillimore & Co. Ltd. ISBN 0-85033-378-4.
- Elleray, D. Robert (2004). Sussex Places of Worship. Worthing: Optimus Books. ISBN 0-9533132-7-1.
- Funnell, Barry (1975). Christ Church, St Leonards-on-Sea: 1859–1975. St Leonards-on-Sea: Budd & Gillatt.
- Manwaring Baines, J. (1990) [1956]. Burton's St Leonards (2nd ed.). Hastings: Hastings Museum.
- Marchant, Rex (1997). Hastings Past. Chichester: Phillimore & Co. ISBN 1-86077-046-0.
- Nairn, Ian; Pevsner, Nikolaus (1965). The Buildings of England: Sussex. Harmondsworth: Penguin Books. ISBN 0-14-071028-0.
- Salzman, L.F., ed. (1973) [1937]. A History of Sussex. The Victoria Histories of the Counties of England. Vol. 9. Folkestone: Dawsons of Pall Mall (originally Oxford: Oxford University Press). ISBN 0-7129-0590-1.
- Thornton, David (1987). Hastings: a Living History. Hastings: The Hastings Publishing Co. ISBN 0-9512201-0-1.
