= St Peter's Church, St Leonards-on-Sea =

Sonrise Church at St Peter's
- St Peter's and St Paul's Church
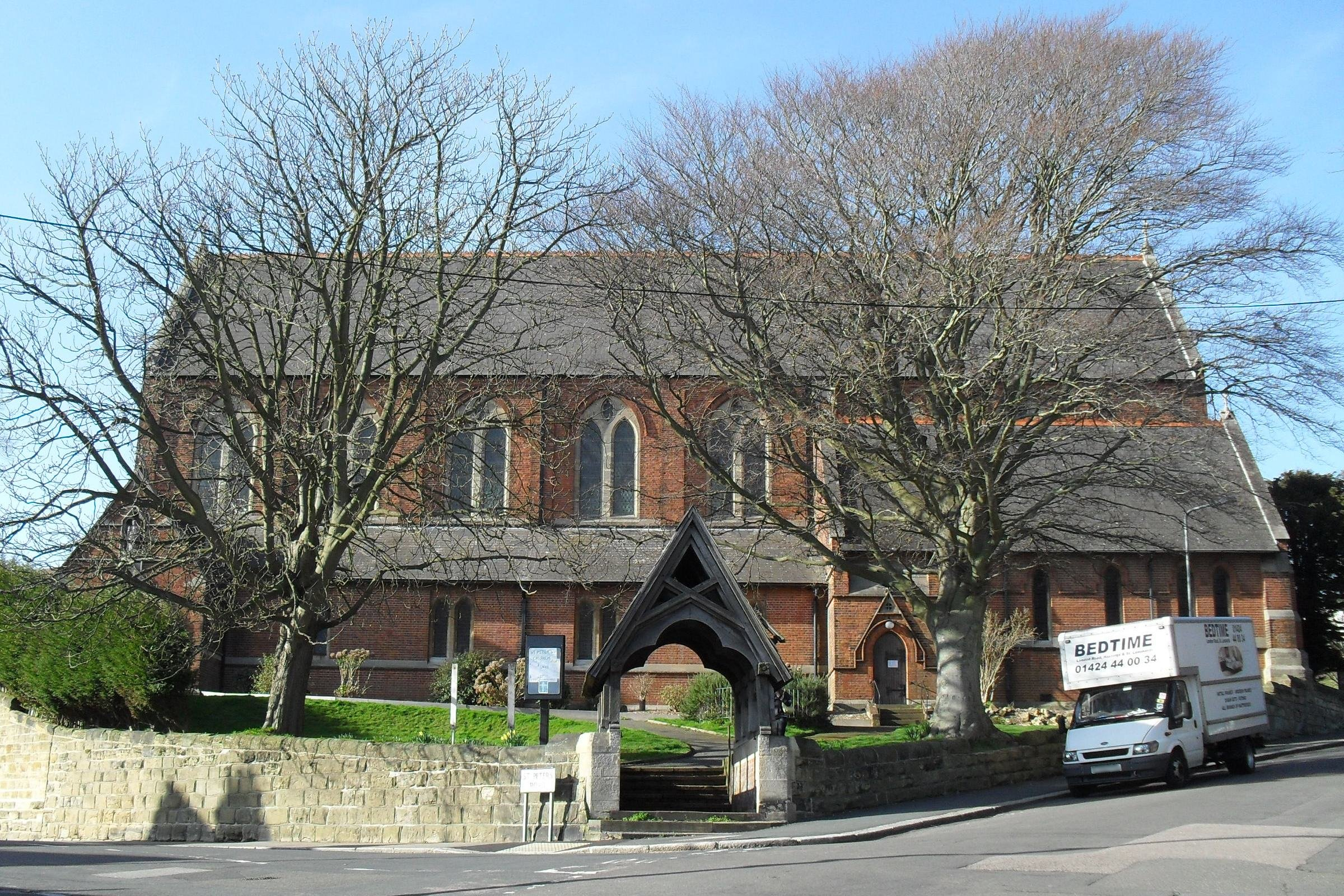
- The church from the south
- Sonrise Church at St Peter's
- 50.8608°N 0.5614°E
- Location: St Peter's Road/Cornfield Terrace, St Leonards-on-Sea, Hastings, East Sussex TN37 6RA
- Country: England
- Denomination: Independent Evangelical
- Previous denomination: Anglican

History
- Status: Church
- Founded: 1883
- Founder: Blanche E. Elliott (benefactor)
- Events: 1 November 2011: declared redundant by Diocese of Chichester; 10 February 2016: registered for the use of Sonrise Church

Architecture
- Functional status: Active
- Heritage designation: Grade II*
- Designated: 14 September 1976
- Architect: James Brooks
- Style: Early English Gothic Revival
- Completed: 1885
- Construction cost: Approx. £11,000

Administration
- Archdiocese: Lewes and Hastings (until 2011)
- Diocese: Diocese of Chichester (until 2011)
- Deanery: Hastings (until 2011)
- Parish: St Leonards-on-Sea: Christ Church and St Mary Magdalen [sic] (until 2011)

St Peter's Church is a former Anglican church in the Bohemia area of the town and seaside resort of St Leonards-on-Sea, part of the Borough of Hastings in East Sussex, England. Founded in 1883 in response to the rapid residential growth of this part of St Leonards-on-Sea, the "outstanding late Victorian church" was completed and opened in 1885. Architect James Brooks was towards the end of his career but still produced a successful, powerful Gothic Revival design, which was built by prolific local firm John Howell & Son—builders of several other churches in the area.

After the closure and demolition of the nearby St Paul's Church and the merging of the parishes, the legal names of the parish and church were changed to St Peter's and St Paul's Church. The church came to national attention in 2009 when its long-serving vicar was arrested for organising sham marriages. The church was declared redundant by the Diocese of Chichester in 2011; since 2010 it has been home to Sonrise Church—an independent Evangelical congregation. English Heritage has listed it at Grade II* for its architectural and historical importance.

== History ==
St Leonards-on-Sea experienced continuous rapid growth after it was founded in 1828 by London-based builder and speculator James Burton. The seaside resort, immediately west of the ancient port of Hastings, had a 2/3-mile (1.1 km) esplanade with high-class buildings facing the English Channel, but also extended a long way inland by the late 19th century as housing was built up the wooded valley which formed part of the land Burton bought in 1828. Three Anglican churches were built in the resort's early years—St Leonard's (1831), St Mary Magdalene's Church (1858) and Christ Church (1860)—and a fourth, dedicated to St Paul, was built on the newly developed Church Road in 1868.

Further growth around the Bohemia Road, leading to the Silverhill suburb of Hastings, occurred over the next 20 years. Blanche E. Elliott, a worshipper at St Paul's Church, donated £14,300 to allow another church to be founded to serve that area. Its foundation stone was laid by Lady Brassey on 4 August 1883. The Hastings-based firm of John Howell & Son were responsible for building the church to the design of James Brooks, "one of the most respected Victorian church architects", whose reputation was forged by his work on well-designed, inexpensive churches in central London in the 1860s. The original design featured a tower and spire, which were never built.

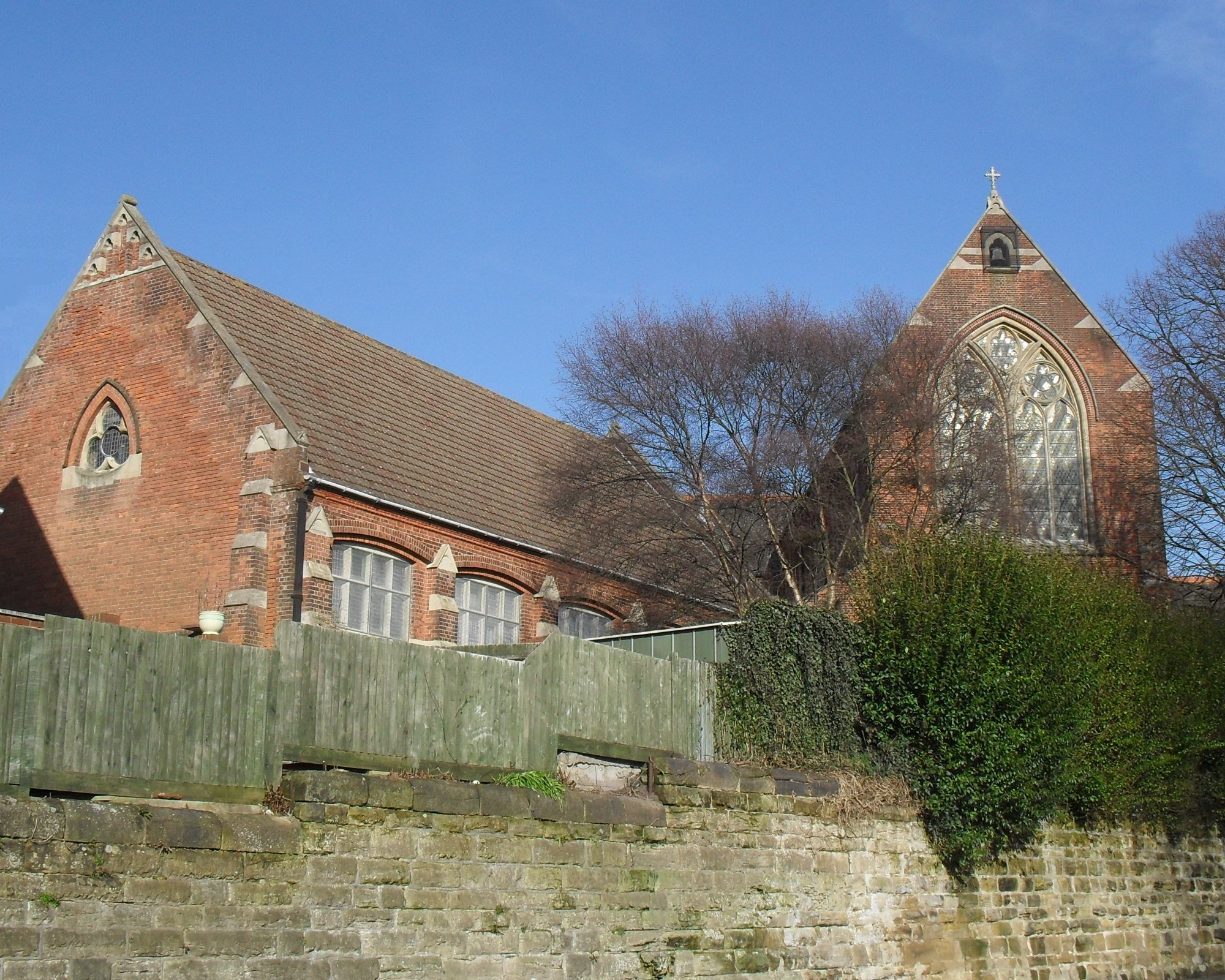
The west end is adjacent to a Gothic Revival church hall, probably also designed by James Brooks.

The church was ready in 1885, and opened for worship in that year. The eventual cost exceeded £11,000. It was allocated a parish immediately, carved out of St Paul's Church's parish. The two churches served the local area together for the next 80 years, but in 1964 St Paul's was closed and demolished (this has been described as "the most grievous loss among the Victorian churches of Hastings"). The parishes were combined thereafter under the name St Peter and St Paul. (There is an unrelated church named St Peter and St Paul's Church, opened in 1969, in the Silverhill Park suburb of Hastings.)

In July 2009, the vicar—who had served the church for 20 years—was arrested at his rectory near the church on suspicion of conducting about 180 sham marriages which allowed illegal immigrants to stay in the country. The trial of Rev. Alex Brown and two other defendants began in June 2010 and concluded in September 2010 with the three men being jailed for four years each. About 360 marriages at the church between 2005 and 2009 were eventually identified as sham.

== Architecture ==
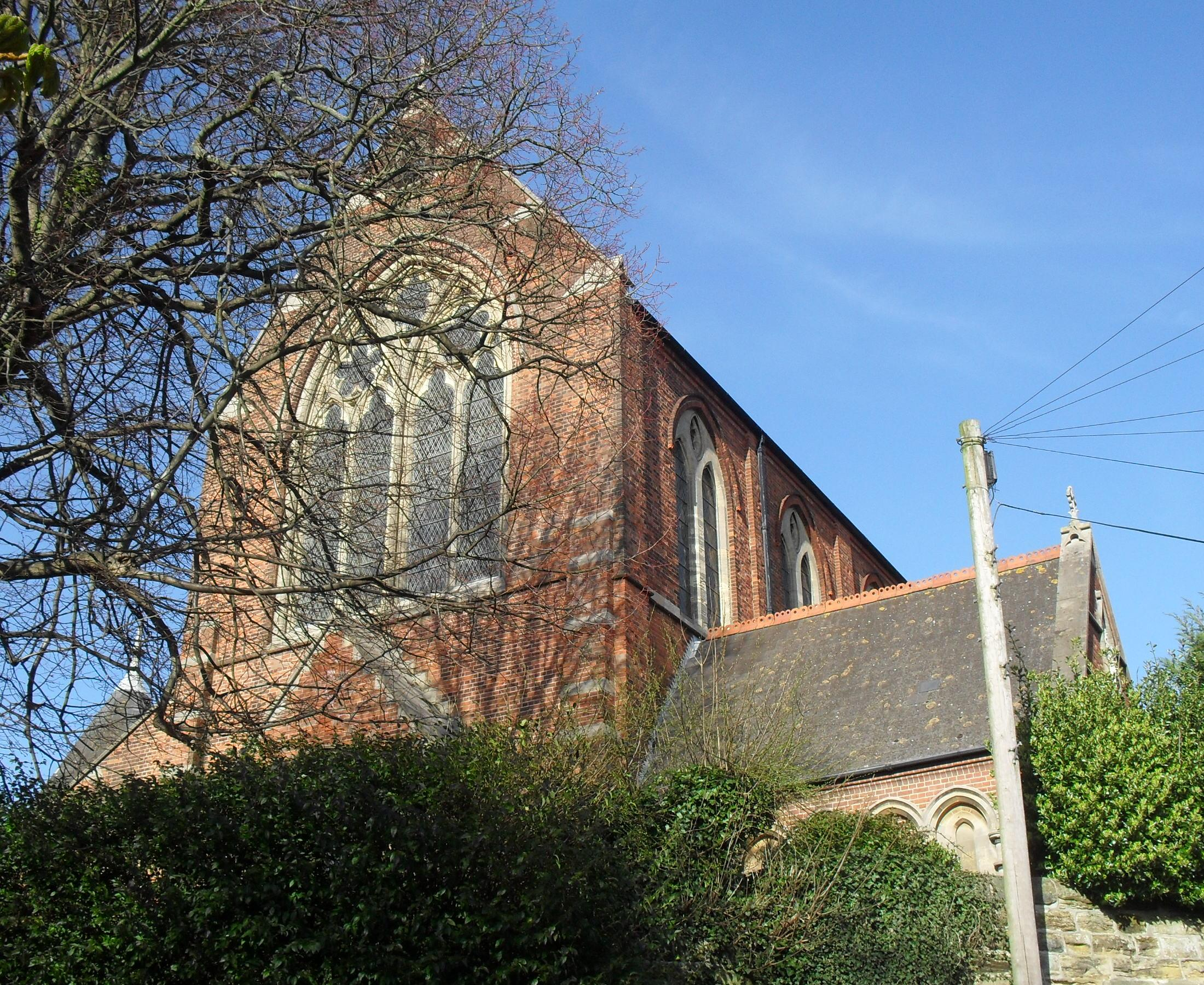
The west end has a four-light lancet window and quatrefoils.

James Brooks made his reputation designing "large and economical churches" in inner London, which combined simple, well-proportioned Gothic Revival designs (usually in brick) with interesting architectural touches. These features are also in evidence at St Peter's Church, even though he was working with a less restricted budget than he often had to in London. It is an Early English Gothic Revival-style red-brick building with lancet windows which feature extensive plate tracery. The walls have some limestone as well, and the roof is laid with slates and red clay tiles. The plan consists of a two-bay chancel and nave separated by a chancel arch which almost reaches the church roof—making the interior a unified composition—a clerestory and aisles on each side of the nave, porches on the south and west sides, a side chapel, vestry with an organ-chamber above (reached by a stair-turret) and a baptistery with a polygonal apse.

The clerestory has tall paired lancet windows and is very tall, making the aisles and their pointed-arched arcades low. There are similar two-light windows to the vestry and its organ-chamber, which is gabled. The baptistery at the northwest end has a vaulted conical roof with moulding in a dog-tooth pattern. Both the west and the east windows are composed of large groups of lancets (five and four respectively) with spandrels and hood moulds. The west window, set above one of the entrance porches, also has mullions and quatrefoil lights. The interior walls are of uncovered red brick, except in the chancel where much use is made of alabaster as a facing material. The piers of the five-bay arcades separating the nave from the aisles are also of brick with stone capitals. Their shape—a continuation of the round piers combined with a cut-off pyramid shape—were described by Nikolaus Pevsner as "a true innovation". Fittings include an alabaster lectern and pulpit, considered by English Heritage to be "the most impressive feature". Together with the chancel screen, these fixtures are of pink and grey alabaster and have prominent dog-tooth mouldings and corbels. There is also a tall gabled reredos depicting the crucifixion of a fully clothed Christ. It was created to Brooks's designs by Harry Hems in 1895. Three sedilia and an attached piscina are situated under a hood mould on the chancel wall.

Northwest of the church are the former church hall and vicarage (now in secular use as the Streatfeild House Day Care Centre). These may have been designed at the same time as the church by Brooks. The hall has some Gothic Revival touches, principally the pointed-arched windows. The vicarage is also in the Early English Gothic Revival style and has irregular fenestration and tile-hanging.

== The church today ==
St Peter's Church was listed at Grade II* by English Heritage on 14 September 1976. This defines it as a "particularly important" building of "more than special interest". As of February 2001, it was one of 13 Grade II* listed buildings, and 535 listed buildings of all grades, in the borough of Hastings. Two other Anglican churches in St Leonards-on-Sea, St John the Evangelist's and Christ Church, are also listed at Grade II*; other churches with listed status in the town are St Leonard's Anglican church, St Leonard's Baptist Church, St Mary Magdalene's Church (now Greek Orthodox), the Roman Catholic Church of St Thomas of Canterbury and English Martyrs and the former St Leonards-on-Sea Congregational Church further up London Road. Each of these have the lower Grade II status.

The parish covered a large area of the north of St Leonards-on-Sea. The boundaries are St Leonards Warrior Square railway station, Warrior Gardens, Edward Road, Magdalen Road, the railway line between St Leonards Warrior Square and Hastings railway stations, Linton Road, Lower Park Road, part of Alexandra Park, Newgate Road, Tower Road, St Peter's Road and Woodland Vale Road.

The Diocese of Chichester declared the church redundant with effect from 1 November 2011. Since the previous year, it had been used by Sonrise Church—an Evangelical congregation—and it was registered for marriages on their behalf in February 2016. Sonrise Church was originally associated with the Christian Outreach Centre movement (Note: Locally, this group has churches in Eastbourne and Portslade.) and was founded on a small scale in St Leonards-on-Sea in September 2000. Continuous growth led to the use of larger buildings in the borough of Hastings, including the former St Mary-in-the-Castle Church, until the church was able to move into St Peter's Church in 2010. Although now an independent Evangelical church, Sonrise Church belongs to the Evangelical Alliance.

== See also ==
- List of places of worship in Hastings

== Bibliography ==
- Elleray, D. Robert (1979). Hastings: a Pictorial History. Chichester: Phillimore & Co. ISBN 0-85033-324-5.
- Elleray, D. Robert (2004). Sussex Places of Worship. Worthing: Optimus Books. ISBN 0-9533132-7-1.
- Manwaring Baines, J. (1990) [1956]. Burton's St Leonards (2nd ed.). Hastings: Hastings Museum.
- Nairn, Ian; Pevsner, Nikolaus (1965). The Buildings of England: Sussex. Harmondsworth: Penguin Books. ISBN 0-14-071028-0.
- Salzman, L.F., ed. (1973) [1937]. A History of Sussex. The Victoria Histories of the Counties of England. Vol. 9. Folkestone: Dawsons of Pall Mall (originally Oxford: Oxford University Press). ISBN 0-7129-0590-1.
