= Baston Lodge =

Italianate villa in St Leanards-on-Sea, Hastings, East Sussex, England

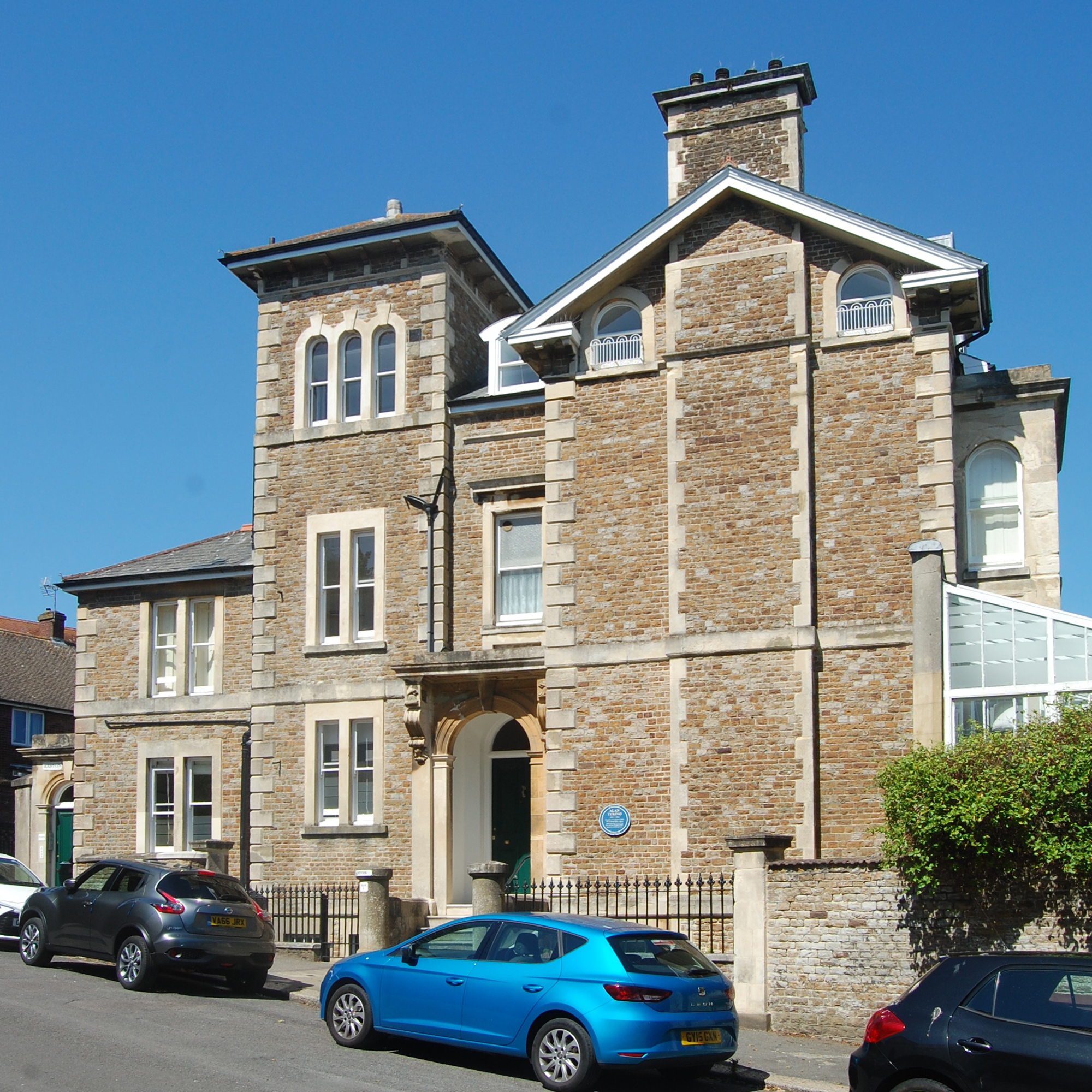
- View of the entrance on Maze Hill

- Location within East Sussex

General information
- Type: Residential villa
- Location: 1 Upper Maze Hill, St Leonards-on-Sea, Hastings, East Sussex, England
- Coordinates: 50°51′19″N 0°33′12″E
- Completed: 1850
- Owner: Baston Lodge Freehold Ltd.
- Management: Baston Lodge Freehold Ltd.

Listed Building – Grade II
- Official name: Baston Lodge
- Designated: 14 March 1973

Height
- Architectural: Italianate architecture

Technical details
- Floor count: 2 (+ attic & basement)

Design and construction
- Architect: Decimus Burton
- Main contractor: John Ward

Baston Lodge is a residential villa in St Leonards-on-Sea, Hastings, East Sussex, southern England.

The building was designed by Decimus Burton (1800–1881) as a seaside villa for John Ward, a friend, and completed in 1850. The architecture is in the Italianate style, with coursed stone, chamfered quoins, and plain stone architraves and bands. It has low-pitched slate roofs with two main storeys, an attic, and a basement. There is a three-storey tower with a low-pitched pyramid-shaped roof.

Baston Lodge was the childhood home of the World War II codebreaker Alan Turing (1912–1954) and there is a blue plaque on the front of the building commemorating this. Alan Turing and his elder brother John Turing were wards of Colonel and Mrs Ward.

The building was Grade II listed in 1973. The blue plaque commemorating Alan Turing was unveiled on 23 June 2012, the centenary of Turing's birth.

The villa is located at 1 Upper Maze Hill and is close to St John's Church to the north. Immediately to the west is St Michael's Hospice and to the south is St Leonards Gardens. The building is now divided into apartments and the freehold of the building is owned by Baston Lodge Freehold Ltd.

== See also ==
- Baston, a village in Lincolnshire, England
