= St Leodegar's Church, Hunston =

St Leodegar's Church
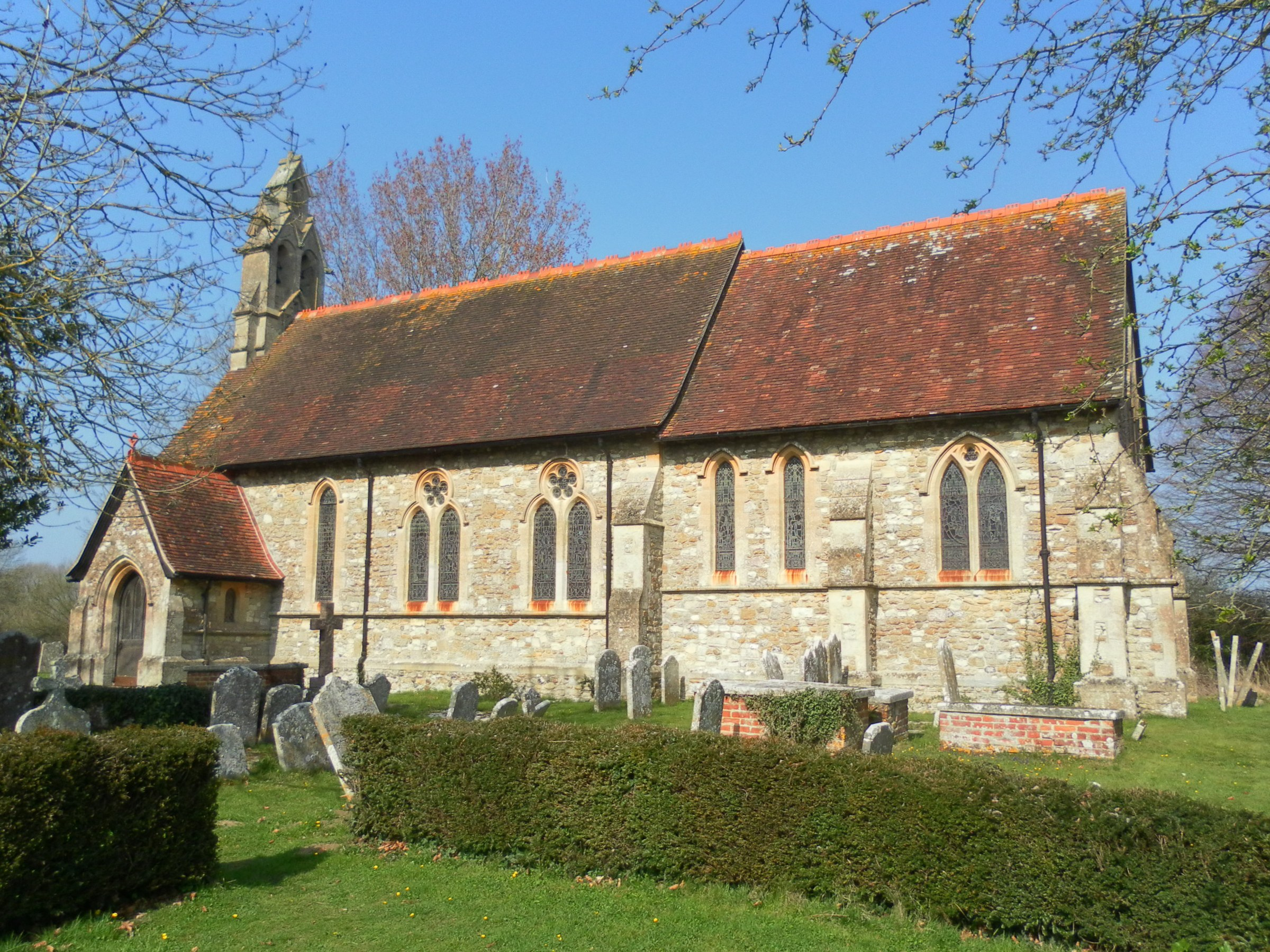
- The church from the southwest

- Location of the church within West Sussex
- 50.8065°N 0.7742°W
- Location: Church Lane, Hunston, West Sussex
- Country: England
- Denomination: Anglican

History
- Status: Parish church
- Founded: c. 12th century
- Dedication: Leodegar
- Consecrated: 22 October 1885
- Events: 25 March 1885: original ruined church demolished

Architecture
- Functional status: Active
- Architect: Arthur Blomfield
- Style: Early English Gothic Revival
- Groundbreaking: 1885 (present building)
- Completed: 1885 (present building)
- Construction cost: £4,500 (£500,000 in 2025))

Administration
- Diocese: Diocese of Chichester
- Archdeaconry: Archdeaconry of Chichester
- Deanery: Rural Deanery of Chichester
- Parish: Hunston

Clergy
- Rector: Rev. James Russell

St Leodegar's Church is the Anglican parish church of Hunston, a hamlet in the Chichester district of West Sussex, England. The dedication—rare in England and unique in Sussex—has also been spelt St Ledger historically. A ruinous church dating from the 12th century was dismantled and rebuilt by prolific ecclesiastical architect Arthur Blomfield in 1885, but some old features were retained. The building, an Early English Gothic Revival structure of stone, was criticised by architectural historian Nikolaus Pevsner but was built on a "generous" budget and has some elaborate structural features such as a double belfry.

== History ==
Hunston is a large, spread-out village on the coastal plain south of the city of Chichester. "Good wheat-growing land" surrounds the residential development in the 1,013-acre (410 ha) parish. A church has served the village since the 12th century or earlier: in 1105 it was granted by Robert de Haye to Lessay Abbey in Normandy. Its dedication to St Leodegar, the 7th-century bishop of Autun, may derive from this French connection. Bishop Leodegar (c. 616–678), sometimes anglicised to Leger or Latinised as Leodegarius, was martyred by having his tongue and eyes pulled out and being beheaded. Boxgrove Priory, a few miles away and also a possession of Lessay Abbey, administered the church until the Reformation in the 16th century.

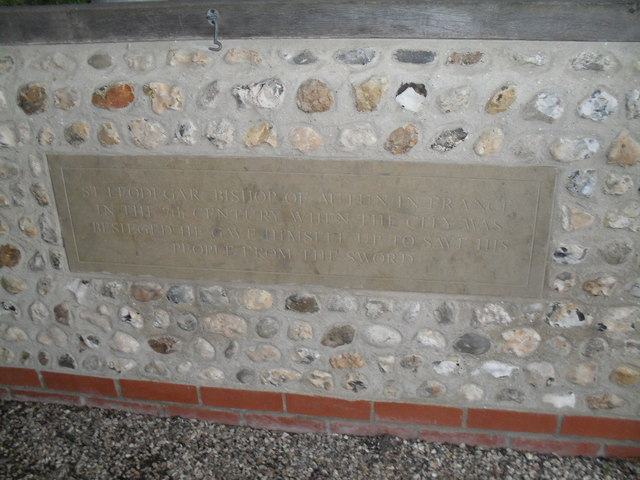
A plaque in the lychgate of the churchyard explains St Leodegar's martyrdom.

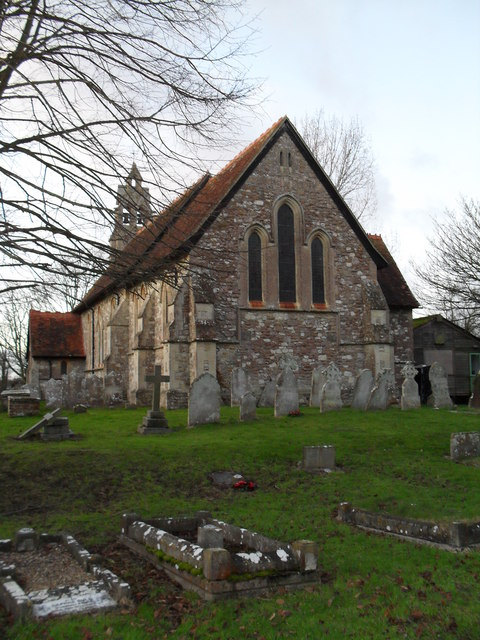
The nave is aisleless, and there is a south porch.

The old church was well documented in the 18th and 19th centuries. Its rector between 1719 and 1759, Charles Covert, did work on the chancel during his incumbency. The antiquarian Sir William Burrell, 2nd Baronet, who visited most of Sussex's parish churches during the 18th century, recorded St Leodegar's Church as having a chancel and a nave with a south aisle. It was pictured and described again 16 years later in The Gentleman's Magazine: there was a flat-arched entrance in the west wall and an older (apparently 12th-century) south door with Norman-style chevron moulding, a continuous roof over the nave and south aisle, a three-bay pointed-arched round-columned arcade separating the aisle and nave, and lancet windows throughout. The church was said to be "in so decayed a state that its utter ruin seems unavoidable before long". Similar features were depicted in sketches by other artists in the 19th century, including one dated c. 1851 by Richard Henry Nibbs in which the nave and chancel were clearly in ruinous condition. His accompanying notes bore this out. A survey of Sussex churches by John Mason Neale and Benjamin Webb in 1841 noted that there were wall murals inside in the form of painted Biblical verses.

In 1851, the creation of a joint benefice formally united St Leodegar's Church with St Stephen's Church in neighbouring North Mundham. In early 1885, church officials decided to demolish St Leodegar's Church and build a replacement. Work to knock down the old building started on 25 March 1885, and the site was cleared ready for the replacement to be erected. Arthur Blomfield was commissioned, perhaps because he had restored the church at North Mundham two years previously. A prolific church architect who worked extensively in Sussex—usually in the Gothic Revival style—this was one of about ten new churches he designed in the county: others include St Andrew's Church, Worthing, All Saints Church, Roffey, St Luke's Church, Queen's Park, Brighton, Christ Church, St Leonards-on-Sea, St John the Evangelist's Church, St Leonards-on-Sea and All Souls Church, Hastings. Construction work took about six months, and on 22 October 1885 the new building—also dedicated to St Leodegar—was consecrated by Bishop of Chichester Richard Durnford. Blomfield was able to work to "quite a generous budget for a relatively modest rural church": £4,500 (£500,000 in 2025)) was raised by the incumbent, Rev. Fletcher, and his family. The building had a capacity of 100.

The parish covers a rural area centred on the hamlet of Hunston and bisected by the north–south B2145 (Selsey–Chichester) road. Donnington and North Mundham villages lie to the west and east respectively. It is part of a joint benefice with St Stephen's Church at North Mundham and St Giles' Church at Merston, which closed in 2010.

The advowson (the right to appoint clergy) was held by Boxgrove Priory on behalf of Lessay Abbey between 1105 and the Dissolution of the Monasteries. It then passed to Thomas Bowyer, who held North Mundham church and manor, and to later rectors. The patron of the church is now St John's College, Cambridge.

The dedication to St Leodegar is rare in England. Five churches in England bear it, and Hunston's is the only one in either West or East Sussex. Another example is the 12th-century St Leodegarius Church in Basford, Nottinghamshire.

== Architecture ==
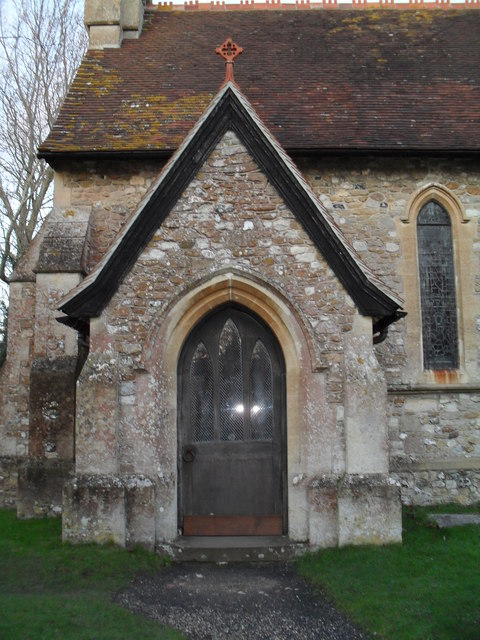
The gabled porch is at the southwest corner.

The new St Leodegar's Church stands on the same site as its medieval predecessor, next to the 17th-century manor house in an isolated position south of the village. Although Victorian restorations of dilapidated ancient churches were very common in Sussex, demolitions and complete reconstructions did not happen very often—although other examples do exist. It is a stone-built church in the Early English Gothic Revival style, with a chancel, aisleless nave, vestry, entrance porch and elaborate bellcote. All windows are lancets. Some old burial vaults survive from the ancient church, but they are now in the churchyard next to the south nave wall; they were previously in the south aisle, which was not included in the narrower design of the new church. The bellcote has two bells taken from the old church: one has the initials gw cw, and the other is plain. The bellcote has carved gargoyles. The nave and chancel are separated by a tall chancel arch with moulded shafts, and the triple-lancet east window is set in a recessed arch flanked by marble shafts.

There is a complete scheme of stained glass by James Powell and Sons, installed between 1885 and 1892. Based on the Te Deum, the scenes include the Ascension, the Cherubim and Seraphim, the Apostles, the Prophets, Christian martyrs, and Saints Ambrose and Augustine. James Powell was also responsible for the reredos. Other fixtures include a neo-Norman font of the 19th century and a contemporary piscina which incorporates a 13th-century bowl with carved details.

Blomfield's design has received a mixed reception from modern architectural historians. It has been called "spiky, even fussy" and in contrast to the "previous rustic simplicity" of the old church; and Nikolaus Pevsner was critical in the Sussex volume of the Buildings of England series: "[t]here are very few Sussex churches for which absolutely nothing can be said. Alas, this is one of them."

== See also ==
- List of current places of worship in Chichester (district)
- Media related to St Leodegar, Hunston at Wikimedia Commons

== Notes ==
=== Bibliography ===
- Beevers, David; Marks, Richard; Roles, John (1989). Sussex Churches and Chapels. Brighton: The Royal Pavilion, Art Gallery and Museums. ISBN 0-948723-11-4.
- Elleray, D. Robert (1981). The Victorian Churches of Sussex. Chichester: Phillimore & Co. Ltd. ISBN 0-85033-378-4.
- Elleray, D. Robert (2004). Sussex Places of Worship. Worthing: Optimus Books. ISBN 0-9533132-7-1.
- Nairn, Ian; Pevsner, Nikolaus (1965). The Buildings of England: Sussex. Harmondsworth: Penguin Books. ISBN 0-14-071028-0.
- Swinfen, Warden; Arscott, David (1984). Hidden Sussex. Brighton: BBC Radio Sussex. ISBN 0-9509510-0-5.
