= Ortolano =

Italian painter (born c. 1480)

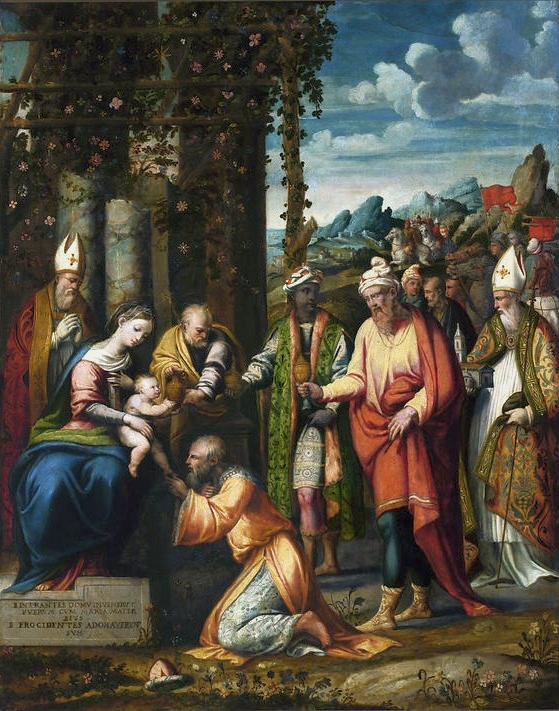
Ortolano Ferrarese, The Adoration of the Magi, National Museum in Warsaw

Ortolano was an Italian painter of the Ferrara School, active in the Renaissance period. Ticozzi cites his birth as ca. 1480.

== Biography ==
He was born in Ferrara. He was baptized Giovanni Battista Benvenuti, and he was called L'Ortolano because his father, Francisco, was a gardener. Of his career little is known, save that he was a diligent student of the works of Raphael and Bagnacavallo in 1512–1513 in Bologna.

He painted in the style of Dosso Dossi. For the church of San Niccoló he painted in 1520 the Virgin Mary and Infant Jesus with several Saints; for Santa Maria de' Servi the Nativity and in San Lorenzo, the Adoration of the Magi. From 1512 to 1524 he worked at Ferrara.

His masterpiece, a picture of rich colour and fine draughtsmanship, representing Saint Sebastian, Saint Roch and Saint Demetrius, is in the National Gallery, London. It was brought from the church of Bondeno near Ferrara in 1844, and purchased by the gallery in 1861.

In the cathedral at Ferrara are other works attributed to him, which later critics have given to Il Garofalo, but in some of the smaller churches of Ferrara, those of San Niccolò, the Servi and San Lorenzo, there are pictures which may be readily accepted as his. In the Ferrara Gallery there are a Lamentation over the Dead Christ and a Christ in the Garden . There is a Judith displaying head of Holofernes in the Cathedral of Arezzo and a Death of St. Chrysologos at the Ravenna Cathedral.
