= Hastings Museum and Art Gallery =

Museum and art gallery in East Sussex, England

Coordinates: 50.8562°N 0.5710°E

Hastings Museum & Art Gallery
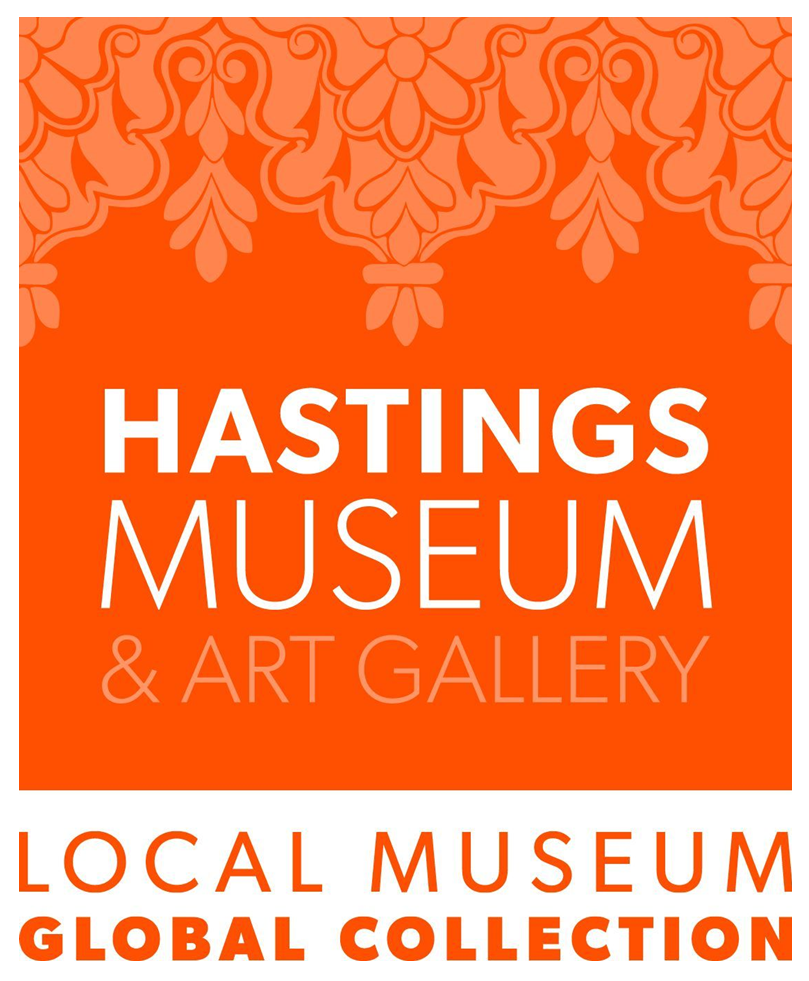

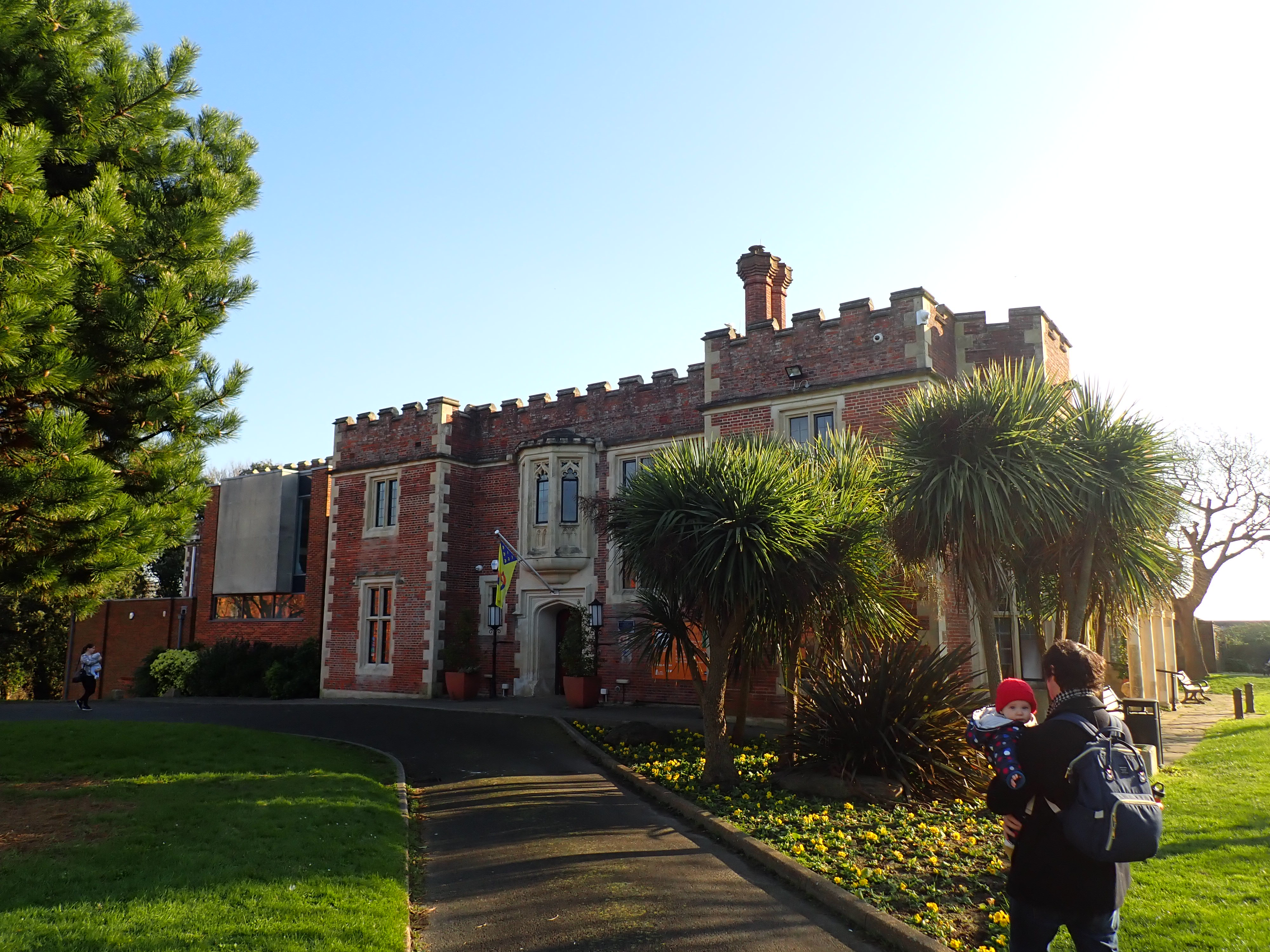
- Established: 1892
- Location: John's Place, Bohemia Road, Hastings, East Sussex, England TN34 1ET
- Type: Regional museum, art gallery, history museum, decorative arts museum, natural history museum, local museum, archaeological museum, Asian art museum, ethnographic museum
- Public transit access: Visiting the museum
- Website: www.hmag.org.uk

Hastings Museum & Art Gallery is a museum and art gallery located in, Hastings, East Sussex, England. Established in 1892, it originally resided in the Brassey Institute (now the town's library), but moved to its current location in 1927. As of 2019 it had around 97,000 objects of local history, natural sciences, fine and decorative arts, and world cultures.

The early local history gallery recounts the history of the area from prehistory to the Saxons. Local wildlife is displayed in dioramas of different local habitats, and there is a dinosaur gallery. Other galleries include local wildlife and a Native North American collection, featuring the Plains and Sub-Arctic areas and the life of Hastings-born conservationist Archibald Belaney, who adopted the name "Grey Owl".

== Building ==
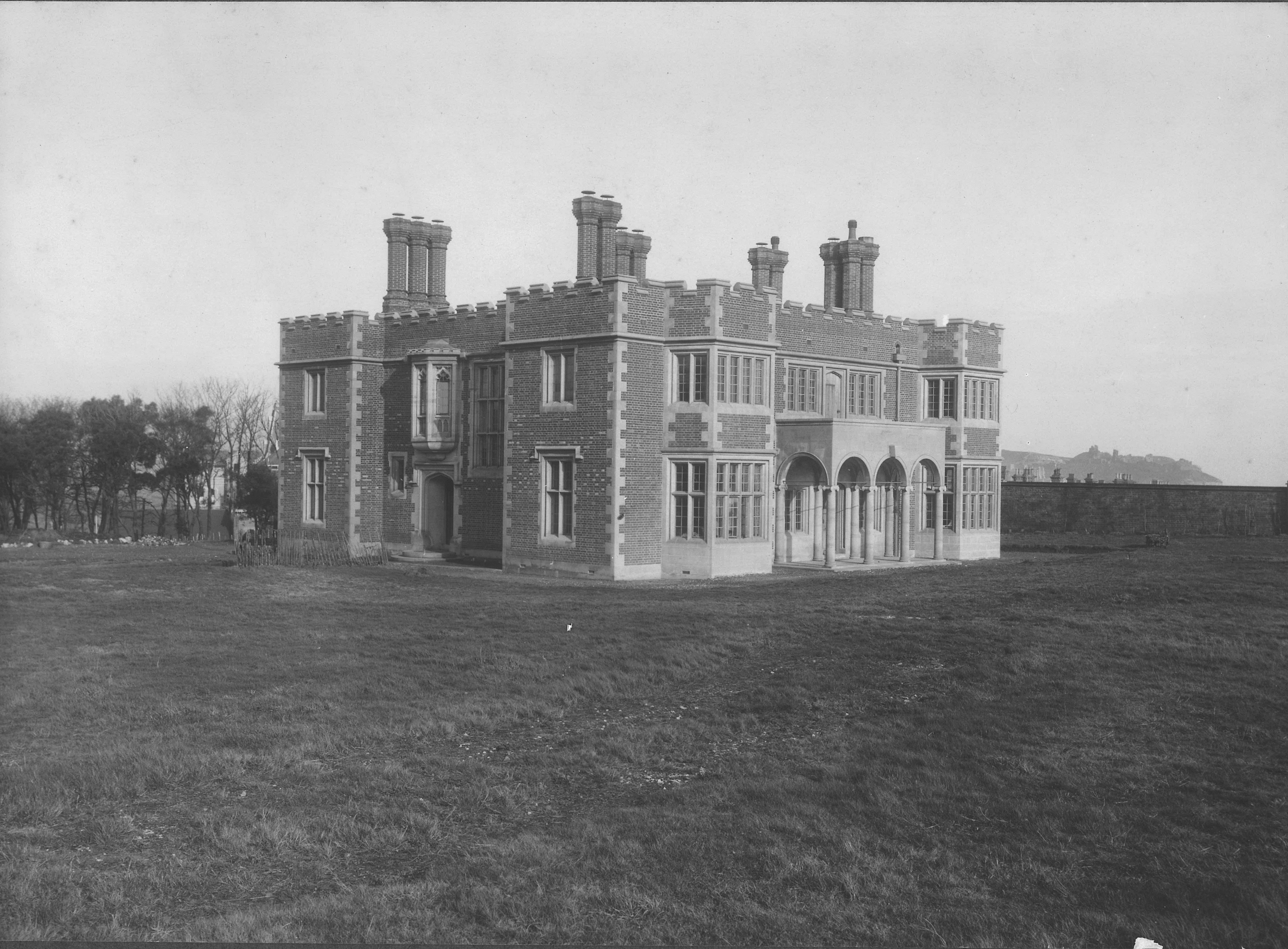
The original building as a house before becoming a museum

The museum has been based at John's place since 1928. John's Place was designed in 1923 as a private house. It made of red brick with sandstone dressings. The building has a distinctive character with a crenelated roof line, columned loggia, oriel window and studded oak doors. It was bought by Hastings Corporation and converted into the museum in 1928. In 1932 an extension was added to create an art gallery and house the Durbar Hall, part of an Indian palace built for the Indian and Colonial Exhibition of 1886. A store was added to the back of the building in similar style in 1988. A major refurbishment took place in 2006–7, funded by the Heritage Lottery Fund, which expanded the floor space by 40%, improved access and facilities and introduced environmental control and monitoring.

=== The Durbar Hall ===
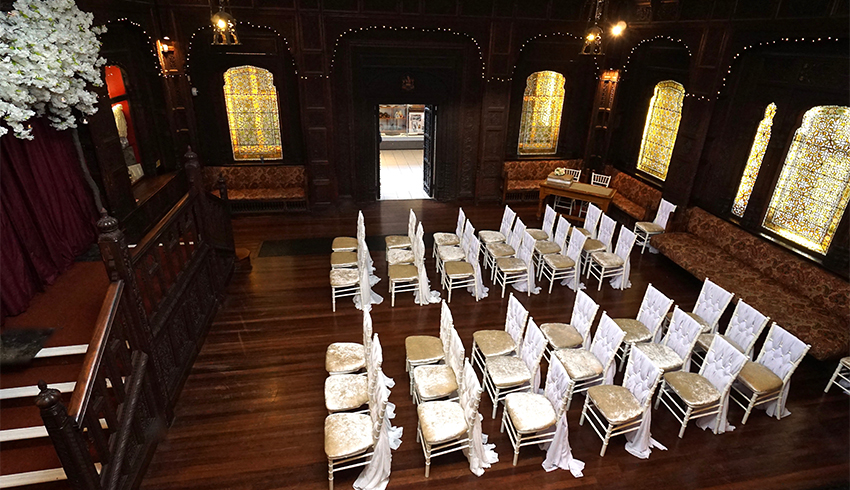
The Lower Durbar Hall set out for a wedding

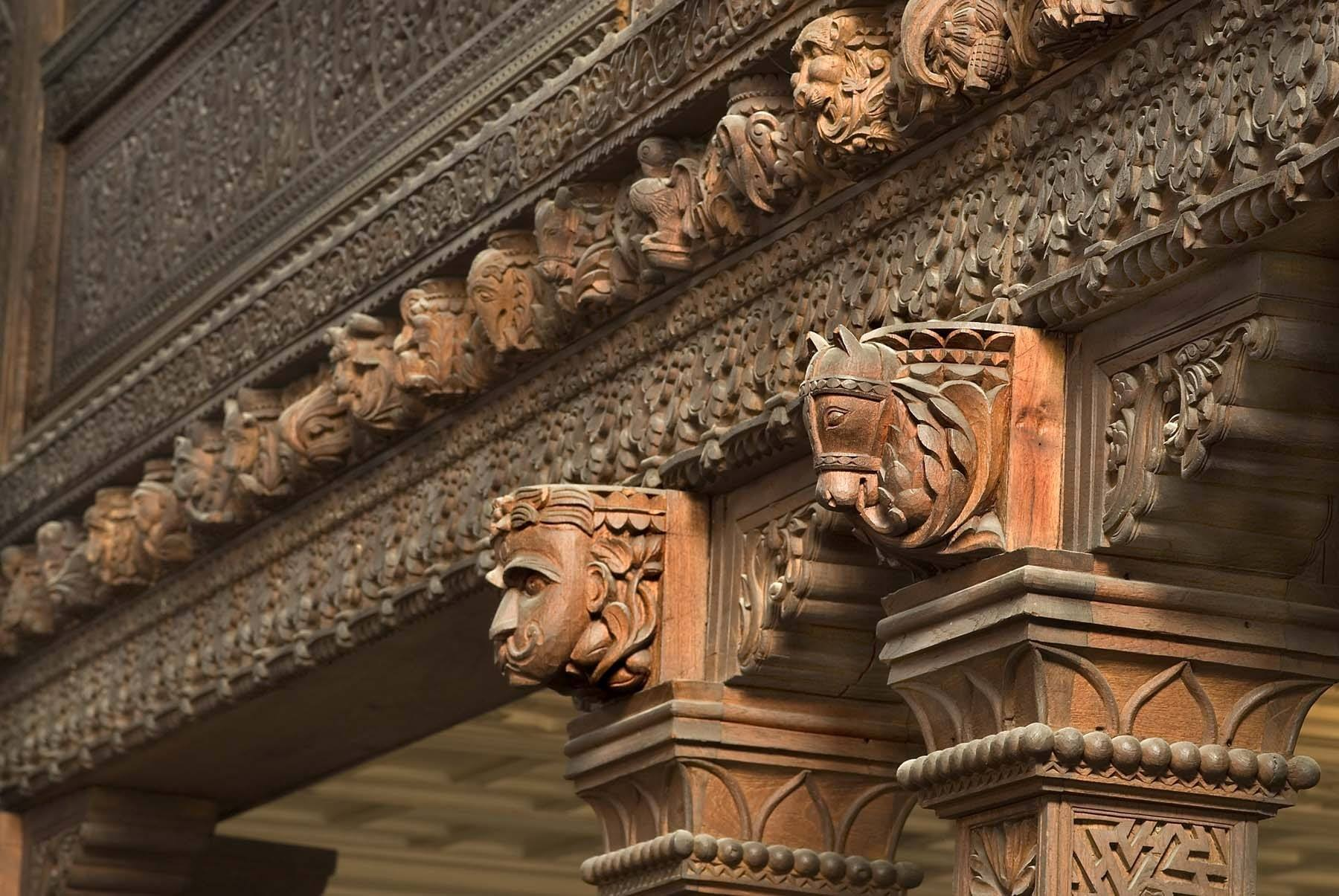
Durbar Hall carved wood detail

The Durbar Hall was constructed for the 1886 Colonial & Indian Exhibition in London. It was donated in 1919 as part of the Brassey Collection. The hall was the centrepiece of the Indian Court, a series of buildings designed and laid out like a traditional Indian palace. It was designed by Caspar Purdon Clarke and was built on-site by Mohammed Baksh and Mohammed Juma. Baksh and Juma were skilled woodcarvers brought over from the Punjab specially to do the wood carving required for the exhibition. During the exhibition, the hall was the Prince of Wales official reception pavilion. At the conclusion of the exhibition Thomas Brassey, 1st Earl Brassey bought parts of the Indian Court and had them remodelled and installed as an extension to his Park Lane house. It was removed from London by Thomas Brassey, 2nd Earl Brassey and gifted to Hastings in 1919. It was kept in storage until the 1930s, when it was re-constructed at the museum as it looked in the Brassey family's London home. Today the hall is lower floor of the hall is regularly used for many different types of events, including talks, theatre performances, preschool groups and weddings & civil partnerships. The upper hall is one of the museum's world cultures galleries.

== Collections ==
The collections of Hastings Museum & Art Gallery have been built up since 1890 when the Hastings and St Leonards Museum Association was founded. The collections are thought to number around 97,000 objects from around the world.

=== Community history ===
The museum's community history collections contain local and social history objects from Hastings and the surrounding areas. Together with the archaeology and decorative art collections they tell the story of the life and development of Hastings and the surrounding area from the 1500s to the present day.

The museum's local and social history collections contain objects relating to tourism, fishing and boat building, smuggling, wrecks, the Cinque Ports, the Bonfire Societies, local industries such as ironworking, gypsum and gunpowder manufacturing. There is also a significant number of commemorative and civic items, photographs, guide books and printed ephemera. The collection also includes artefacts relating to domestic life such as cooking, toys and games as well as a number related to local theatre and entertainment, writing, education, law and order, firefighting, transport and the First and Second World Wars.

The museum has significant collections relating to well-known local people including John Logie Baird, Robert Tressell and James Burton and Decimus Burton.

=== Archives ===
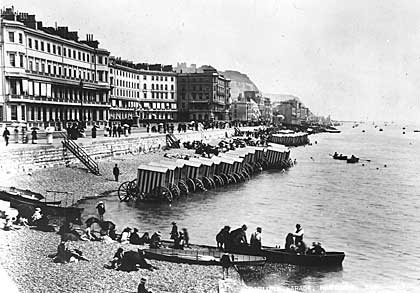
Victorian changing rooms on Hastings pier, c.1880

The museum has a large collection of papers relating to Hastings, the local area and significant individuals. These include John Logie Baird, Robert Tressell and Charles Dawson. There are also documents and books related the Cinque Ports, smuggling, fishing and local societies. The archive contains maps, photographs, documents and books.

The Burton Collection relating to late Georgian London developer James Burton and his architect son, Decimus, are held by the museum.

=== World cultures (ethnography) ===
Hastings Museum has a diverse group of world cultures collections (Ethnography). The world cultures collection includes objects from India, Burma, China, Japan, Indonesia, the Middle East, the Balkans, Scandinavia, Africa, Australia, New Zealand, South East Asia, South American and North America.

The largest part of this collection area was donated in 1919 by the Brassey family and come from the personal museum of Anna Brassey (1839-1887). Lady Brassey was an avid collector and photographer. She collected the majority of the material while travelling the world in the 1870s and 1880s. The largest number of objects come from the Pacific and Melanesia. Other collections in this area include Ambrose Jones Collection of stone carvings from Costa Rica and the Cullen Collection of artefacts from the Cook Islands and New Guinea.

The museum has a large collection of material related to Native North Americans, including objects collected by local writer and sculptor Clare Sheridan on her visit to America in 1937. The Blackmore Collection was bequeathed in 1982 and relates mainly to the Plains Indians. The museum is also home to the large collection of Colin Taylor, including a selection of high-quality items from the Subarctic region. The museum collection relating to Grey Owl, who was born and brought up in Hastings in the early years of the 20th century and adopted a Native American persona.

=== Archaeology ===
The museum's archaeological collection contains artefacts from Hastings and the surrounding area. There is also a small collection of artefacts from other parts of the world. The collection contains material from most British historical periods. There is a large number of flints from the Mesolithic to the Iron Age including those excavated by J Moore in Hastings Country Park. There are also good examples of Egyptian, Greek and Roman pottery from all periods. As well as a few pieces from pre-Columbian South America, New Zealand, Florida, Sweden and Denmark.

=== Numismatics ===
The numismatics collection is representative of coins from the Roman period through the 20th century. There are good examples from Saxon period from Sussex Mints, including Hastings. Tokens are well represented with over 700 local hop tokens and other trade tokens in the collection. The collection also includes commemorative and civic medallions and campaign medals.

=== Natural history ===
The museum's vertebrates collections is mainly focused on birds collected locally in the early 20th century. This includes examples of the Hastings Rarities. There are a few examples of larger mammal and fish also in the collection. The Entomology and Invertebrates collections are limited to butterflies, moths and other insects, shells, corals and sponges.

=== Geology ===
The geology collection consists of plant and animal fossils from the local area, including the collections of Teilhard de Chardin, Philip (James) Rufford and Samuel Beckles. Hastings has long been a classic site for Iguanodon remains. The collection has many examples of dinosaur fossils including footprints from the Cretaceous rocks at Fairlight and Galley Hill.

=== Fine art ===
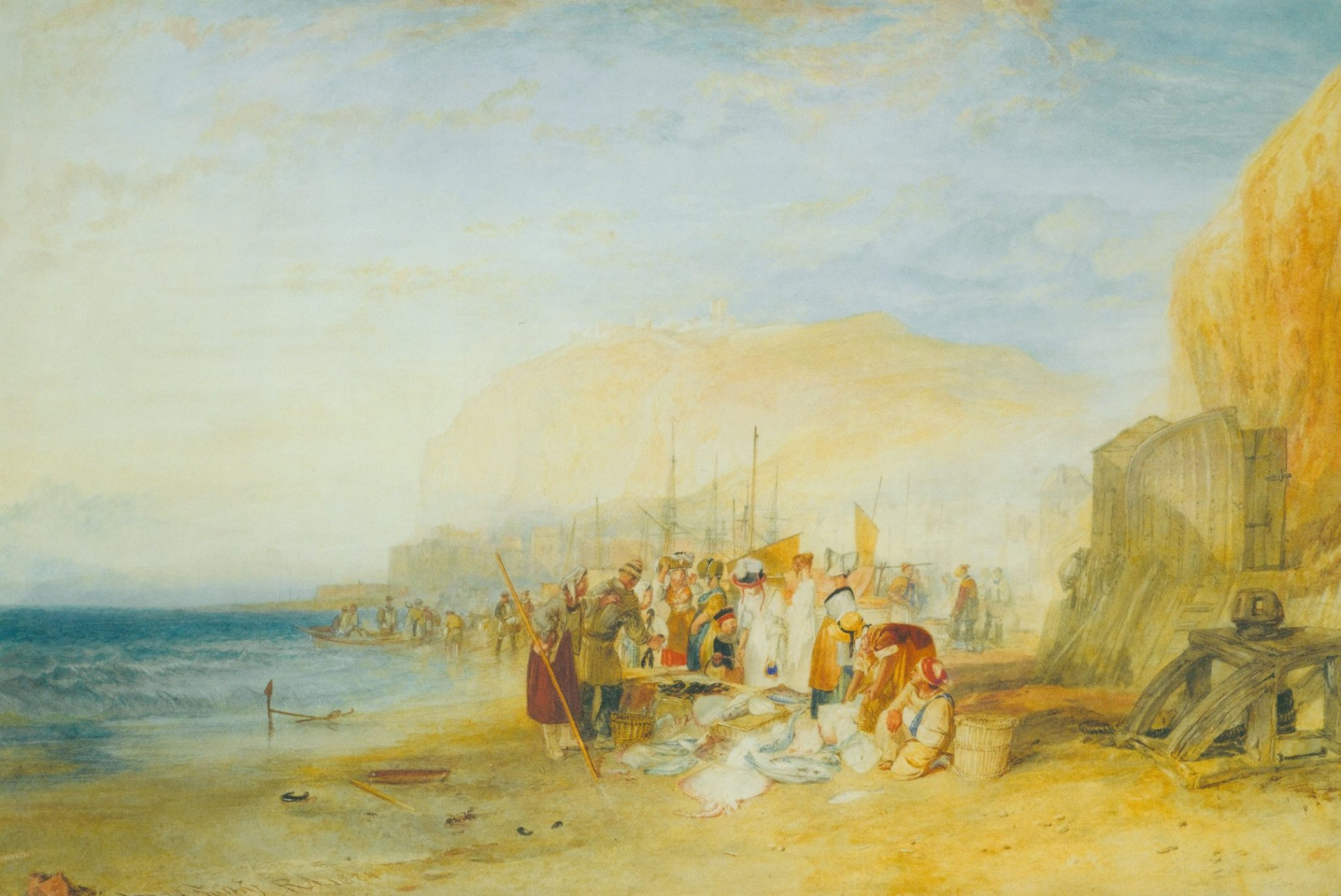
JMW Turner's watercolour, 'Fishmarket on the Sands, Early Morning 1824'

The museum's fine art collection consists largely of topographical paintings, drawings, prints and photographs of Hastings and the surrounding are. The large number of artworks in this collection date from the late 18th century to the present day. The museum also has a smaller collection of 20th century British art and examples from the main European Schools. There is also a small collection of sculpture from local artists as well. The museum's oil paintings and sculptures are available to view on the Art UK website.

=== Decorative art ===
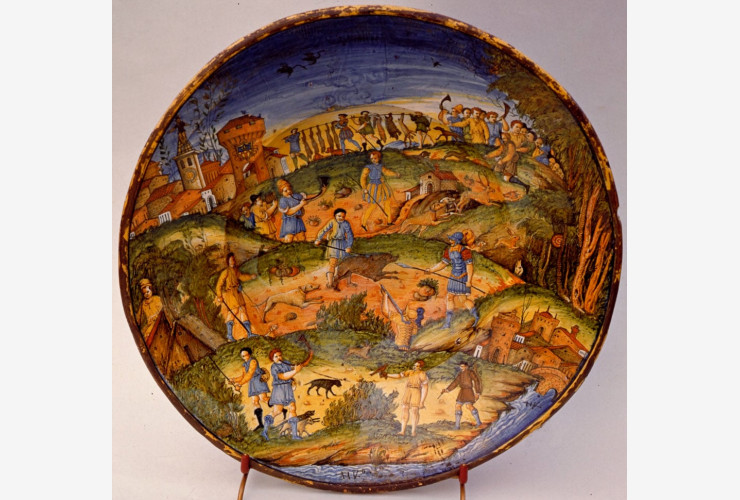
Maiolica Dish by Federigo of Modena, 1593–1594

The museum's decorative art collections comprise ceramics, furniture, silverware and jewellery. The largest and most significant is the ceramics collection. It includes a wide range of work from ancient civilisations through to contemporary studio pieces. It includes rare examples such as the large maiolica piece known as the Modena Dish. The collections include a comprehensive selection of Sussex pottery. The furniture collection is limited. It includes many fine examples of Sussex firebacks ranging in date from the 16th to the 18th century. There are also a number of clocks and cased verge watches from the 18th and 19th centuries.

=== Costume and textiles ===
The costume and textiles collection includes a range of local clothes such as smocks, waistcoats, women's and children's clothing, lace, whitework and samplers. There is also a good collection of English, French and German dolls.

== Covid-19 response ==
On 17 March 2020, the museum closed to the public due to the lockdown introduced by the UK Government to tackle the COVID-19 pandemic. Hastings Museum & Art Gallery launched Hastings Digital Museum in response. The digital museum aimed to "counter the increase in social isolation and loneliness that COVID-19 is likely to cause."

The digital museum ran across the museum's social media accounts on Twitter, Facebook and Instagram using #HastingsDigitalMuseum. Digital content was produced by the museum team and also by freelancers. Funding to do this came from the museum's core budget, funding from a local charity, Chalk Cliff Trust, and Arts Council England's Museums and Schools Programme.

The digital museum produced a range of activities including immersive game experiences, community art projects and creative workshops. Each of the activities they produced focused on involving people and encouraged participation. Some of the activities now feature on other websites; Hastings Digital Quilt is on Art UK and the LGBTQ+ inspired zine activity is on The British Museum site.

The museum also launched a contemporary collecting project to record peoples' everyday experiences of lockdown. Volunteers were asked "to write as much or as little as they want to each day, but to make an entry every day" sharing their daily activities and feelings. Over 120 people volunteered to record their experiences. They also invited local black and ethnic minority creatives to respond to the murder of George Floyd in the US and the Black Lives Matter movement. The museum supported four creatives to respond and shared their work through the museum's social media accounts.
