= Grade II* listed buildings in Hastings =

There are over 20,000 Grade II* listed buildings in England. This page is a list of these buildings in the district of Hastings in East Sussex.

== List ==
Name	Location	Type	Completed (Note: The date given is the date used by Historic England as significant for the initial building or that of an important part in the structure's description.)	Date designated	Grid ref. (Note: Sometimes known as OSGB36, the grid reference is based on the British national grid reference system used by the Ordnance Survey.) Geo-coordinates	Entry number (Note: The "List Entry Number" is a unique number assigned to each listed building and scheduled monument by Historic England.)	Image
Wellington Square Baptist Church	Hastings	Church	1838	19 January 1951	TQ8181709457; 50°51′22″N 0°34′55″E	1286663	Wellington Square Baptist Church More images
Chapel to the Former Convent of the Holy Child Jesus	St Leonards-on-Sea, Hastings	Chapel	c. 1850	14 September 1976	TQ8076109226; 50°51′15″N 0°34′00″E	1043478	Chapel to the Former Convent of the Holy Child Jesus
Christ Church	Blacklands, Hastings	Church	1878-1881	14 September 1976	TQ8148610651; 50°52′01″N 0°34′40″E	1286964	Christ Church More images
Christ Church and St Mary Magdalen	St Leonards-on-Sea, Hastings	Church	1873 to 1875	14 September 1976	TQ8024309148; 50°51′14″N 0°33′34″E	1286965	Christ Church and St Mary Magdalen More images
Church of All Saints	Hastings	Church	Early 15th century	19 January 1951	TQ8282609860; 50°51′34″N 0°35′47″E	1353127	Church of All Saints More images
Church of All Souls	Clive Vale, Hastings	Church	1890	14 September 1976	TQ8353710768; 50°52′02″N 0°36′25″E	1293681	Church of All Souls More images
Church of St Clement	Hastings	Church	19th century	19 January 1951	TQ8244409626; 50°51′27″N 0°35′27″E	1286732	Church of St Clement More images
Church of St John the Evangelist	St Leonards-on-Sea, Hastings	Church	1881	14 September 1976	TQ7978509369; 50°51′21″N 0°33′11″E	1043400	Church of St John the Evangelist More images
Church of St Mary in the Castle	Hastings	Church	1825-1828	19 January 1951	TQ8201309415; 50°51′20″N 0°35′05″E	1353209	Church of St Mary in the Castle More images
Church of St Matthew	Silverhill, Hastings	Church	1884	14 September 1976	TQ7992110459; 50°51′56″N 0°33′20″E	1192138	Church of St Matthew More images
Church of St Peter	Bohemia, Hastings	Church	1885	14 September 1976	TQ8035809934; 50°51′39″N 0°33′41″E	1353235	Church of St Peter More images
Church of the Holy Trinity	Hastings	Church	1851-9	14 September 1976	TQ8146109340; 50°51′18″N 0°34′36″E	1043423	Church of the Holy Trinity More images
Crown House	St Leonards-on-Sea, Hastings	Detached House	1828	19 January 1951	TQ7976908817; 50°51′03″N 0°33′09″E	1043436	Crown House More images
Net and Tackle Stores on Beach including Groups L to W (consecutive)	Hastings	Net House	Probably 16th century	14 September 1976	TQ8267109488; 50°51′22″N 0°35′38″E	1192092	Net and Tackle Stores on Beach including Groups L to W (consecutive) More images
Old Hastings House	Hastings	Country House	Early-Mid 18th century	19 January 1951	TQ8274609970; 50°51′37″N 0°35′43″E	1043462	Old Hastings House More images
Pelham Arcade	Hastings	Shopping Arcade	1823-1825	3 May 1988	TQ8201609386; 50°51′19″N 0°35′05″E	1043389	Pelham Arcade
Statue of Queen Anne South East of Holmhurst St Mary's School	Baldslow, Hastings	Statue	1711-12	14 September 1976	TQ8039912891; 50°53′14″N 0°33′48″E	1192060	Upload Photo
The Clock House	St Leonards-on-Sea, Hastings	House	1828	19 January 1951	TQ7992409053; 50°51′11″N 0°33′17″E	1043443	The Clock House
The Cupola, Belmont Road	Belmont, Hastings	Villa	c. 1835	14 September 1976	TQ8302910213; 50°51′45″N 0°35′58″E	1353124	The Cupola, Belmont Road
The Stables Theatre	Hastings	House	Possibly late 17th century	19 January 1951	TQ8271709894; 50°51′35″N 0°35′41″E	1353194	The Stables Theatre More images
Windycroft	High Wickham, Hastings	House	Pre 1879	14 September 1976	TQ8299810001; 50°51′38″N 0°35′56″E	1043472	Windycroft More images
No. 7 and 8 Pelham Place	Hastings	House	New	19 January 1951	TQ8207509386; 50°51′19″N 0°35′08″E	1191986	No. 7 and 8 Pelham Place
No. 1-14, 14a and 15 Pelham Crescent and 9 Pelham Place	Hastings	House	1824-8	19 January 1951	TQ8204009398; 50°51′20″N 0°35′06″E	1191926	No. 1-14, 14a and 15 Pelham Crescent and 9 Pelham Place
