= St Matthew's Church, Silverhill =

St Matthew's Church
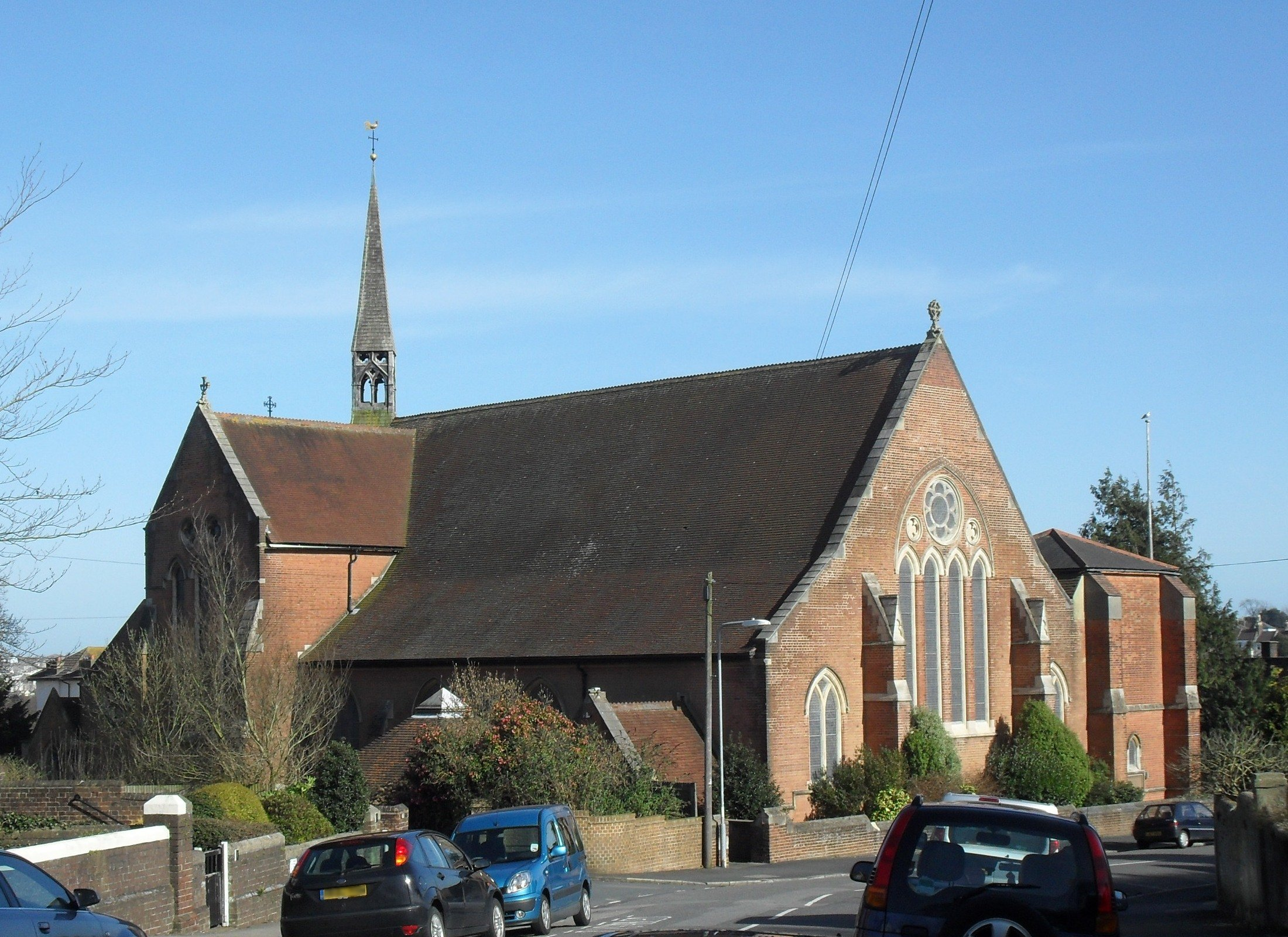
- The church from the northwest, showing the tower stump (right)
- St Matthew's Church
- 50.8656°N 0.5556°E
- OS grid reference: TQ 79921 10459
- Location: St Matthew's Road, Silverhill, Hastings, East Sussex TN37 6PD
- Country: England
- Denomination: Church of England
- Churchmanship: Conservative Evangelical
- Website: www.stmatts.co.uk

History
- Status: Parish church
- Founded: 21 September 1860
- Founder(s): Rev. John Cumberlege; Sarah Waldegrave, Countess Waldegrave
- Dedication: Matthew

Architecture
- Functional status: Active
- Heritage designation: Grade II*
- Designated: 14 September 1976
- Architect(s): George Voysey (first church); John Loughborough Pearson (present building)
- Style: Early English Gothic
- Completed: 1861 (first church); 1884 (present building)

Administration
- Province: Canterbury
- Diocese: Chichester
- Archdeaconry: Archdeaconry of Hastings
- Deanery: Rural Deanery of Hastings
- Parish: St Matthew, Silverhill

St Matthew's Church is an Anglican church in the Silverhill suburb of Hastings, a town and borough in the English county of East Sussex. The present building, a large brick structure of 1884 by ecclesiastical architect John Loughborough Pearson, replaced a much smaller church founded in 1860 when Silverhill began to grow from an agricultural area with scattered cottages into a suburb of the increasingly fashionable seaside resort of Hastings. Although a planned tower was never built, the "imposing" church dominates its steeply sloping site; and although its architect—a leading Gothic Revivalist—considered it one of his lesser works, it has been described as "outstanding" and "architecturally inventive". English Heritage has listed the building at Grade II* for its architectural and historical importance.

== History ==
As early as 928, when it was first described in writing, Hastings was an important town. Its position on the English Channel coast at the bottom of a narrow valley gave it strategic advantages, and it was a successful fishing port and the chief Cinque Port. The seven medieval churches it supported by the late 13th century had declined to two—All Saints and St Clement's—by 1801, but by then the town was about to enter its most rapid period of growth, which saw it expand well beyond the confines of the Bourne valley. Daytrippers, holidaymakers and permanent residents were attracted by better transport links (especially from London) and the prestige of royal patronage (conferred by visits by various members of the British royal family), and London builder and speculator James Burton conceived and laid out a whole new town, St Leonards-on-Sea, immediately west of Hastings in the 1820s to create an upper-class rival to the old resort.

Silverhill was one of the first suburbs to develop during the 19th-century growth period. Originally part of the ancient manor of Stone, the land belonging to the farm from which the area takes its name was gradually sold off for development from the 1850s, when its owner faced financial difficulties. Development had first been stimulated by the building of two turnpikes in quick succession—one to Sedlescombe in 1837 and another to Battle the following year—which significantly shortened the distance from St Leonards-on-Sea and Hastings respectively to London. Housing, inns, a hotel, a brickworks and a windmill were built around the junction of these two routes.

The first Christian presence in Silverhill was the Silver Hill Independent Chapel, which started in a rented room in 1853, moved to a proper chapel in 1857 and joined the English Presbyterian Church (as Silverhill Presbyterian Church) in 1862. The nearest Anglican churches, at Hollington (Church in the Wood) and St Leonards-on-Sea (St Leonard's Church), were distant, and their vicars antagonised local residents by criticising and threatening them for attending the independent chapel's meetings instead. The Anglican community realised the need to establish a church of their own in Silverhill. Rev. John Cumberlege (or Cumberledge), a retired vicar, lived in a large villa with substantial gardens in the centre of Silverhill. He donated some of his land to allow a church to be built, and also paid for its construction. The first St Matthew's Church was founded on that saint's feast day, 21 September 1860; local philanthropist and church benefactor Sarah Waldegrave, Countess Waldegrave (widow of a former Mayor of Hastings) laid the first stone. George Voysey, a local architect, designed the stone, brick and stucco building, which opened for worship on 16 May 1861.

St Matthew's was in the parish of St Leonard's Church at first, but in 1870 an Act of Parliament separated it from its mother church and gave it a parish of its own. At the same time, Rev. Cumberlege's widow, who held the advowson of the church, donated £3,000 (£308,700 in 2025) to offset the costs of construction. Some of this was used to add a tower and porch to the building in 1874. A school had been founded on the south side of the church as well; in 1878 this moved to a larger site on nearby Strood Road.

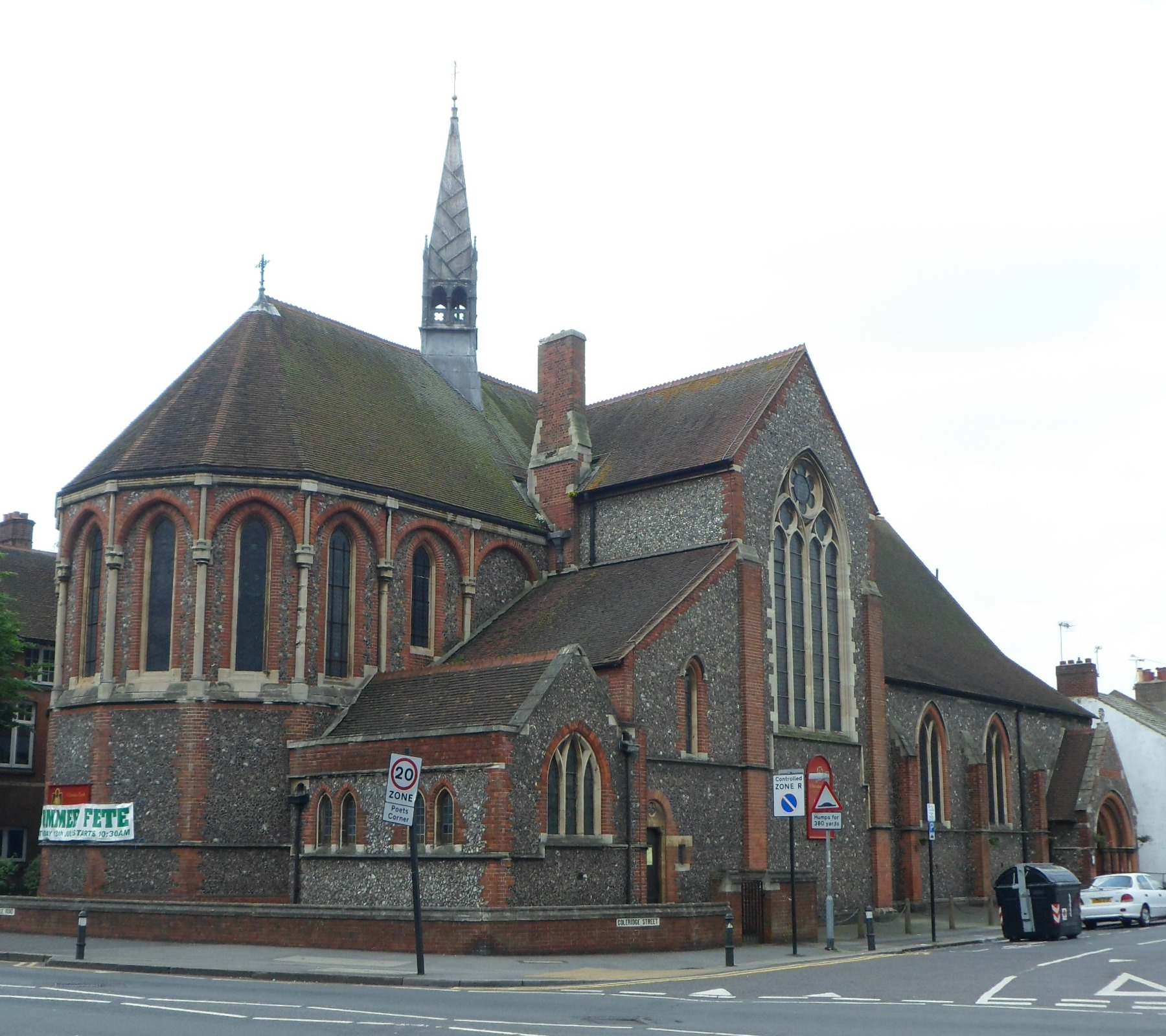
St Barnabas Church in Hove, also in East Sussex, was built to a very similar Pearson design in 1882–83.

As Silverhill's growth continued, a larger church building was soon needed. (The population of 73 in 1811 had grown to 183 in 1861; by 1881 there were 1,261 residents.) In 1885, land behind the original church was bought, and the rector Rev. Francis Newton commissioned John Loughborough Pearson—a prominent Gothic Revival architect responsible for Truro Cathedral, Brisbane Cathedral and several churches in Sussex and other parts of Britain—to design a new St Matthew's Church on the steeply sloping site. Rev. Newton had seen Pearson's recently completed church at Hove, St Barnabas, and approved of it; the two churches share many stylistic similarities. The new church, built by a Mr Shillitoe, cost £11,201 (£1,244,400 in 2025) exclusive of the planned tower and spire. Although the stump of a tower was added in 1896 by a different builder (C.W. Pelling Hurrell) but matching Pearson's design, money soon ran out and no more was built. A tiny wooden flèche was added to the roof instead. The stump of the tower was subsequently converted into a porch.

The original church building, fronting the London Road, was converted into the parish hall after the new church opened; it survived until 1959, when a new hall was built on the same site. Meanwhile, the new church was fitted out with a high-quality organ by the Henry Willis & Sons firm, bought for £1,064 in 1890 (£118,200 in 2025), and a stone reredos by Aston Webb, which was acquired in 1900 and dedicated the following year. Some stained glass memorial windows were added in 1892, complementing others which had been removed from the 1860 church and reinstalled in the new building.

St Matthew's Church extended its reach further northwards in 1912 by founding a mission chapel on Duke Road (at 50.8705°N 0.5573°E). The first brick was laid on 27 June 1912 and the building opened soon afterwards as St Matthew's Mission Hall. It later closed and was used as an artificial flower factory, but in 1994 it became a place of worship again when the St Leonards Assemblies of God Pentecostal Church—founded nine years earlier as a house church—bought it. The Pentecostal congregation renamed the building "His Place Community Church Centre". They used it until 2013, when they moved into the former Robertson Street United Reformed Church in Hastings town centre; it was later taken over by Calvary Chapel Hastings, a non-denominational Evangelical group.

== Architecture ==
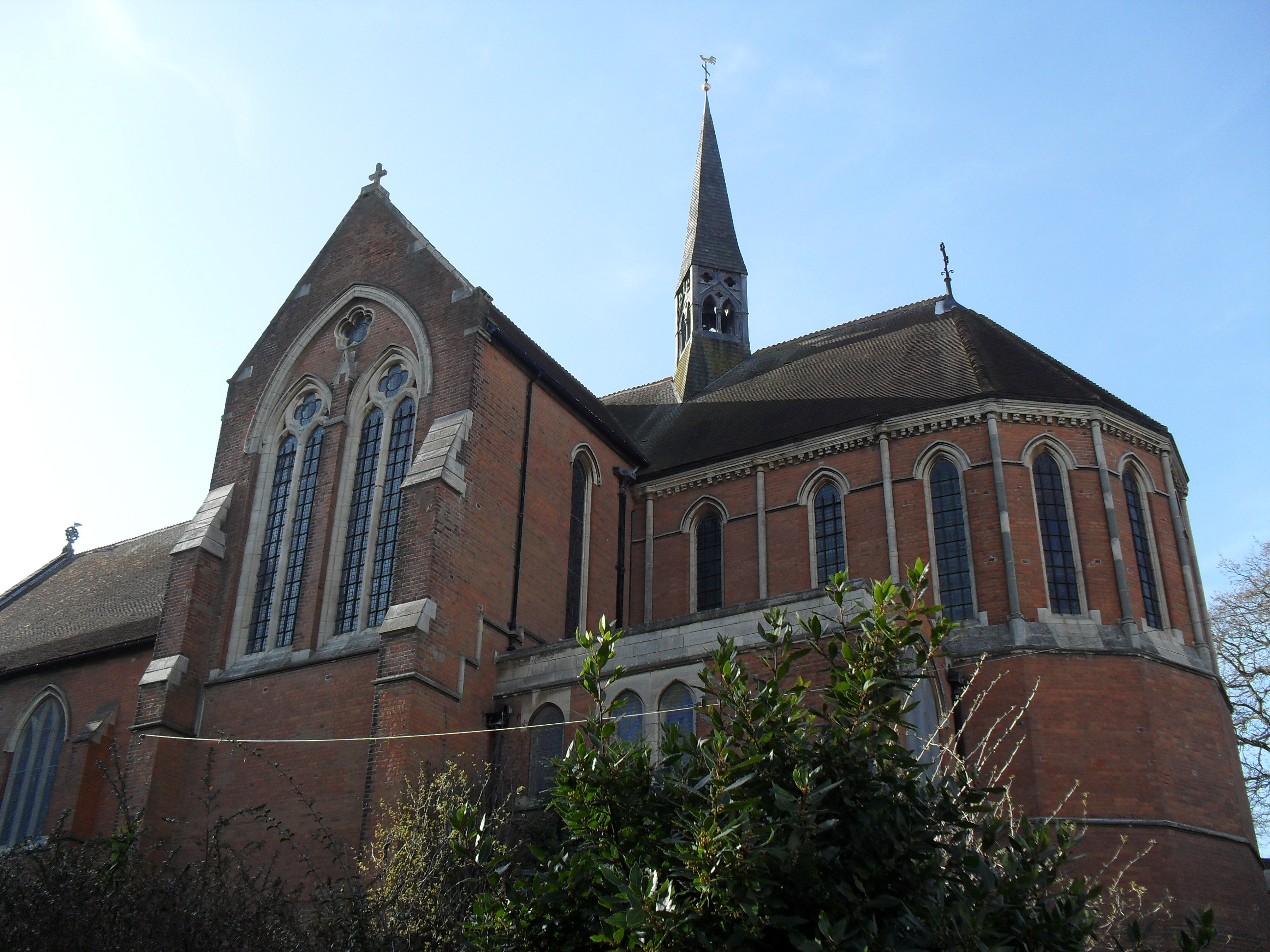
The east end of St Matthew's Church has a polygonal apse with lancet windows separated by stone shafts. The south transept has paired lancets and a sexfoil window.

St Matthew's Church is a large Early English Gothic revival building with elements of the later Decorated Gothic style. John Loughborough Pearson regarded it as one of his cheaper churches in terms of its design: he reused structural and decorative elements from earlier commissions (in particular St Barnabas Church in Hove, completed in 1883), and restricted himself to using red brick and small quantities of stone. Nevertheless, the design is successful: it has been described as "well-proportioned and well-planned", "serious", and "outstanding ... imposing ... [and] architecturally inventive". The steeply sloping site, which elevates the east end well above the level of the London Road, is considered to enhance the effect of the design.

The church has a nave with aisles on both sides, a chancel with a polygonal apse at the east end, transepts, a side chapel and a balancing organ chamber leading off the chancel, a porch on both sides at the west end (one incorporated into the stump of the tower, the other with an adjoining meeting room), a vestry and a small flèche of wood with leaded shingles. There is a clerestorey between the aisles and the roof: instead of windows, it has blank quatrefoil-shaped panels. Red brick laid in the English bond pattern is the predominant material on the outside, although there are some stone dressings as well; inside, both red and yellow brick is used to create multicoloured decorative bands. The yellow brick was made at Sittingbourne in Kent.

All windows are lancets. The three in the north transept are very tall and have two quatrefoils above, while in the south transept two narrower windows with intricate tracery are separated by a thick mullion. There is also a quatrefoil and a sexfoil (six-lobed round window) in this wall. The aisles have three-light lancet windows, and there is a large lancet topped by a quatrefoil in the west wall of the nave. The Heaton, Butler and Bayne glass firm designed the stained glass in this window in 1892. Each lancet in the apse is separated by a thin stone shaft inside and out. This feature was copied from St Barnabas Church, Hove.

Inside, the lack of a chancel arch creates a large single space, enhanced by the nave and aisles having the same roofline. The roof is timber-framed with king posts, tie-beams and double trusses (in the absence of a chancel arch, these form the only demarcation between the nave and chancel). There is also a smaller timber-framed roof in the separate south chapel.

Fittings include Aston Webb's stone reredos—in a triptych form with carved figures and tracery on each panel—an octagonal carved stone font dating from 1888, the high-quality Willis organ of 1890 (housed in its own chamber off the chancel), and a stone pulpit donated by Rev. Cumberlege's widow and designed by Pearson himself.

== The church today ==
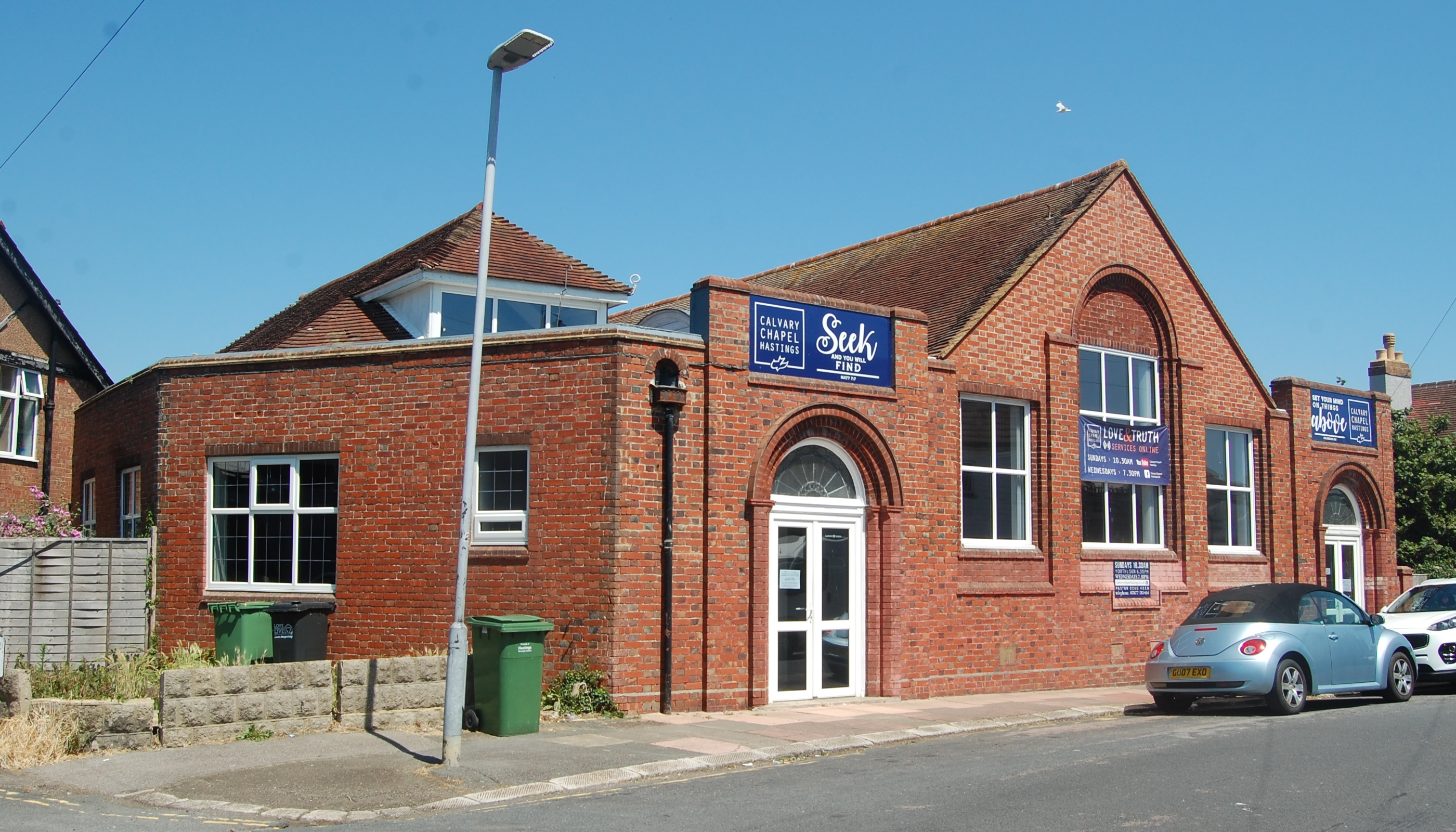
The 1912 mission chapel built by St Matthew's Church is now used by Calvary Church Hastings.

St Matthew's Church was listed at Grade B by English Heritage on 14 September 1976, and was later regraded at the equivalent Grade II*. (Grade B was part of an old superseded scale of ratings used only for Anglican churches.) As a Grade II*-listed building, it is considered "particularly important ... [and] of more than special interest". In February 2001, it was one of 13 Grade II* listed buildings, and 535 listed buildings of all grades, in the borough of Hastings.

The parish covers the same territory as it did when it was created in 1870: the boundaries are St Helen's Road (the A2101) in the east; Briers Road, Perth Road and Stonehouse Drive to the north; the postwar Ponswood industrial estate to the west; and the Bohemia suburb to the south (beyond Springfield Road, Tower Road and Newgate Road).

== See also ==
- Grade II* listed buildings in Hastings
- List of places of worship in Hastings
- List of new ecclesiastical buildings by J. L. Pearson

== Bibliography ==
- Brooks, Ken (2004). Around Hastings Then and Now. St Leonards-on-Sea: Ken Brooks. ISBN 0-9540513-2-7.
- Buckle, Alan G. (2003). An Independent Chapel: The Story of St Luke's in Silverhill 1853–2003. Hastings: Hastings Local History Group.
- Elleray, D. Robert (1979). Hastings: a Pictorial History. Chichester: Phillimore & Co. ISBN 0-85033-324-5.
- Elleray, D. Robert (1981). The Victorian Churches of Sussex. Chichester: Phillimore & Co. Ltd. ISBN 0-85033-378-4.
- Elleray, D. Robert (2004). Sussex Places of Worship. Worthing: Optimus Books. ISBN 0-9533132-7-1.
- Nairn, Ian; Pevsner, Nikolaus (1965). The Buildings of England: Sussex. Harmondsworth: Penguin Books. ISBN 0-14-071028-0.
- Salzman, L. F., ed. (1973) [1937]. A History of Sussex. The Victoria Histories of the Counties of England. Vol. 9. Folkestone: Dawsons of Pall Mall (originally Oxford: Oxford University Press). ISBN 0-7129-0590-1.
