= Crown House =

Crown House may refer to:

- Crown House, St Leonards-on-Sea, a building in East Sussex
- Crown House, Kidderminster, a building featured in Demolition
- Crown House, a residence Hall at the University of Chicago
- Crown House, a residence hall at University of Reading
- Crown House, a 1988 book by Peter Ling
- Crown House Engineering, acquired by Laing O'Rourke construction company in 2004
- Crown House Publishing, a publishing company based in Wales
- Crown House, Chatham, a mid-20th-century office block on The Brook in Chatham, Kent
