= Pelham Crescent =

Pelham Crescent may refer to:

- Pelham Crescent, London
- Pelham Crescent, Hastings, home to the Grade II* listed Pelham Arcade
