= St Luke's United Reformed Church, Silverhill, Hastings =

St Luke's Church
- St Luke's United Reformed Church
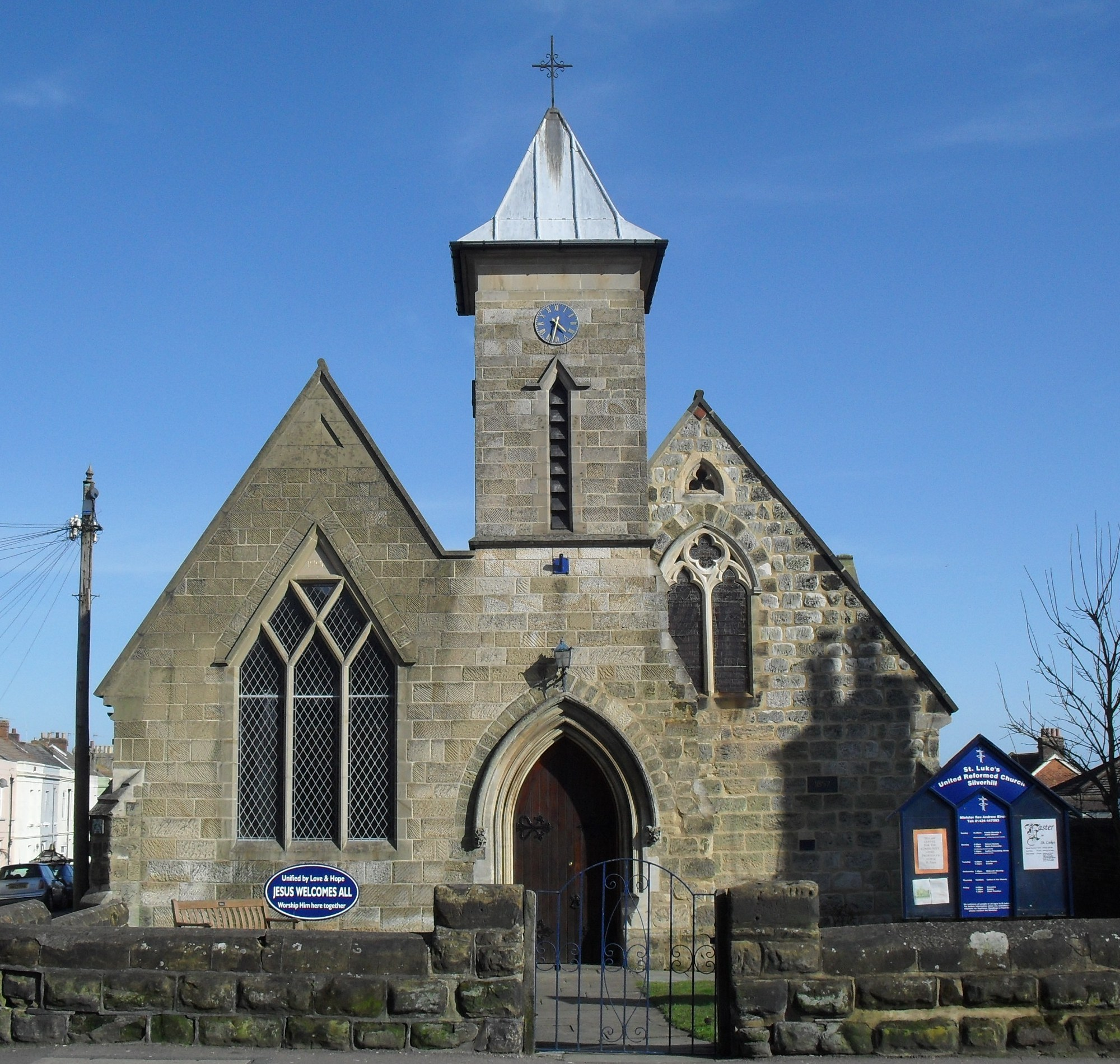
- The church from the west
- St Luke's Church
- 50.8695°N 0.5572°E
- OS grid reference: TQ 80028 10892
- Location: Sedlescombe Road North, Silverhill, Hastings, East Sussex TN37 6QT
- Country: England
- Denomination: United Reformed Church
- Previous denomination: Presbyterian

History
- Former name(s): Silverhill Independent Chapel; Silverhill Presbyterian Church
- Status: Church
- Founded: 1853
- Founder: William Boyd
- Dedication: Saint Luke
- Dedicated: 1920s
- Events: 1853: Congregation established at Providence Villa; 1857: Silverhill Independent Chapel opened 1862: Chapel extended 1920s: Dedicated to St Luke; 1972: Became part of United Reformed Church; 1987: Building damaged in the Great Storm

Architecture
- Functional status: Active
- Architect: Henry Carpenter
- Style: Early English Gothic
- Groundbreaking: 1857
- Completed: 12 July 1857
- Construction cost: £370 (£36,200 in 2025)

St Luke's Church is a United Reformed church in the Silverhill suburb of Hastings, a town and borough in East Sussex, England. The congregation was originally independent (not linked to any Christian denomination) before taking up Presbyterianism, and worshipped in a private house from its founding in 1853 until a permanent church was provided in 1857; this was one of the oldest Presbyterian places of worship in southeast England. The growth of the community has resulted in several extensions since then, and severe damage caused by the Great Storm of 1987 was quickly repaired—except for the loss of the building's distinctive spire. The church, along with most other Presbyterian congregations, joined the United Reformed Church when that denomination was formed in 1972. It is one of four United Reformed Churches in the borough of Hastings.

== History ==
The manor of Stone was one of several medieval land divisions in the area now covered by Hastings. Its land covered a large, thinly populated area northwest of the ancient fishing port of Hastings. Ecclesiastically, it was a prebend linked to the collegiate church of St Mary-in-the-Castle in the grounds of Hastings Castle.

Much of the land in the manor was part of a single farm. Originally named Cildetona (farm of the heirs or children), the name became modernised to Childerton and later Chillington Farm, before being recorded as High Ridge Farm in 1714 (around the time it was bought by the Town Clerk of Hastings), Salver Hill Farm in 1785 and Silver Hill Farm before 1815. Around this time, Hastings and the high-class neighbouring planned development of St Leonards-on-Sea had begun to develop rapidly as fashionable seaside resorts, helped by better transport connections and royal patronage. New turnpikes were built northwards to Sedlescombe in 1837 and Battle the following year to reduce the road distance from Hastings and St Leonards-on-Sea to London; the roads met at Silver Hill Farm, and the area began to develop as a suburb, with a windmill, hotel (the Tivoli) and tearooms. By 1839, a combined pottery and brickworks building and cottages for its workers also existed.

Despite this development, by 1853 Silver Hill Farm was still a working farm. Francis Smith owned it and a local shopkeeper, George Street, was its tenant. Street employed a tutor, William Boyd, for his son. Boyd was a member of the United Presbyterian Church of Scotland and had recently studied theology. Realising there were no churches (either Anglican or Nonconformist) nearby—the closest were the ancient Church in the Wood at Hollington and the new St Leonard's Church, the centrepiece of James Burton's St Leonards-on-Sea development—he decided to found one of his own. The resident of Providence Villa, a new house near the Tivoli Hotel, allowed Boyd to use one of his rooms for preaching. Boyd's mission was so successful that by 1855, the congregation was too large for the house and the meetings had to move to a public building (believed to be the hotel itself) nearby.

The meetings were "independent" (not linked to any denomination), and the congregation attended them instead of going to the Anglican churches at Hollington or St Leonards-on-Sea. In 1856, the vicars of both churches visited the meeting and spoke individually to members of the congregation, making clear their opposition:

In harsh language he [the vicar of St Leonard's Church] rebuked them for attending the meeting, and threatened to deprive them of the charities of the [Anglican] church if they persisted in going ... the vicar of Hollington was appraised of the meetings last week by his brother of St Leonard's, and called upon to exercise his authority in preventing some of his flock from attending. [...] I will not repeat the offensive epithets applied, nor describe the manifestations, which the cottagers in this part of St Leonards [i.e. Silverhill] heard or saw.

— Anonymous writer, credited as "Observer", to The Hastings & St Leonards News, 1856

Despite this opposition, Boyd decided to build a permanent chapel. By this time, his studies were nearly complete and he was about to be ordained into the Presbyterian Church, but the chapel was still intended to be primarily independent and non-denominational. A committee of eight trustees was drawn from the members of various local Anglican and Nonconformist churches who were supportive of the cause, and fundraising began. The landowner Francis Smith—who by this time was in financial difficulty and was about to sell Silver Hill Farm for housing and other development—sold some land for £50 (equivalent to £4,900 in 2025), and the first chapel was designed by local architect Henry Carpenter and built for £370 (equivalent to £36,200 in 2025) in a few months in 1857. (He later designed Christ Church in the Blacklands suburb of Hastings for the Anglican community there.) Boyd held the first service at Silver Hill Independent Chapel on 12 July 1857. A Sunday school was inaugurated the following week with 30 children.

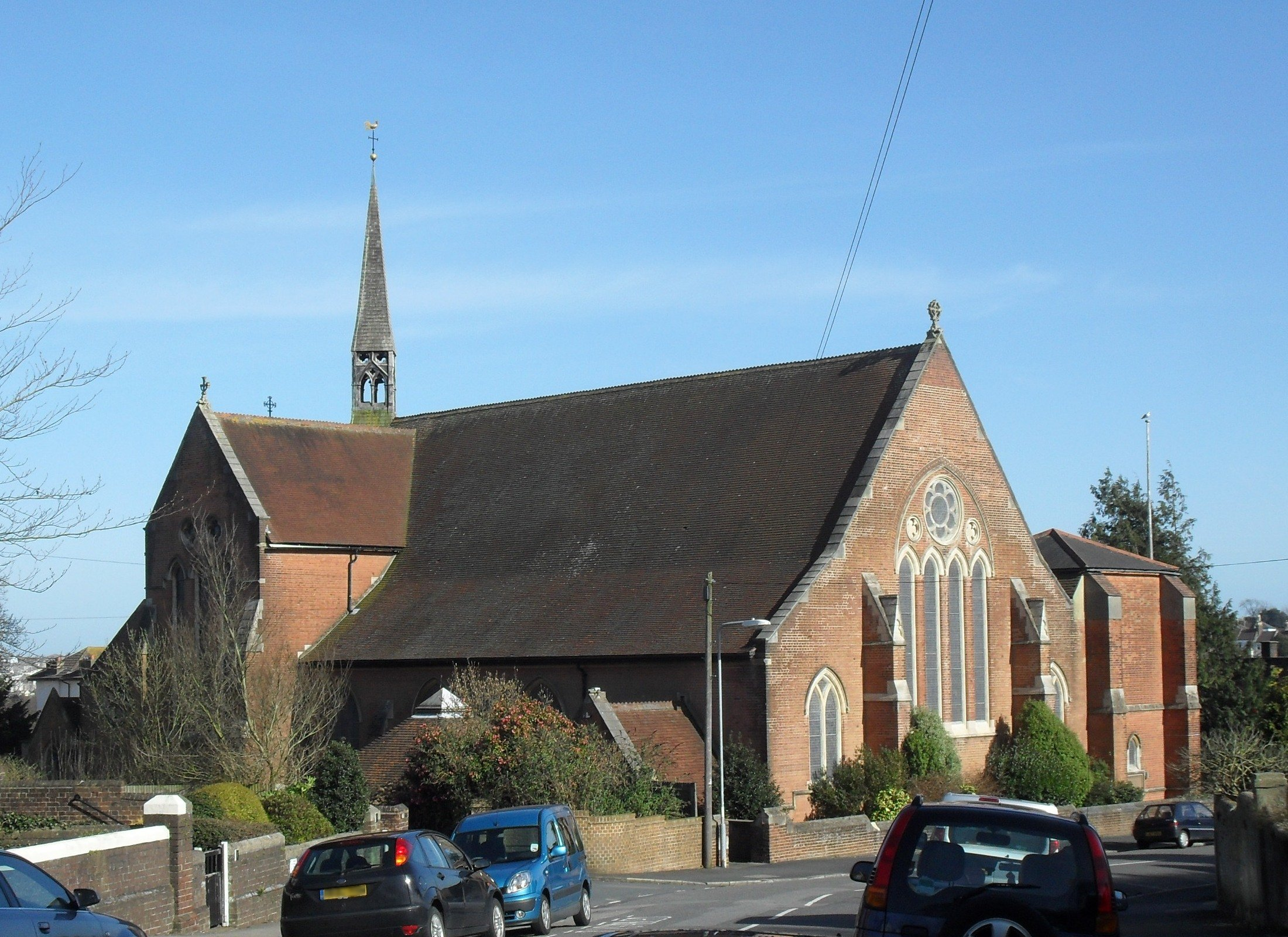
St Matthew's Church, the Anglican church in Silverhill, initially attracted some worshippers away from William Boyd's chapel when it opened in May 1861.

From 1860, the pace of development increased in Silverhill (by now established as the name of the suburb). New terraced houses, villas and inns were built, and more of the farmland was sold. The Anglican community also established their own church in the suburb: St Matthew's Church was founded on 21 September 1860 by Sarah Waldegrave, Countess Waldegrave. It opened for worship in May 1861. By 1862, William Boyd and his immediate successor had left and a new minister, Walter Roberts, was in place. Under his ministry, the church joined the English Presbyterian Church, and the building was extended at a cost of £400 (£42,100 in 2025)—despite attendances falling temporarily as some worshippers returned to the Anglican Communion and attended St Matthew's Church instead. By 1864, the fortunes of Silverhill Presbyterian Church (as it was now known) had improved, and the enlarged building was regularly full. More work was carried out in 1865, when a tower and a distinctive tall spire were added at the west end. At the same time, the nave was widened and a vestry was built. £544.9s.6d (£59,100 in 2025) was spent in total. New fittings added in the 1860s and 1870s included a harmonium, wooden rostrum, panelled lobby built by a local resident, a set of pews and a proper heating system. Meanwhile, the Sunday school was given its own separate premises when a schoolroom was built adjoining the chapel in 1878. George Clement, the tenant of Silver Hill Farm when the chapel was founded in 1853, donated some land and a third of the £296 (£30,500 in 2025) cost of construction. The chapel was closed during these renovations, but reopened on 26 May 1878.

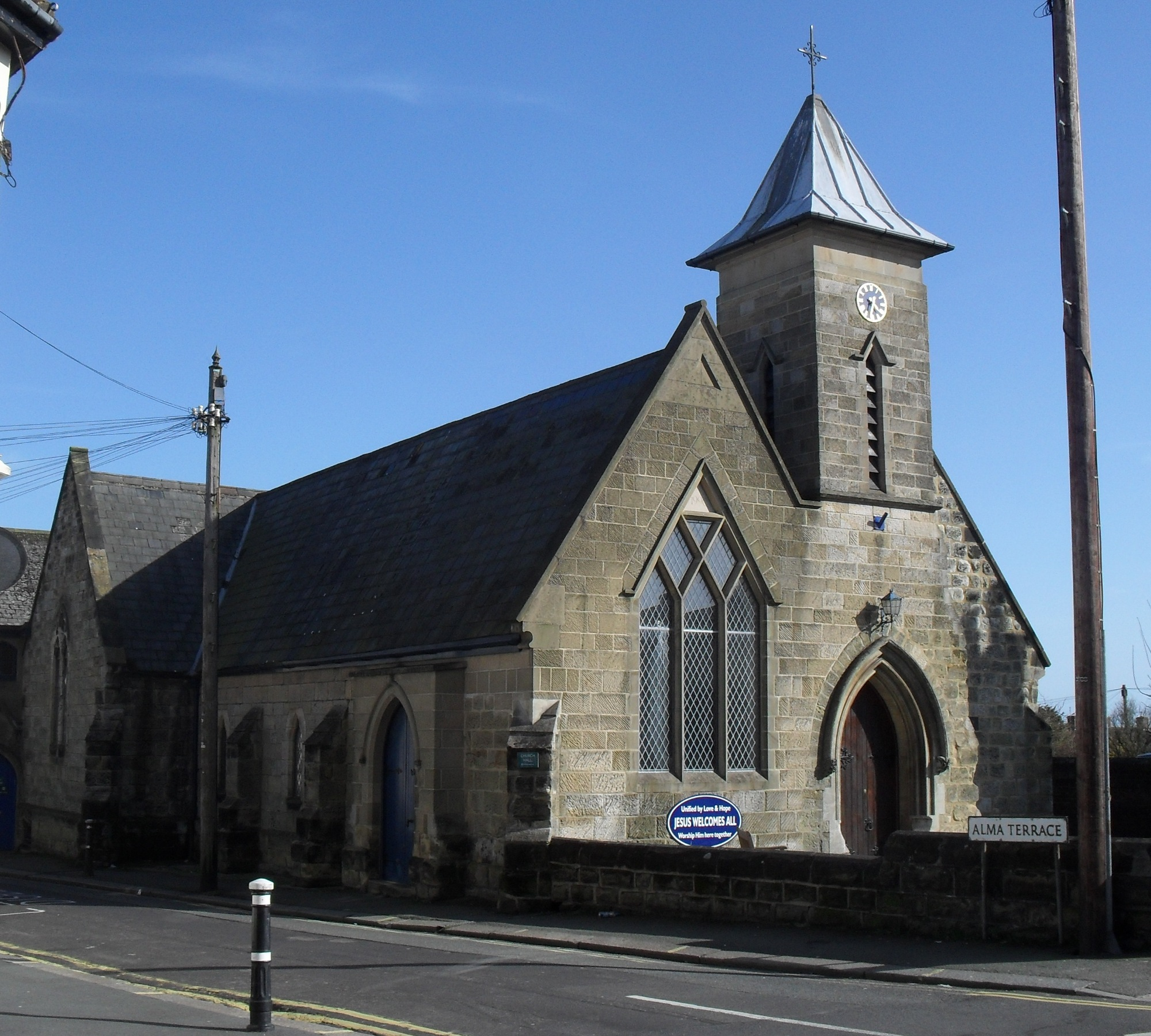
The church hall of 1909 is behind the main body of the church.

The congregation continued to grow, and in the chapel's golden jubilee year of 1907 a "Jubilee Fund" was begun to raise money for further extensions. £700 (£72,000 in 2025) had been pledged by 1909. The former schoolroom was demolished and replaced with a larger hall with subsidiary rooms, a chancel was added to the chapel, the sanctuary was refitted with new wooden fixtures and a stone font, and the building received electric light for the first time. Work started on 5 August 1909 and was completed about 10 weeks later, when the hall and chancel were dedicated.

In the 1920s, Silverhill Presbyterian Church was renamed St Luke's Presbyterian Church after a vote was taken on which of three saints—Luke, Stephen or Andrew—to dedicate it to. The intention was to give the church a "more memorable" name. A series of stained glass memorial windows were donated in 1923. World War II had no significant effect on the church, although it was used as a shelter for people displaced from their homes by bomb damage, and by the Ministry of Labour as a base from which to make payments to vulnerable people. During World War I, soldiers had been based in the church hall, and 25 years later a similar thing happened when the manse (the minister's house) was requisitioned for army use. New members also joined the congregation during World War II: worshippers at St Columba's Presbyterian Church on the northwest corner of Warrior Square, St Leonards-on-Sea, were displaced when their church (founded in 1883) was destroyed by a bomb in 1942.

The church joined the new United Reformed denomination in 1972, and took in former members of the Red Lake Congregational Church in Ore when that church closed in 1973. (Founded in 1903 and built by important local architect Henry Ward, the building survived until its demolition in 1980.) In 1979, a joint pastorate was created when St Luke's Church was administratively joined to the smaller St Mark's Church in the Blacklands area of Hastings. A third church, in the nearby town of Rye, was added to the pastorate in 1980, but after this church closed in 1986 the pastorate was dissolved and St Luke's Church administered its own affairs again.

Overnight on 15/16 October 1987—the night of the Great Storm, one of Britain's most disastrous weather events—St Luke's Church was severely damaged by the winds, which gusted to hurricane force. At about 7.00am, the spire was torn from the tower and flung through the roof of the north aisle, from which it protruded at a hazardous angle—threatening the terraced houses opposite. After the storm subsided, a crane lifted the spire out of the church and left it in the garden while the rest of the building was repaired. The church hall was used for worship until temporary repairs were carried out. Other churches in Hastings offered assistance: the Roman Catholic Church of St Thomas of Canterbury and English Martyrs hosted weddings, and St Matthew's Church raised money from special collections. Rebuilding work, which included a new vestry and larger kitchen, was completed in time for a reopening ceremony on 29 April 1990. The spire was taken away for repair, but could not be saved; the tower was rebuilt and a much smaller "cap"-style spire was added in its place. (Coincidentally, St Leonards-on-Sea Congregational Church also lost its spire during the storm; it was never replaced.)

In 2000, a clock was inset into the front wall of the tower as a celebration of the millennium, and a new wooden font was donated in 2003. In the same year, the minister moved to a new, larger manse.

== Architecture ==
Henry Carpenter's chapel has been added to several times since its construction in 1857, but still retains its Early English Gothic appearance. It is built entirely of stone, and has a tower at the west end (now with a low pyramid-shaped spire), an aisled nave, chancel, partly glazed wooden porch, vestry, kitchen and a large attached hall. The windows are mostly lancets; some have stained glass.

== The church today ==
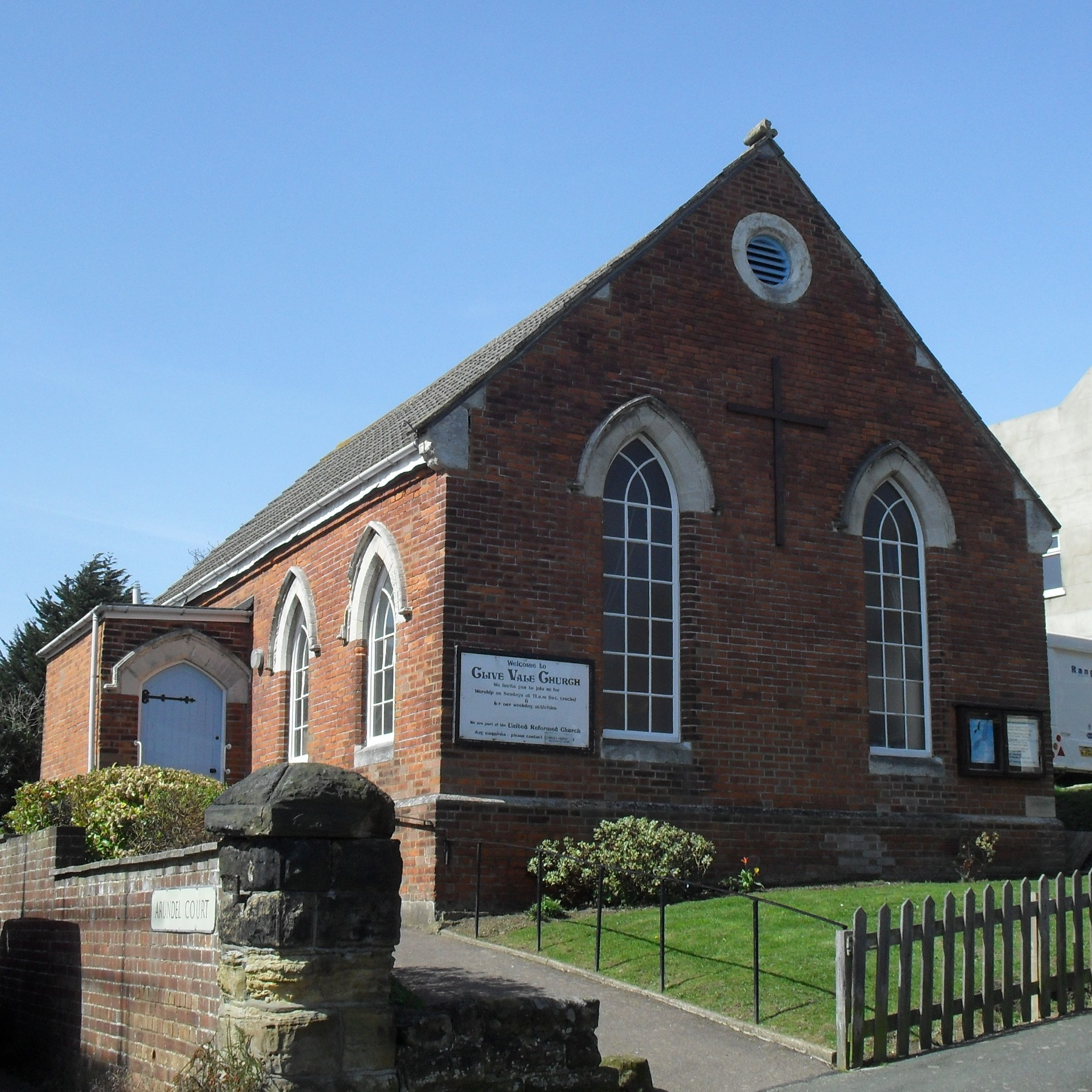
Clive Vale United Reformed Church is one of three others of that denomination in Hastings.

As of 2010, St Luke's Church was one of four United Reformed churches in the borough of Hastings. The others were St Mark's Church at Blacklands, Clive Vale United Reformed Church in the Clive Vale area and Robertson Street United Reformed Church in Hastings town centre. All four were in the Southern Synod, one of 13 Synods in Great Britain, which is responsible for United Reformed churches in South London and the counties of Kent, East Sussex, West Sussex and Surrey in southeast England. Robertson Street United Reformed Church closed in 2012.

Hastings historian J. Manwaring Baines considered Silverhill Independent Chapel to be the most important church built during the town's 19th-century growth "in view of its determination to overcome all difficulties". When it joined the Presbyterian church in 1862, it became one of the first such churches in southeast England. On 5 October 1972, the congregation joined the newly formed United Reformed Church denomination, created from the merger of those English Presbyterian churches which had voted in, those Congregational churches which had not opted out, and congregations of the Re-formed Church of Christ. It has been known since then as St Luke's United Reformed Church.

The church is licensed for worship in accordance with the Places of Worship Registration Act 1855 and has the registration number 23397.

== See also ==
- List of places of worship in Hastings
