= Wellington Square Baptist Church, Hastings =

Church in East Sussex, England

Wellington Square Baptist Church
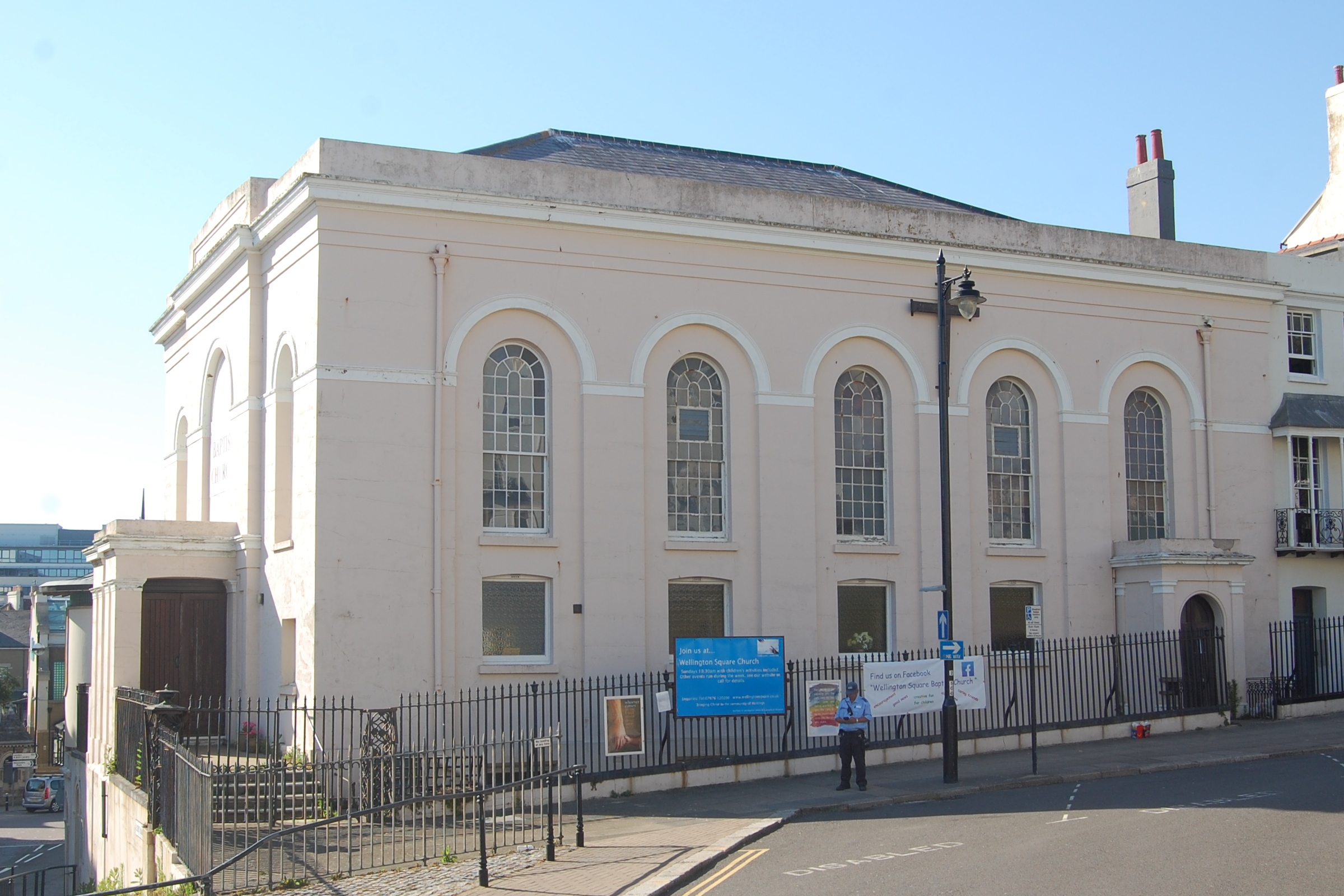
- The church from the southeast, seen in June 2020

- Location within East Sussex
- 50°51′22″N 00°34′55″E
- OS grid reference: TQ 81817 09457
- Location: 47 Wellington Square, Hastings, East Sussex TN34 1PN
- Country: England
- Denomination: Baptist
- Churchmanship: Contemporary
- Website: www.wellingtonsquare.co.uk

History
- Status: Church
- Founded: May 1838
- Founder: Joseph Fletcher

Architecture
- Functional status: Active
- Heritage designation: Grade II*
- Designated: 19 January 1951
- Style: Neoclassical
- Years built: 1838
- Completed: 1838

Administration
- Division: East Sussex Network
- District: South Eastern Baptist Association

Clergy
- Pastor: Vacancy

Wellington Square Baptist Church is a Baptist church in the centre of Hastings, a town and seaside resort in East Sussex, England. It was built in 1838 for a congregation which had previously been meeting for worship in hired premises, and it has been in continuous use since then. Rev. W. Barker, a long-serving minister in the 19th century, revived the church after it was split by a secession and later helped to establish Baptist chapels in two other parts of Hastings. The church forms the northwest corner of Wellington Square, one of the town's earliest residential developments, and its stuccoed Neoclassical exterior harmonises with the surrounding houses. Historic England has listed the church at Grade II* for its architectural and historical importance.

== History ==
The ancient town of Hastings developed rapidly as a popular seaside resort in the first decades of the 19th century, and housing and other facilities quickly spread beyond the confines of the Old Town. Development of Wellington Square began in 1817, two years after the land was bought by the Hastings Bank—a local financial institution owned by Messrs Breeds, Farncomb and Wenham. Work started in the southeastern corner of the site, initially called Wellington Place, and continued until well into the 1820s. The lime kilns which had previously occupied the site supplied much of the building material for the houses.

A group of friends began to meet for worship in 1836, initially in a hired room in Waterloo Passage near the High Street in Hastings Old Town. They were supported by the Kent and Sussex Baptist Association. Soon afterwards, shipbuilder Joseph Fletcher moved from London with his ill daughter, whose health improved while in Hastings. Out of gratitude for this, he paid for the congregation to use the Assembly Rooms at the Swan Hotel for their meetings and for a minister to serve them. Work started on a permanent chapel building for the congregation using money they had raised for this purpose, and in May 1838 he officially founded the church and the chapel opened. The three-sided sea-facing Wellington Square had a gap at the western end, and the chapel was built there.

Around 1864 a secession occurred which caused Wellington Square's minister at the time to leave and set up a new church, the Memorial Chapel. This opened on 30 August 1865 but was no longer in use by the time it was sold in 1882. The secession took away many members of the church and left its membership very low: for a time "things were in such a bad state" that it was decided to close and sell the chapel, but under new minister Rev. W. Barker the cause began to prosper again. Under his ministry the church was responsible for founding a Baptist mission hall in the Halton area of Hastings. This opened on 12 December 1871 and was formally registered for worship between March 1890 and December 1947. (Note: By 1882 it was being referred to as "the Halton Branch of Wellington Square Baptist Chapel".) A new church, Halton Baptist Church, was registered in April 1957 and remains in use. Similarly, a few years after the original church at Halton was founded, members of the chapel carried out ministry in the neighbouring resort of St Leonards-on-Sea with the aim of establishing a Baptist church there, and one was formed in 1881. St Leonard's Baptist Church was built in 1882–83 and opened the following year. In about 1875 Barker was also made responsible for a struggling Baptist chapel at New Romney in Kent. By 1887 attendances had risen, the building had been enlarged and a mission pastor had been employed to help.

The chapel was closed for some time during early 1873 while the building and its schoolrooms were repaired and altered at a cost of £300. It reopened on 26 June 1873. Further alterations were carried out five years later to the design of local architect Thomas Elworthy and at a cost of £750: two additional galleries were installed and the existing one was extended, and new fittings were installed.

Wellington Square Baptist Church remains in use for worship and by a wide range of community groups. It is one of three surviving church buildings opened in the first half of the 19th century in Hastings, and the only one still in religious use: the others are the former Ebenezer Particular Baptist Chapel (1817) and the former Church of St Mary-in-the-Castle (1828). The chapel was listed at Grade II* by English Heritage, the predecessor of Historic England, on 19 January 1951. This defines it as a "particularly important" building of "more than special interest". As of February 2001, it was one of 13 Grade II* listed buildings, and 535 listed buildings of all grades, in the borough of Hastings.

== Architecture ==
The chapel was designed as an integral part of Wellington Square, an "ambitious" three-sided square of stuccoed houses. Along with nearby Pelham Square it is one of "the two principal planned developments of early 19th-century Hastings". The chapel is also stuccoed and is in the Neoclassical style. It has tall arched windows and a moulded cornice with a parapet, behind which is set the hipped slate roof. The main elevation faces into the square and has five bays, each with an arched sash window set in a "giant" arched recess. A projecting round-arched porch is in the right-hand (north-eastern) bay. The side (south) elevation has three bays, the middle of which projects slightly and is topped by a shallow pediment. Below this is a large arched recess. The side bays have tall arched sash windows with smaller windows below. At ground-floor level is a projecting porch with a side entrance, central window and two pairs of plain pilasters.

The chapel was built on top of a schoolroom and lecture room. The school moved to a new building at Bourne Walk at some point between 1868 and 1876.

== Administration ==
The church is registered for worship in accordance with the Places of Worship Registration Act 1855; its number on the register is 56902. Under the name Baptist Chapel it was registered for the solemnisation of marriages in accordance with the Marriage Act 1836 on 8 May 1841. The church is part of the East Sussex Network of the South Eastern Baptist Association, one of 13 regional divisions within Baptists Together (the Baptist Union of Great Britain).

== See also ==
- Media related to Wellington Square Baptist Church at Wikimedia Commons
- Grade II* listed buildings in Hastings
- List of places of worship in Hastings

== Bibliography ==
- Antram, Nicholas; Pevsner, Nikolaus (2013). Sussex: East with Brighton and Hove. The Buildings of England. London: Yale University Press. ISBN 978-0-300-18473-0.
- Elleray, D. Robert (1979). Hastings: a Pictorial History. Chichester: Phillimore & Co. ISBN 0-85033-324-5.
- Elleray, D. Robert (2004). Sussex Places of Worship. Worthing: Optimus Books. ISBN 0-9533132-7-1.
- Harris, Roland B. (2010). Hastings Historic Character Assessment Report (PDF) (Report). East Sussex County Council, West Sussex County Council and Brighton and Hove City Council. Archived (PDF) from the original on 22 January 2021.
- Stell, Christopher (2002). Nonconformist Chapels and Meeting-houses in Eastern England. Swindon: English Heritage. ISBN 1-873592-50-7.
