= Holy Trinity Church, Hastings =

Holy Trinity Church
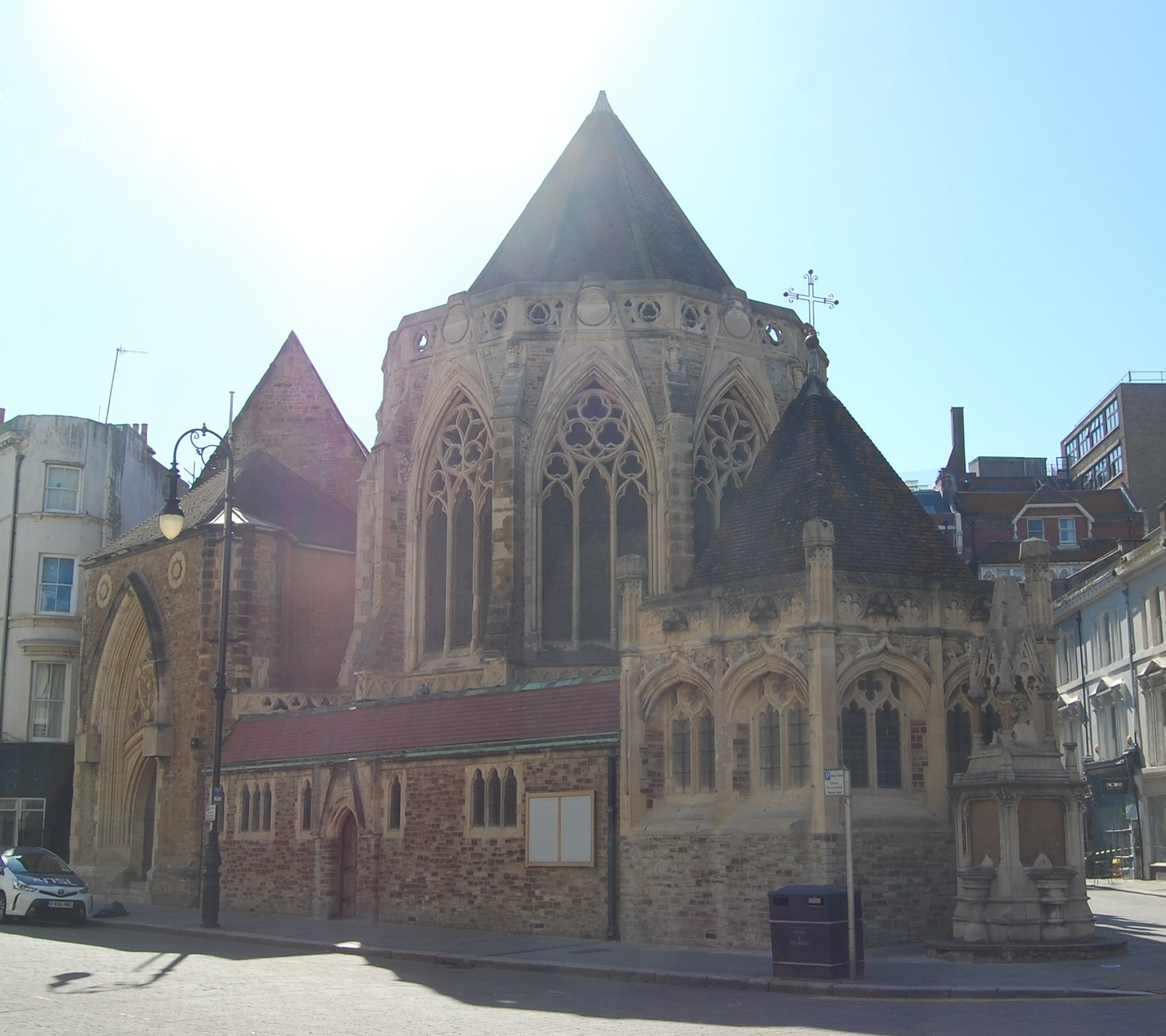
- The church from the southeast
- Holy Trinity Church
- 50.8551°N 0.5767°E
- OS grid reference: TQ 81461 09340
- Location: Robertson Street/Trinity Street, Hastings, East Sussex
- Country: England
- Denomination: Church of England
- Churchmanship: Charismatic Evangelical
- Website: http://www.hthchurch.org/

History
- Status: Parish church
- Founded: 1851
- Founder: Countess Waldegrave
- Dedication: Holy Trinity
- Consecrated: 1858

Architecture
- Functional status: Active
- Heritage designation: Grade II*
- Designated: 14 September 1976
- Architect: Samuel Sanders Teulon
- Style: Decorated/Early English Gothic Revival
- Groundbreaking: 1856
- Completed: 1859

Administration
- Province: Province of Canterbury
- Diocese: Chichester
- Archdeaconry: Hastings
- Deanery: Rural Deanery of Hastings
- Parish: Hastings Holy Trinity

Holy Trinity Church is an Anglican church in the centre of Hastings, a town and borough in the English county of East Sussex. It was built during the 1850s—a period when Hastings was growing rapidly as a seaside resort—by prolific and eccentric architect Samuel Sanders Teulon, who was "chief among the rogue architects of the mid-Victorian Gothic Revival". The Decorated/Early English-style church is distinguished by its opulently decorated interior and its layout on a difficult town-centre site, chosen after another location was found to be unsuitable. The church took eight years to build, and a planned tower was never added. English Heritage has listed the building at Grade II* for its architectural and historical importance.

== History ==
Although it was an ancient port and fishing town with origins well before 928, when it was first mentioned in a written document, Hastings developed so rapidly in the 19th century that it is now principally a Victorian town. Improved transport links, putting it within reach of daytrippers from London, made it an extremely popular seaside resort and a "wealthy, successful town of strength and confidence". For part of the 19th century it was one of Britain's most fashionable resorts.

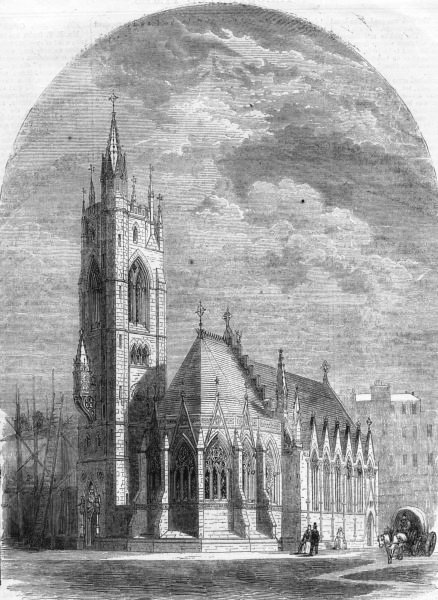
c1860 woodcut showing the proposed tower that was never added.

The growth of the town encouraged church-building, particularly by the Church of England. The Old Town area of Hastings had seven churches in the 13th century, but medieval decline and encroachment from the sea left only two—All Saints Church and St Clement's Church—by the start of the 19th century. The subsequent development of Hastings outgrew the compact valley around the Bourne stream on which the Old Town was centred, and moved further and further west as more land was required. Between 1801 and 1821, the population increased from 2,982 (90% of whom lived in the Old Town) to 6,051. Soon afterwards, James Burton's high-class planned town of St Leonards-on-Sea, even further west, attracted more people to the area, and the gap between it and Hastings was soon filled. The town's focus had shifted away from the Old Town and its churches, and new places of worship were soon planned. The first in the new part of Hastings was St Mary-in-the-Castle, built as the centrepiece of a residential crescent in 1824 to replace an ancient collegiate church which was actually part of Hastings Castle.

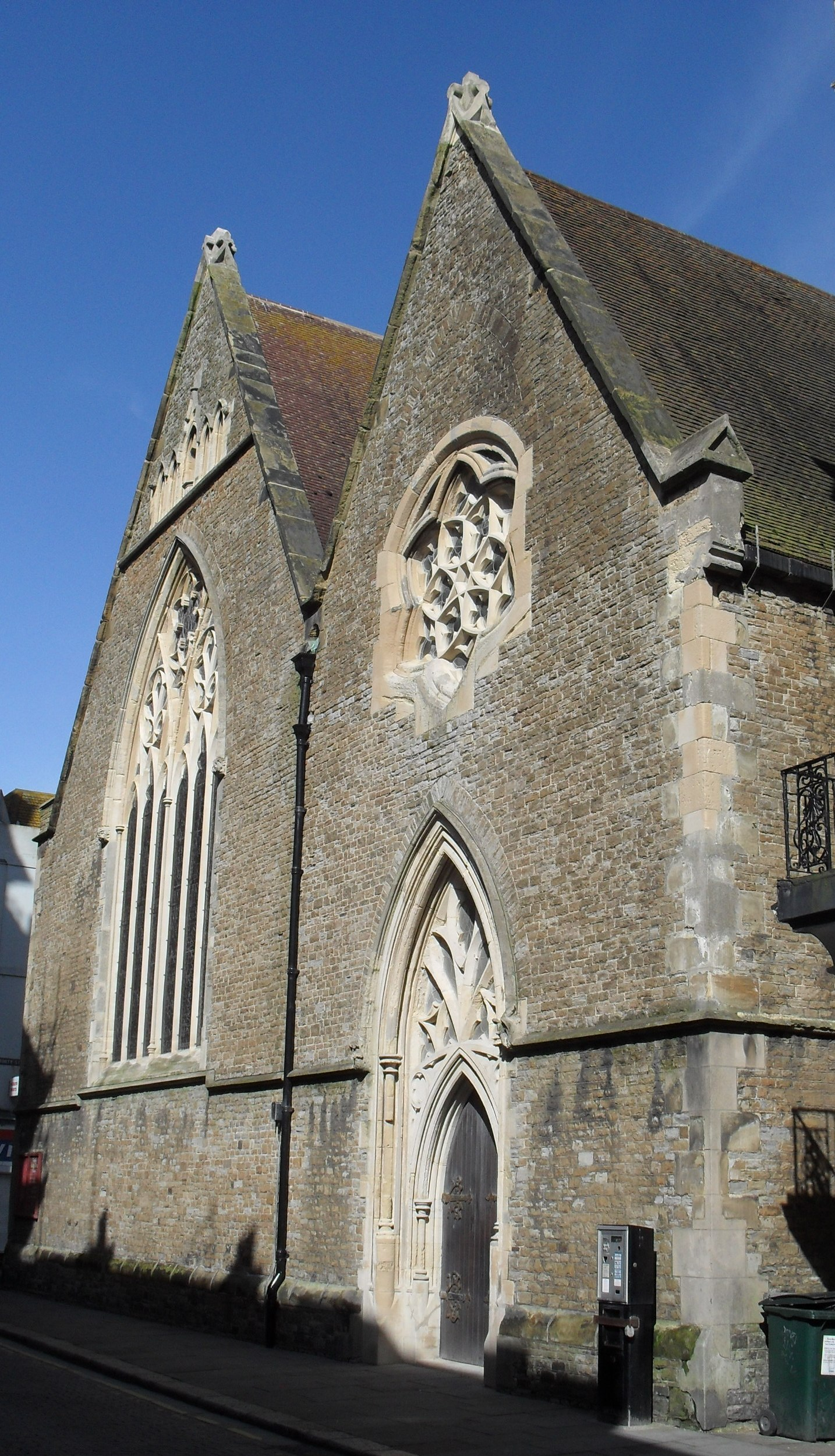
The gabled west end has a large six-light window.

In 1851, Hastings railway station was built, and nearby land was developed at the same time to form Cambridge Road, Robertson Street and Trinity Street. This had been an undeveloped wasteland with some squatters' shacks known as the America Ground. This area was chosen as the site of the second Anglican church in "new" Hastings. Local philanthropist and church benefactor Countess Waldegrave gave £1,000 (£120,700 in 2025)) to help pay for its founding, and Samuel Sanders Teulon was commissioned to design the building. He had recently submitted plans for a large house in Hastings, and had designed and executed churches at nearby Rye Harbour and Icklesham. A piece of land on the north side of Cambridge Road, above Holmesdale Gardens (approximate location 50.8558°N 0.5751°E), was donated by the Earls Cornwallis; but soon after work started, a landslip revealed the site to be unsafe. About £500 (£60,400 in 2025)) had already been spent. The church authorities selected another site nearby, but had to pay £2,500 (£301,800 in 2025)) to The Crown for it. The site was extremely awkward because the junction of Robertson and Trinity Streets formed a very acute angle.

The engineer was John Howell & Son. Work started on the new site in 1857: Countess Waldegrave laid the foundation stone on 22 July of that year. The nave was the first part of the church to be consecrated, in 1858, and the church opened for worship at this time. The chancel was finished the following year but was not consecrated until 1862.

Local resident Lady St John had been another donor to the church building fund: she provided £200 (£24,100 in 2025)). She was so concerned about the displacement of poor people from the former wasteland area that she paid for a new church to be built in St Leonards-on-Sea, where many had been forced to move. Christ Church opened on the London Road there in 1860.

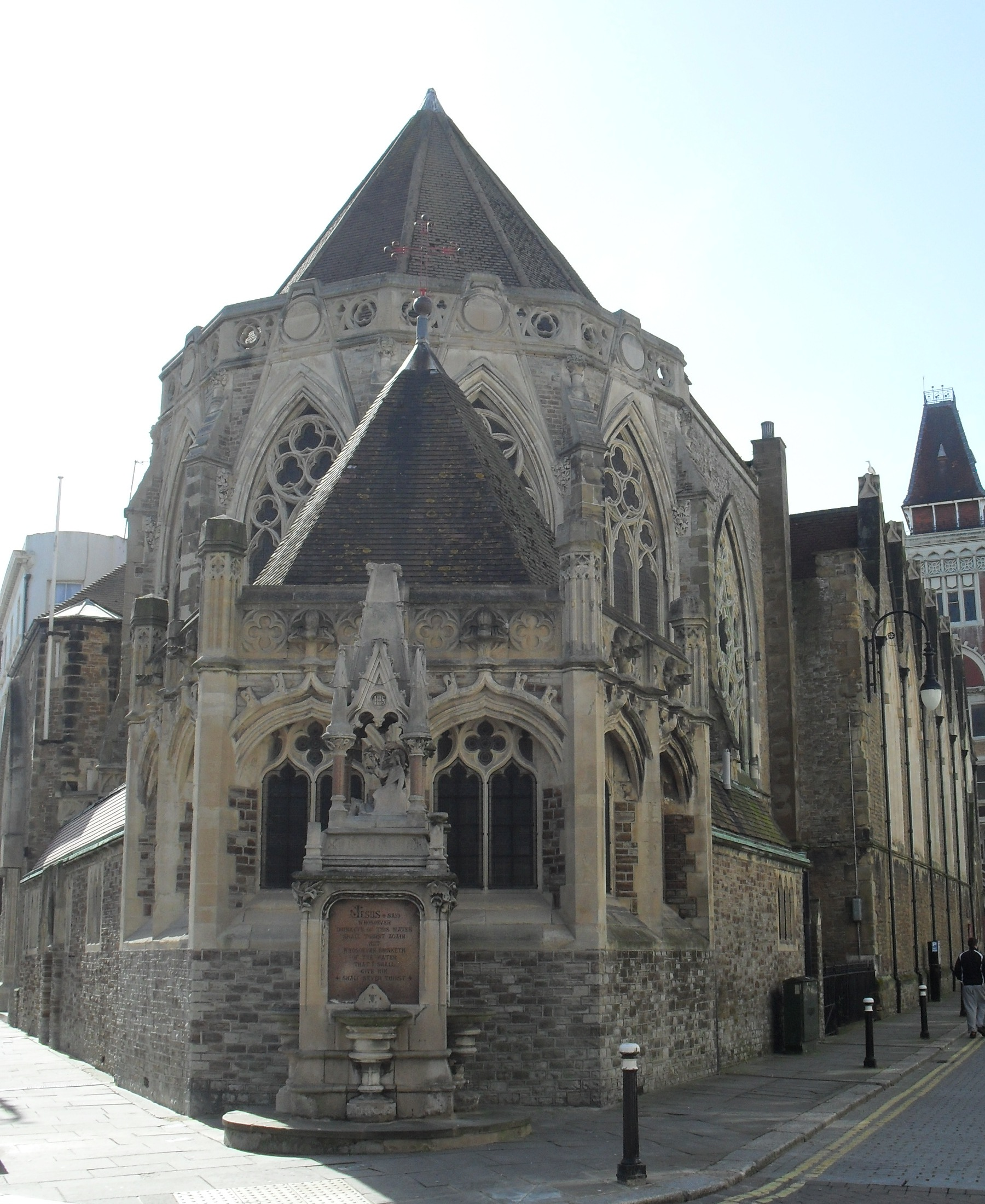
The east end has a conical-roofed vestry in front of the apse.

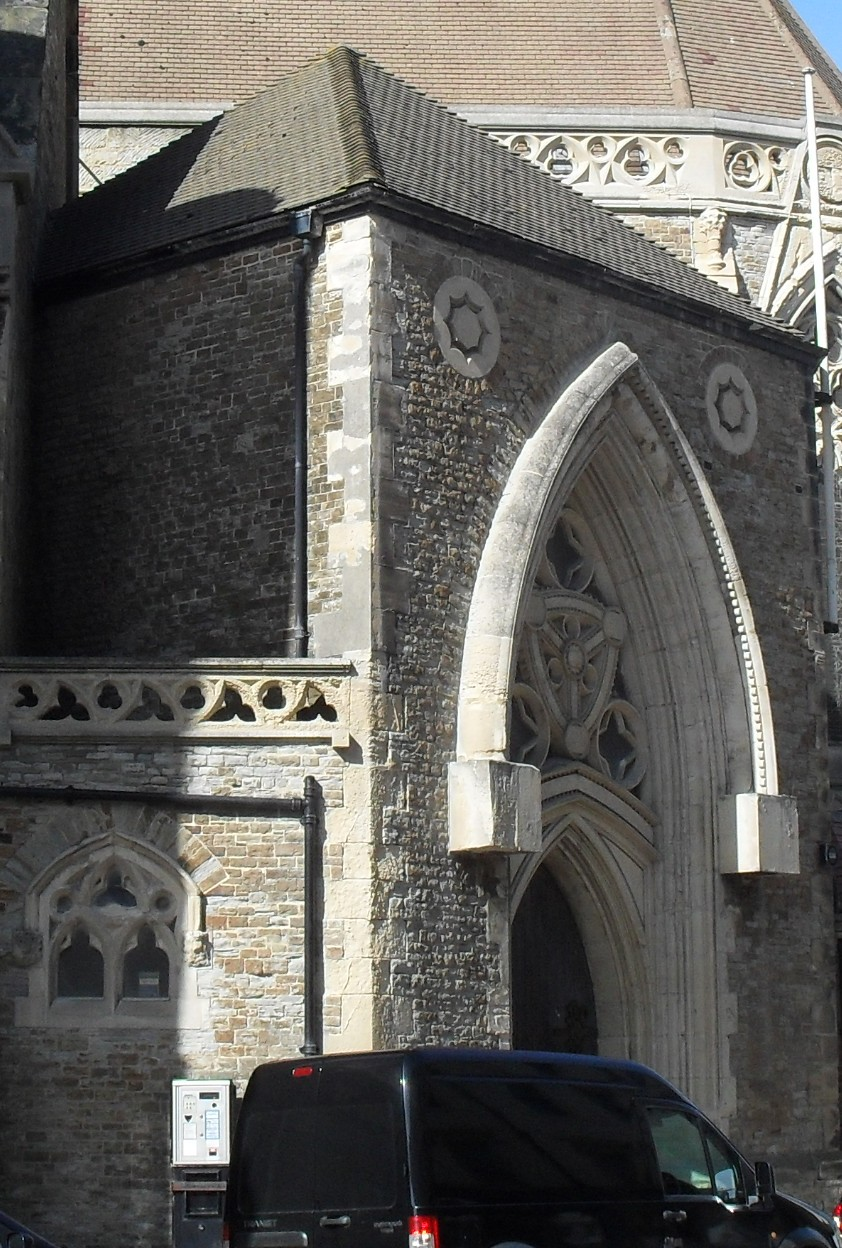
The porch was intended to bear a tower.

A major alteration came in 1892, when a polygonal vestry was built beyond the chancel. Next to it, on the south side, space above the porch was intended to hold a tower and spire, but because the church cost so much to build neither feature was ever added. Between 1889 and 1890, the chancel arch was given intricate carved decoration by sculptor Thomas Earp, and a craftsman from Ghent provided an ornate rood screen. W. H. Romaine-Walker designed an "exceptional" alabaster and marble pulpit with a double staircase around the same time. He had also been responsible for the vestry and other general refitting in the church. London architect Henry Ward, who moved to Hastings and carried out most of his work in the town, was responsible for an unusual miniature Lady chapel (formed out of the base of the organ chamber) and some work on the doors and windows at the start of the 20th century. Later in the century, master calligrapher Edward Johnston provided a high-quality illuminated vellum-covered missal.

== Architecture ==
Samuel Sanders Teulon had to fit his design for Holy Trinity Church into the difficult, restricted town centre site (described by Nikolaus Pevsner as "crazy"), and the layout is consequently very unusual. The nave is of six bays and has a south aisle, a chancel with an apse, a vestry with a conical roof, and a porch formed from the base of the intended tower. The west end, facing Claremont, has two gables and a large lancet window with tracery and stone dressings. The north side, facing Trinity Street, is divided into six cross-gabled bays, each with a three-light window with similar tracery. There are similar windows in the apse, and a more intricate example in the north face of the chancel. The porch, set at an angle facing Robertson Street, leads into the south aisle. The tall structure is dominated by a large figure of the Trinity in its tympanum. A shallow hipped roof takes the place of the planned tower. The church combines the Decorated and Early English Gothic styles and is built entirely of stone, mostly rubble laid out in courses. Teulon's typical style was "vigorous and idiosyncratic Gothic", and he had a "highly individual command" of that architectural movement.

Inside, the roof of the chancel is intricately carved (especially on its corbels), and similar work above the organ chamber and chancel arch was added during the late 19th-century remodelling. All of the carvings were by Thomas Earp. The small Lady chapel, fitted in below the organ chamber, is a unique feature. The font dates from the opening of the church, but the highly detailed foliage carving on the stem and base was executed in 1903.

== Organ ==
There was originally a small organ described as a 'Double Decker' during the tenure of Canon Crosse. Thomas Cramp, who was blind served as assistant organist here for over 65 years. In 1896 a three-manual Norman Beard instrument was installed in the chancel. In 1908, part of this instrument was removed by Heslop of Exeter to its present position, the choir organ only remaining in the chancel.

== The church today ==
Holy Trinity Church was listed at Grade C by English Heritage on 14 September 1976, and was later upgraded to Grade II*. (Grade C, part of a mostly superseded scale used by English Heritage only for Anglican churches, is equivalent to the lower Grade II.) As a Grade II*-listed building, it is considered "particularly important ... [and] of more than special interest". In February 2001, it was one of 13 Grade II* listed buildings, and 535 listed buildings of all grades, in the borough of Hastings.

The parish of Holy Trinity covers Hastings town centre. The boundaries (clockwise from southwest) are Falaise Road, Linton Road, Amherst Road, Lower Park Road, Mann Street, South Terrace, Queens Road, Harold Place and the seafront.

Critical assessment of the church in the 20th century was generally positive. The Victoria County History of Sussex, written in 1937, referred to "a rather florid rendering of the Decorated style" in its description, while Sussex church historian Robert Elleray described it as "among the finest Victorian churches in Sussex", and the interior as one of the best in any church in the county. The epithet "the Cathedral of Hastings" has regularly been used.

In November 2014, a planting team from St Peter's Church, Brighton began a new phase of life at Holy Trinity; the church became part of the HTB network of churches and is now usually referred to as HTH.

== See also ==
- List of places of worship in Hastings

== Bibliography ==
- Elleray, D. Robert (1981). The Victorian Churches of Sussex. Chichester: Phillimore & Co. Ltd. ISBN 0-85033-378-4.
- Elleray, D. Robert (2004). Sussex Places of Worship. Worthing: Optimus Books. ISBN 0-9533132-7-1.
- Marchant, Rex (1997). Hastings Past. Chichester: Phillimore & Co. ISBN 1-86077-046-0.
- Nairn, Ian; Pevsner, Nikolaus (1965). The Buildings of England: Sussex. Harmondsworth: Penguin Books. ISBN 0-14-071028-0.
- Salzman, L.F., ed. (1973) [1937]. A History of Sussex. The Victoria Histories of the Counties of England. Vol. 9. Folkestone: Dawsons of Pall Mall (originally Oxford: Oxford University Press). ISBN 0-7129-0590-1.
- Thornton, David (1987). Hastings: a Living History. Hastings: The Hastings Publishing Co. ISBN 0-9512201-0-1.
