= America Ground =

Area in England

Coordinates: 50°51′17.91″N 0°34′34.51″E

The America Ground is the name of an approximately triangular area bordered by Robertson Street, Carlisle Parade, Harold Place and Claremont in Hastings, East Sussex, England. In the early 19th century, this was considered to be outside the boundaries of the town; the western boundary being marked by the Priory Bridge situated immediately to the east of this area.

Itinerant builders who were employed in the large scale construction works taking place during the early 19th century around the town and St Leonards having no readily available accommodation, settled in this area of land. This area became almost an entirely self-sufficient district. Prior to being cleared in 1850, the area consisted largely of Ropewalks and shacks although there were a few more-substantial buildings. Post 1850, the land was transferred to the Crown, becoming the property of the Chief Commissioner for Woods and Forests, remaining in Crown possession to the current day.

== Pre-settlement ==
Prior to becoming closed up by the accumulation of shingle after the great storm of 1287, the area was once part of the river mouth of the Priory Stream.The stream used to be navigable up to approximately the location of Hole Farm (near Blacklands Church) and formed a large natural harbour at the stream's mouth. The land was part of the property of the Augustinian Priory of the Holy Trinity, becoming the Priory Farm more recently.

== Occupation by itinerants ==
When the new town of St. Leonards by James Burton and the development of Pelham Crescent designed by the architect Joseph Kaye commenced during the 1820s, a large itinerant workforce migrated to the town, it being reported that they “took possession without leave, licence, or interference, and built houses, shanties, warehouses, and other erections, for which they paid no rent or consideration; a ‘No Mans Land` and independent of any law or order and, who when challenged hoisted the American Flag, very much a symbol of independence at that time". Other settlers followed this workforce, resulting in the approximately 8 acres of foreshore becoming home to nearly 200 buildings and over 1000 residents. The names of the earliest inhabitants were recorded as being Thomas Page and John Prior in 1806. They lived in an old hulk the remains of the brig Polymina, which had been converted into two dwellings.

As the area became populated, many trades appeared in the area including a gardener, carpenter, miller together with Lodging houses, as well as limekilns, stonemasons, a tallow factory, a sawing house and a butchers with slaughter houses and piggeries. There was even a gin palace, the Black Horse run by Daniel Thomas, and a small school founded by William Parker – the forerunner of Hastings Grammar School.

Some of the occupiers had signed leases or gained permission from Lord Chichester, who claimed the whole of the area as owner or Lord under a grant thereof in the reign of James the First and others had sanction from the Corporation of Hastings, under a grant made to the Corporation under Queen Elizabeth.

Many of the properties were found by a survey undertaken in 1829 to be either in the ownership of Mr. Thomas James Breeds, Mr. Thomas Breeds, and Mr. Mark Boykett Breeds, or associated with them.

== Perception of the America Ground ==
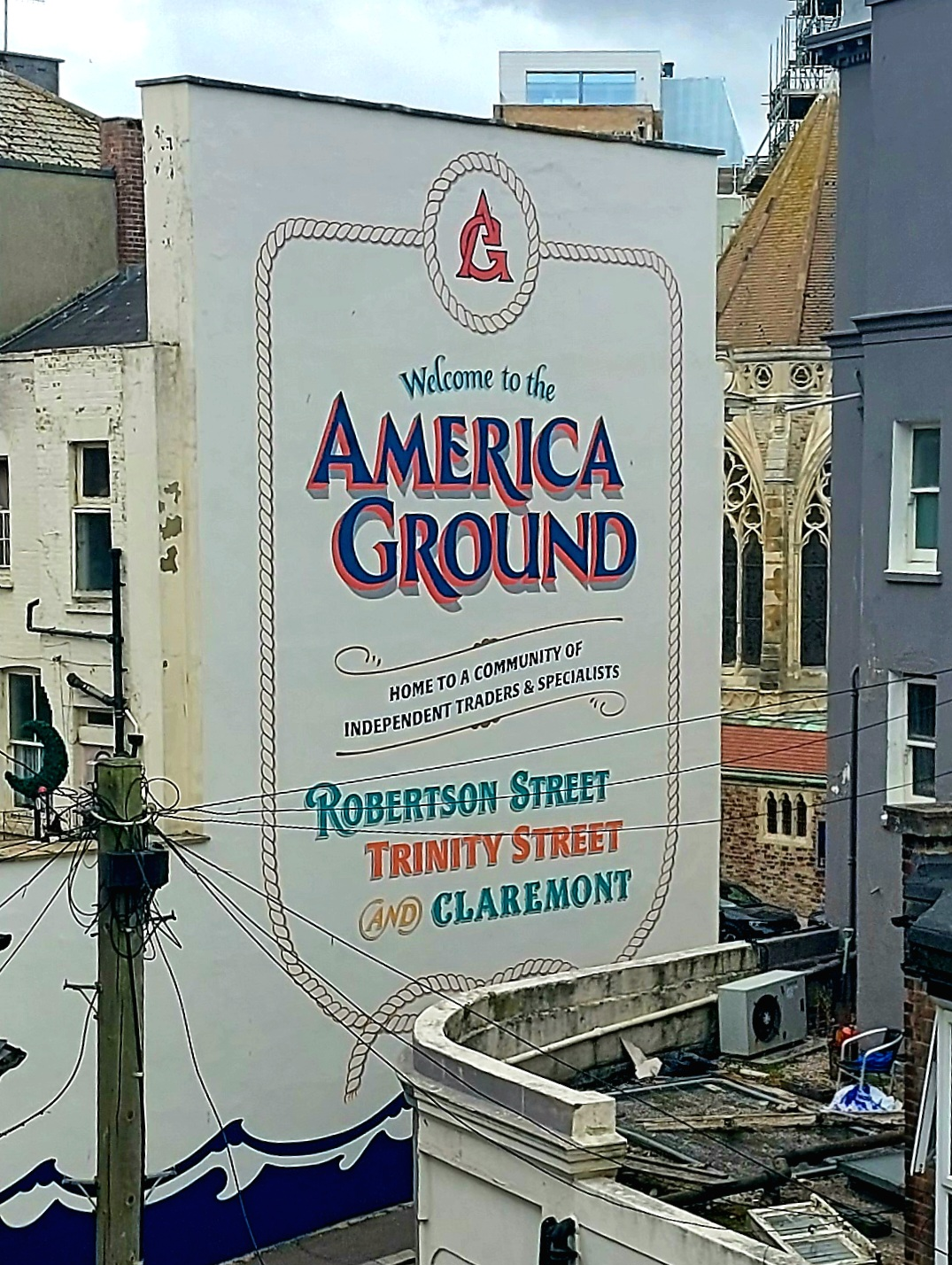
The America Ground mural at Robertson Passage

In general the occupants of the America Ground were considered to be little more than smugglers, thieves and vagabonds. Many of the shacks consisted of half-boats (vessels that had been destroyed by sawing in half at the Condemned Hole) up-ended

Sheila Kaye-Smith in her 1919 book ‘Tamarisk Town’ described the area as having been “free to any beggars, gypsies or other undesirables ... a mock city of shacks, huts and tents.” Barry Funnell however represents that in his book, ‘The America Ground’; 'is that of a diverse, industrious, self-contained community'.

J. Manwaring Baines in Historic Hastings gives the following exchange between the, then Pierwarden, Charles Picknell and counsel during the hearing on the area;

"Witness: You were not thought respectable then, if you were not a smuggler"

"Counsel: That was true of other places besides America?"
"Witness: Oh, yes, they were all smugglers, Parsons and all."
"Vice Chancellor: Do you mean to say that the Parsons also went in for smuggling?"

"Witness: Oh, yes, they used to take a keg for Christmas sometimes, your Honour".

At some point in the early 1800s, bailiffs were sent into the area to apprehend suspected felons. The occupiers of the ground rioted in protest and chased the officials back over the Priory Bridge. The inhabitants raised the American flag, the Stars and Stripes, as a symbol of their independence, which they maintained to the end of their occupation of the land, aping events that had occurred during the American Revolution.

== 1821 map ==
In 1821, the cartographers Abraham Purshouse Driver and Edward Driver, drew a detailed plan of the area which is held at East Sussex County Council's archive (The Keep). The catalogue entry contains the following description;

"A Plan of the land between Cuckoo Hill and The priory on the west and the south end of All Saints Street on the east, that shown by 4 below and to the south of Castle Street showing buildings and other structures in detail; shows Rock Fair Green, The Priory Houses, The Castle Hotel (Thomas Farncombe), The New Parade, The Parade and The Battery; George Street, West Street, Hill Street, High Street, East Bourne Street, All Saints Street, Courthouse Street, Three Post Lane, Winders Lane, John Street, South Parade, Market House and the Fishmarket shown in outline, though apparently with great accuracy; Pelham Terrace and Pelham Place sketched in pencil"

== Inquiry ==
On 5 November 1827, an inquisition was held at the George Hotel, Battle, into the America Ground to determine ownership. In addition to the squatters of the land and the Crown, the adjacent landowners (the Cornwallis and Eversfield Estates) held themselves to be entitled to the land.

After the Battle Commission decreed that the land was the property of the Crown, notices were served on the occupants in May 1828 to prove their claims. Of course, proving of the claims was impossible, but a number of seven year long. leases were granted to those who had buildings on the land. In addition, the detailed plan of the land between Cuckoo Hill and The Priory was annotated to reflect leases

== Eviction ==
On 13 November 1834, the Woods and Forests Commissioners served notice on the tenants that all buildings remaining on the ground after Michaelmas the following year, would be forfeit.

Many of the evicted inhabitants moved to St Leonards, even going as far as removing their houses piece-by-piece and rebuilding them in Gensing Road, Norman Road, Shepherd Street, North Street and London Road among a few other locations; in total, some twenty eight buildings were re-located.

The higher ground along the line of modern-day Cambridge Road was claimed by Lord Cornwallis as being the boundary of his land, leaving the parcel of ground now in Crown ownership.

The ‘Americans’ remained independent until the end. In 1832 they marched to a civic banquet held on Priory Meadow, carrying their flag, which now also included the Union Flag and the Arms of Hastings. The flag was presented to the borough as a gesture of reconciliation.

The 'America Ground' then remained unused for some 15 years other than occasional cricket matches and the Annual Rock Fair which was traditionally held on 26–27 July. The area subsequently became known as the Waste or Derelict lands.

== Development ==
A real estate developer called Patrick Robertson leased the crown lands for 99 years at a rate of £500 per year. His name was later given to Robertson Street. Plans were drawn up by an architectural partnership, Reeks Humbert in 1850 and within six months, the aforementioned Robertson Street, Carlisle Parade and Robertson Terrace were in construction. As an aside, the name Carlisle refers to Lord Carlisle, who was at the time Chief Commissioner of Woods and Forests.

== Landmarks ==
- Brassey Institute
- Observer Building
- Holy Trinity Church
- Robertson Street United Reformed Church

== Current day ==
There have been minimal changes to the architecture of the area over the past 100 years, the only real development being infilling of a 'gap' site between Cambridge Road and Robertson Street. The Hastings Bonfire Society has a tradition since their reformation in 1995 of the Town Crier reading a declaration written by local historian Dennis Collins celebrating the history of the area as part of the annual bonfire procession. On 4 July 1999, a tradition started where the American flag would be raised accompanied by a reading of the American Declaration of Independence. There has been something of a renaissance in the area recently, with projects such as 'The Alley' which opened up the alleyway known locally as 'Gotham Alley' that runs behind the retail premises in Claremont as a community-driven art gallery and space for performing arts
