= Silverhill, East Sussex =

Settlement within Hastings, East Sussex, England

Coordinates: 50.870°N 0.555°E

Silverhill
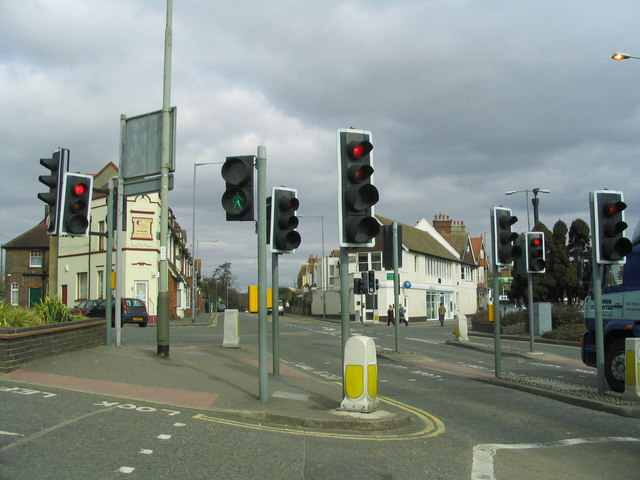
- Silverhill Junction prior to the construction of the Asda store. The buildings on the left were demolished in 2010 as part of that construction work.

- Location within East Sussex
- Population: 4,806 (2011, ward)
- OS grid reference: TQ799109
- District: Hastings
- Shire county: East Sussex
- Region: South East
- Country: England
- Sovereign state: United Kingdom
- Post town: ST. LEONARDS-ON-SEA
- Postcode district: TN37, TN38
- Dialling code: 01424
- Police: Sussex
- Fire: East Sussex
- Ambulance: South East Coast

Silverhill is a suburb and local government ward of Hastings, East Sussex, England. It has a central location within the town, where the A21 meets the B2159 road and Sedlescombe Road South.

== Toponymy ==
The origin of the name Silverhill is unknown: the first documentary record of the name is on Yeakell and Gardner's map of 1783, where it appears as "Salver Hill". Local folk-lore has it that the name derives from the spillage of Roman coins on their journey to the Iron working just north of Hastings.

In the early 18th century this was the location of High Ridge Farm, but by 1815 its name was known as Silver Hill Farm to avoid confusion with farms of a similar name on the ridge near Ore. The tenant farmer was John Standen, and the farm remained with his family until 1842, when it was bought by Francis Smith.

== Economy ==
The Silverhill pottery opened in 1838 and provided an important source of employment for local people. It consisted of a large open shed with a tiled roof and a round kiln where roof tiles and chimney pots were made. There were a row of cottages built for the workers, known as 'Pottery Cottages' adjacent to the main works and clay was obtained from two local sources; Red Clay from Vale Road and White Clay from Forty Acre Field (roughly to the west of Frederick Road)

From the early 1840s, the Pottery was owned by Fred Tree, and among his workers was an artistic potter named John Pelling who was promoted to foreman in 1846. John bought the pottery works five years later and married Fred's daughter, Polly. He became well known for creating a unique style of rustic pottery with a wood-bark design, and according to a local story this was inspired by Polly's maiden name.

The Tivoli Hotel (not to be confused with the Tivoli Tavern situated further up Battle Road and demolished in 2013) stood at the junction of Battle Road (B2159) and Sedlescombe Road North between 1836 and 1860 and, this high-class establishment was so well known that, its local area was known as "Tivoli". The Tivoli Hotel was possibly near where Barclays Silverhill branch now is.

== Modern Silverhill ==
After founding his new town of St Leonards-on-Sea, James Burton gained permission by an Act of Parliament of 1837 to build a turnpike road northwards from Maze Hill to avoid the congestion in Hastings.

However, when this was authorized, the Hastings Council also obtained the necessary Turnpike Act to build a new road towards London. This road started at Hastings town centre and continued through Bohemia into Battle Road, crossing Burton's road at the Tivoli Hotel. Battle Road is now the B2159, and the road that goes through Battle is the A2100.

There were controversies over plans to build an ASDA Superstore on the former Marshall Tufflex site, which, in a poll set up by ASDA, gained 72.8% support. Possibly as a result of these controversies, and some saying that it would cause extra congestion and pollution', the plans were revised in 2009 and the store was officially opened on Monday 15 November 2010, complete with café, pharmacy and large car park with a petrol station which opened in 2014. The development also led to minor changes in the four-way junction in Silverhill, with new and improved street lighting and extra traffic lights to accommodate heavier traffic flows including a bus layby.

== Religious buildings ==
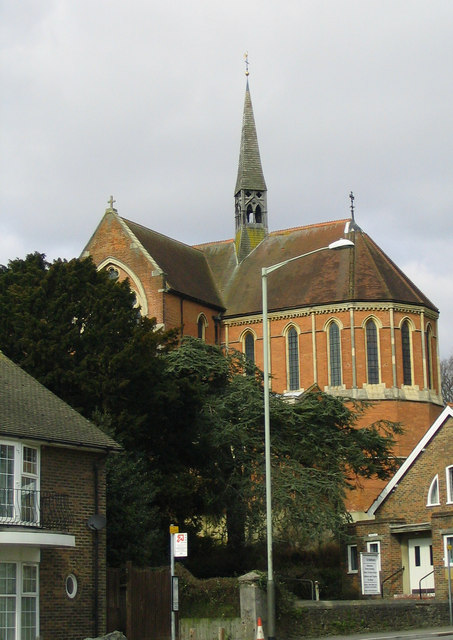
St Matthew's Church

The main church is St Matthew's Church on London Road. The original church was built in 1860 but was rebuilt in 1884 by John Loughborough Pearson, who designed Truro and Brisbane Cathedrals as well as other churches in East Sussex. St Matthew's is a Grade II* listed building. St Luke's United Reformed Church was built in 1857 as Silverhill Independent Presbyterian Chapel, and was one of the oldest Presbyterian places of worship in southern England.
