= St Barnabas Church, Hove =

Church in Brighton and Hove, England

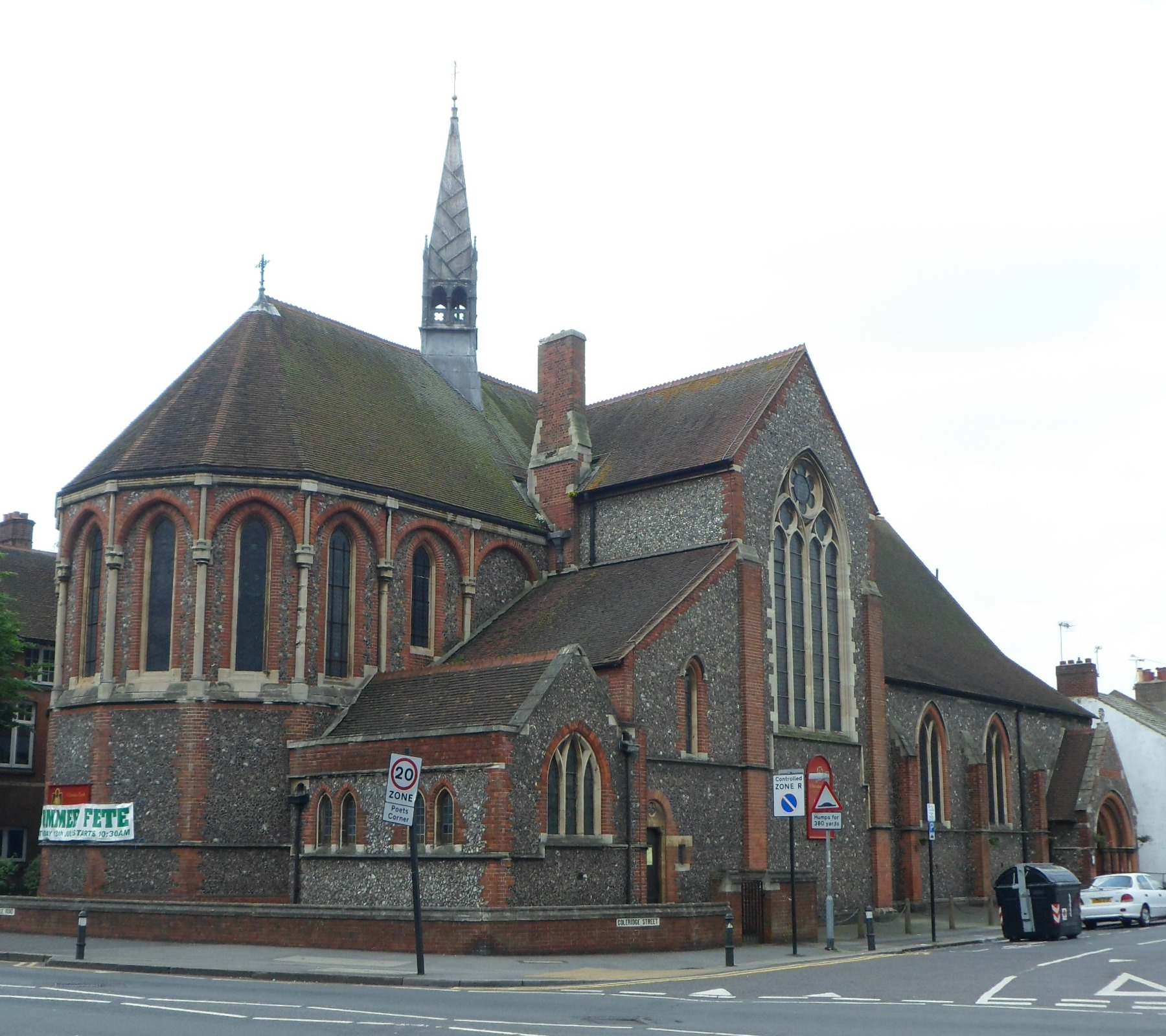
- The church from the northeast
- 50.8346°N 0.1774°W
- Denomination: Church of England
- Churchmanship: Anglo-catholic
- Website: www.stbarnabashove.co.uk

History
- Dedication: St Barnabas

Administration
- Province: Canterbury
- Diocese: Chichester
- Archdeaconry: Chichester
- Deanery: Rural Deanery of Hove
- Parish: Hove, St Barnabas

Clergy
- Vicar(s): Fr John Eldridge SSC

St Barnabas Church is an Anglican church in Hove, part of the English city of Brighton and Hove. It was built between 1882 and 1883 to serve residents of the newly developed streets to the south and west of Hove railway station, which had opened in 1865 and had stimulated growth in the previously undeveloped area between the Brunswick estate to the west and Cliftonville to the east.

== History ==
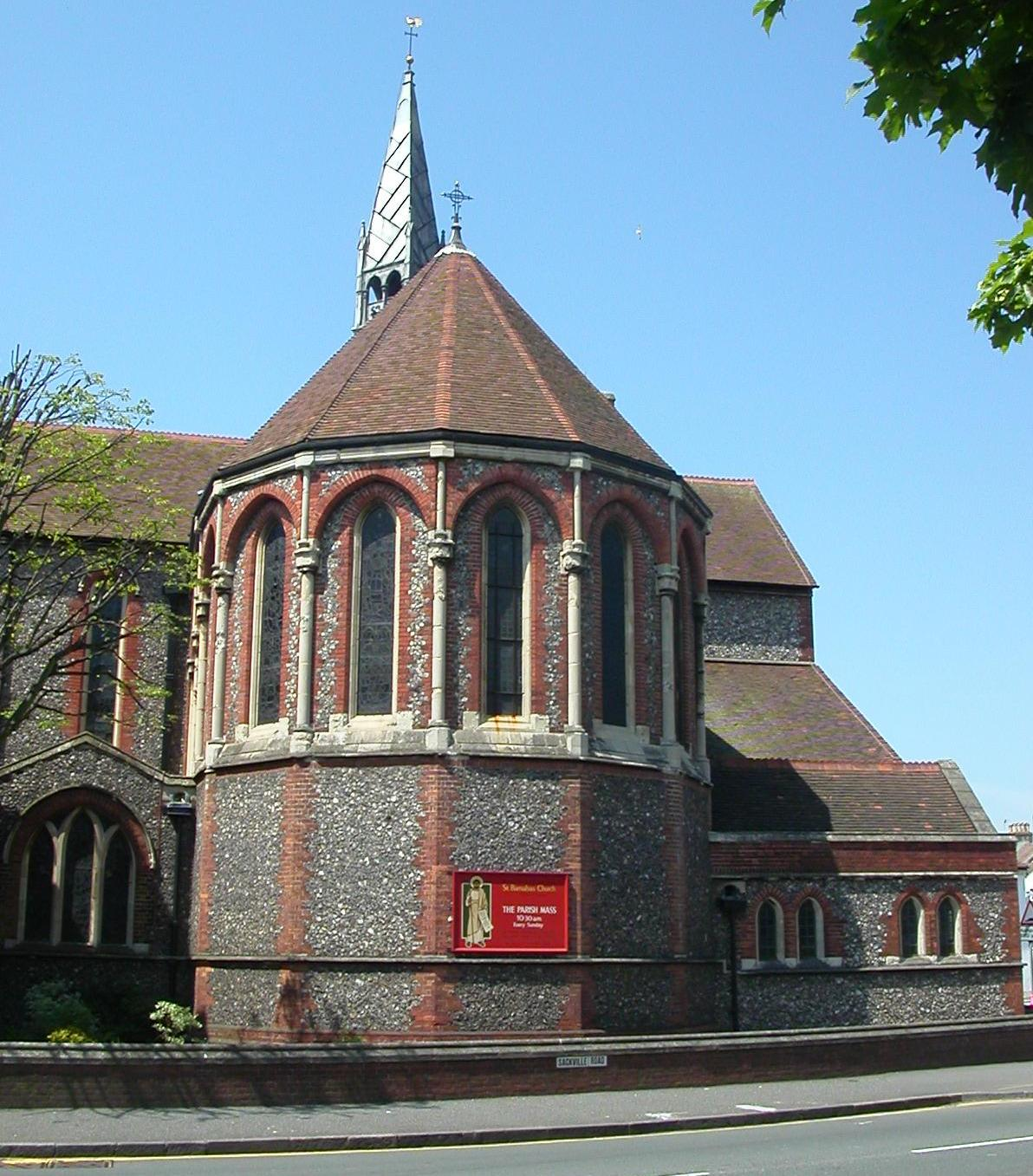
Lancet windows and red-brick decoration on the eastern face

Preston Manor (to the northeast of present-day Hove) and its surrounding land were sold in 1794 to the family of Richard Stanford, who had been a tenant of the house for many years. The house stayed in the family until 1933, but much of the land was developed with housing in the second half of the 19th century. This included substantial building between 1865 and 1880 on land south of the London, Brighton and South Coast Railway's line between Brighton and Portsmouth, with several wide north-south "Avenues" and higher-density housing filling the gap between the Cliftonville area on the edge of Brighton and the outlying Brunswick estate of exclusive houses built between 1830 and 1850. This new district was originally known as "West Brighton", and the station briefly took this name; over time, the area was fully assimilated into Hove, and the station was renamed to reflect the identity of the town as a whole.

In 1879, the former parish of Hove-cum-Preston was divided into two smaller parishes covering Hove and Preston. The first vicar of the newly created Hove parish, Revd Thomas Pearcy, recognised the need for a church in the area, whose population had increased by 10,000 during the most intensive period of development (1865 to 1880). At a meeting on 14 March 1881 at Hove town hall, a piece of land was offered, and this was purchased for £1,500; a subsequent meeting helped to start the fundraising effort, which by June 1881 had generated £2,500 towards the eventual £6,500 cost of construction.

John Loughborough Pearson, who had designed Truro Cathedral two years earlier, was appointed as the architect of St Barnabas Church in 1882; construction started on 27 May 1882, and continued for a year. The Bishop of Chichester, who had laid the first stone, consecrated the new church on 11 June 1883.

== Architecture ==
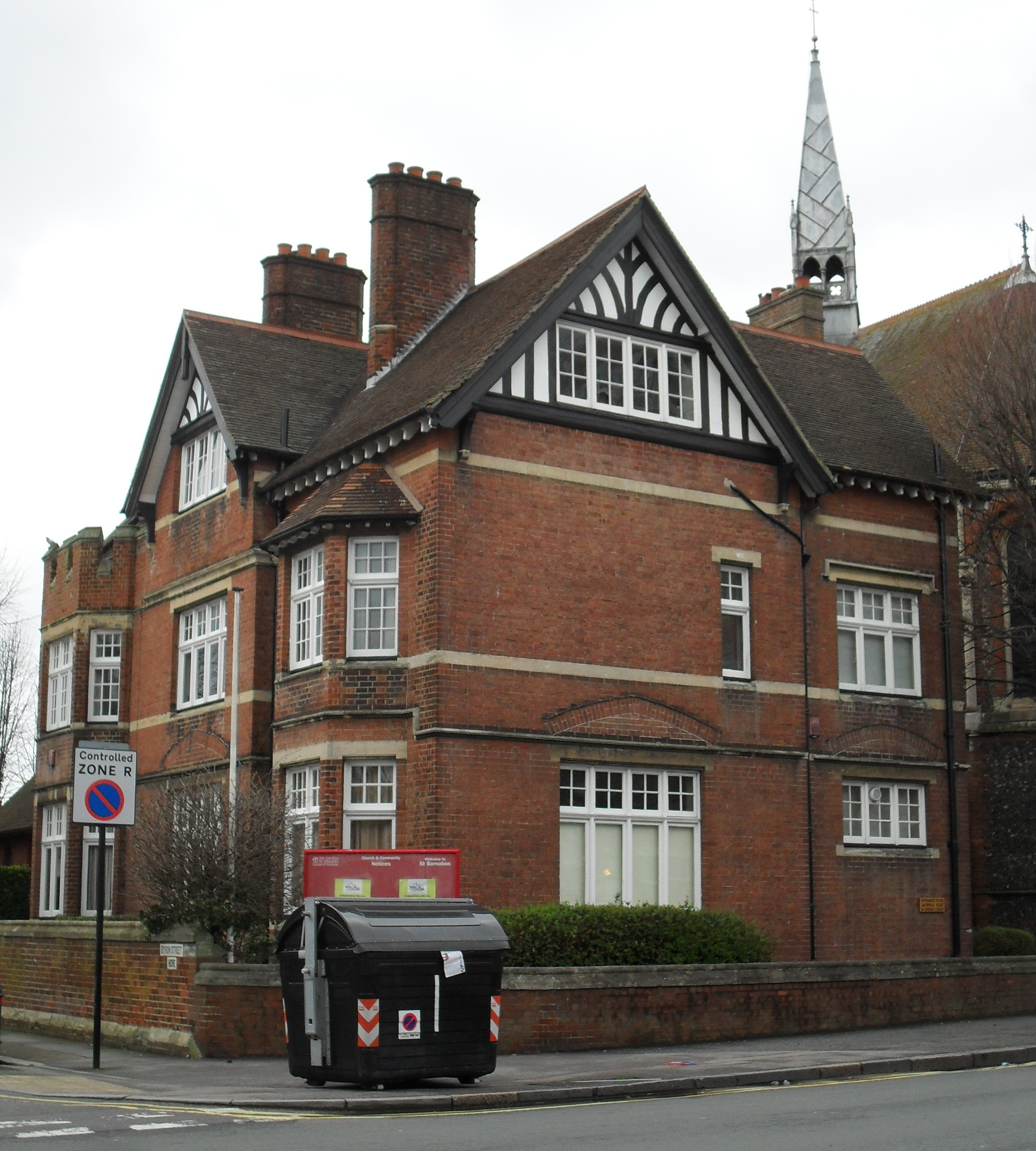
The adjacent vicarage, built in 1893

Although Pearson, having been responsible for the design of many important church buildings throughout Britain in the second half of the 19th century, considered St Barnabas to be one of his less significant works – describing it as "one of my cheap editions" — it has become one of the few Grade II*-listed churches in Brighton and Hove. In common with several other late-19th century churches in the city, such as the Church of the Annunciation, the main construction material was flint which had been knapped to produce flat stones suitable for building walls. The roofline and windows are embellished with red-brick dressings, and the lancet windows reflect the Early English Gothic and Decorated Gothic styles.

A vicarage was added in 1893 by different architects, while in 1907 George Frederick Bodley, an architect closely associated with Brighton's churches, provided a large reredos consisting of a gilded wooden triptych whose central panel depicts the Crucifixion. This was one of Bodley's last works before his death in the same year. A set of choir stalls and a pulpit, both made of oak, were added soon after the church was finished, as was a font of alabaster. There are various stained glass windows, including one commemorating victims of World War I; however a tower intended for the southwestern corner was never completed.

The church's lych gate war memorial commemorates Victor Richardson, Roland Leighton, and Edward Brittain; the "Three Musketeer's" immortalised in Vera Brittain's iconic autobiography of the first world war "Testament of Youth".

== The church today ==
St Barnabas Church was listed at Grade II* by English Heritage on 10 September 1971. As of February 2001, it was one of 70 Grade II*-listed buildings and structures, and 1,218 listed buildings of all grades, in the city of Brighton and Hove.

St Barnabas Church follows a "Modern Catholic" style of worship, with Masses 6 days a week and various other services, including prayer groups. There is also a Sunday school each week.

When St Agnes Church in nearby Goldstone Lane, a parished church within the same benefice as St Barnabas, was closed in 1977, its parish was amalgamated with that of St Barnabas. The parish now covers a large area on both sides of the railway line, as far north as the A270 Old Shoreham Road.

== See also ==
- List of places of worship in Brighton and Hove
- List of new ecclesiastical buildings by J. L. Pearson

== Bibliography ==
- Dale, Antony (1989). Brighton Churches. London: Routledge. ISBN 0-415-00863-8.
