= Crown House, St Leonards-on-Sea =

House in the United Kingdom

Crown House
- West Villa; Victoria House
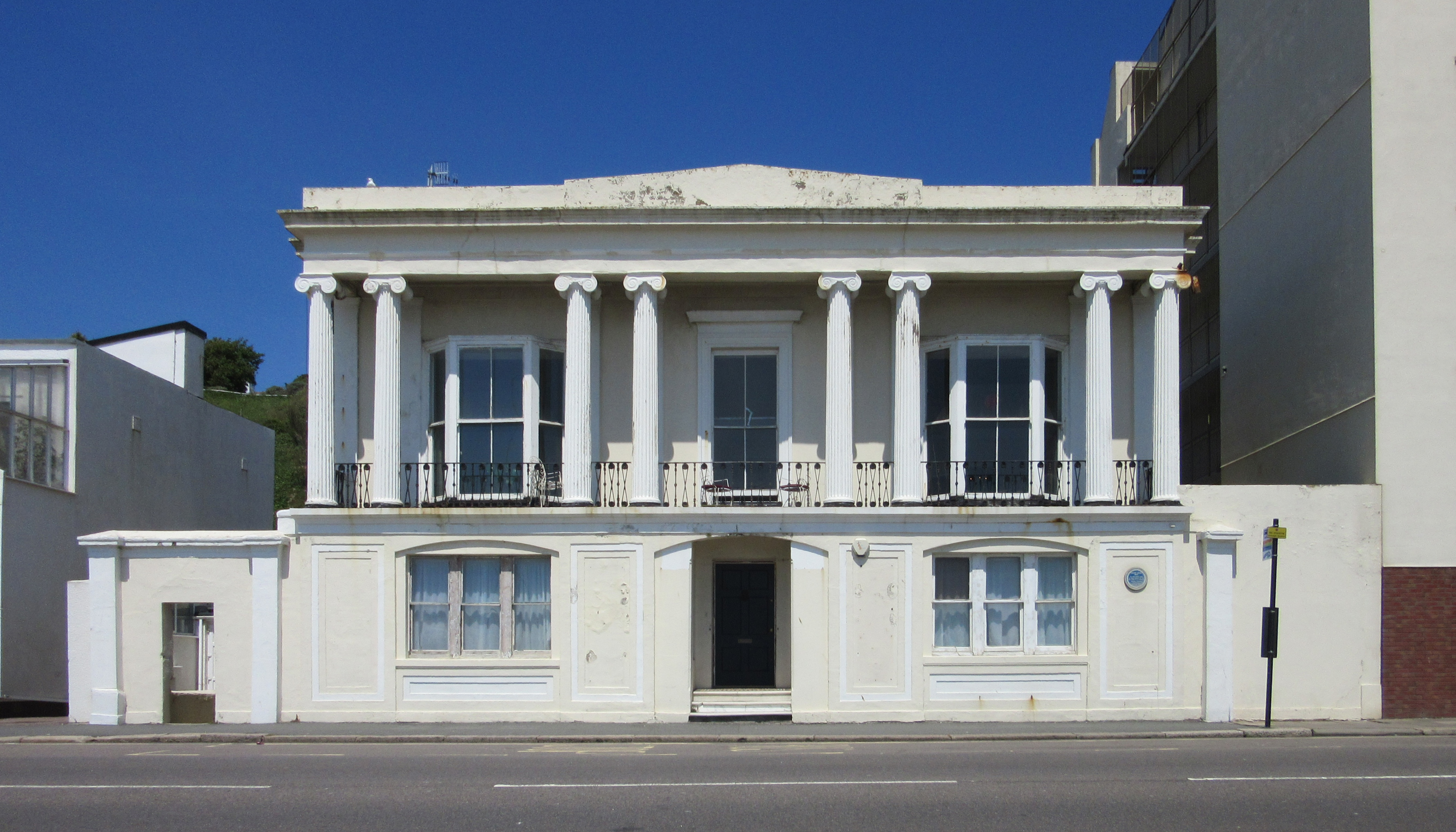
- Crown House pictured in June 2015

- Location of Crown House in East Sussex
- 50.8509°N 0.5525°E
- Location: 57 Marina, St Leonards-on-Sea, East Sussex TN38 0BE

History
- Founder: James Burton
- Built: 1828
- Original use: Private house for James Burton

Site notes
- Architect: James Burton
- Architectural style: Classical
- Restored: 1951–52
- Current use: Private house

Listed Building – Grade II*
- Official name: Crown House, 57 Marina, St Leonards-on-Sea
- Designated: 19 January 1951
- Reference no.: 1043436

Crown House (formerly known as West Villa and Victoria House) is a residential building on the seafront of St Leonards-on-Sea, a 19th-century planned seaside resort on the coast of East Sussex, England. It was the first building completed in the town, which was planned and laid out by architect and property developer James Burton, and he used it as his own house. Intended as "a high-class watering place by the sea, along the best lines [and] for the best people", St Leonards-on-Sea was overshadowed by its larger neighbour Hastings and was merged into that town before the end of the 19th century, but Burton's venture was initially successful—particularly after a Royal visit in 1834–35 when the Duchess of Kent and the future Queen Victoria stayed at Crown House throughout the winter.

The house, an "elegant" three-bay villa in the Classical style, survived wartime damage and the threat of demolition, and was restored in 1951–52. It spent about 60 years in commercial use before reverting to residential use c. 2013. It is listed as Grade II* for its architectural and historical importance, and lies within one of Hastings Borough Council's designated conservation areas.

== History ==
James Burton was one of the most successful builders and property developers of the late 18th and early 19th centuries: he built extensively in the Bloomsbury and Regent's Park areas of London and worked alongside John Nash, "play[ing] a vital part in the major London building projects" of the prominent Regency architect. By the 1820s he was in his 60s and very rich, but rather than retiring from property development he decided to undertake a major speculative project on the East Sussex coast west of the ancient town of Hastings. Although it is not known for certain why he chose this location, Hastings had grown rapidly in popularity in the early 19th century—prompted in part by the beauty of its undeveloped surroundings—and Burton is known to have visited the area in 1815, the year in which an influential guidebook to "watering-places" was republished.

Land belonging to the former manor of Gensing, between Hastings and the former Cinque Port of Bulverhythe, became available in 1827, and Burton purchased a large site from the Eversfield baronets. The transaction was completed on 27 February 1828 at a cost of £7,800. The site included a steep, wooded valley and a flat sea-facing swathe of fields; it lay across the boundary of St Leonard's and St Mary Magdalene's parishes. The former was named after one of Hastings' ancient parish churches which disappeared several centuries previously, while the medieval Hospital of St Mary Magdalene gave its name to the latter, first described in the mid-17th century.

Work began on the new town in early 1828, when proposals for a crescent of "commodious residences for large respectable families" were announced, as well as a new road which would reduce the length of the journey from London to the coast by 2 miles (3.2 km). By April 1828, though, work on Burton's own house had taken precedence after plans for the seafront crescent were altered. The timber-framed structure of the building was assembled in London, at Burton's own workshops; because of the poor condition of the roads locally, the completed framework and the other materials required to finish the building were transported by sea on a sloop to Hastings and were then conveyed to the site on horse-drawn wagons. The building contractor was "Yorky" Smith, who had built several Martello towers on the East Sussex coast before moving to Hastings and "play[ing] an important part in the physical development" of the area.

Burton's son Decimus Burton, who had opposed his father's elaborate plans for the new town and was concerned that he had overspent—potentially bringing ruin upon the family—decided that "a royal visit would give the town the push it needed" to thrive. In August 1834 the Duchess of Kent Princess Victoria of Saxe-Coburg-Saalfeld and her then teenage daughter Princess Victoria were in Royal Tunbridge Wells to lay the foundation stone of a new school designed by Decimus Burton. At the ceremony he described "the delights of his father's new town" and encouraged them to spend the winter in St Leonards-on-Sea; and James Burton followed this up with an invitation for them to stay at Crown House.

They arrived on 4 November 1834 to much public acclaim, with a triumphal arch, 21-gun salute, public addresses, banquets and other festivities. The visit, which was "an outstanding success", concluded on 29 January 1835 when the princesses returned to London. "Such royal patronage was exactly what Burton had hoped for, as it assured the success of his new town as a fashionable watering place on the coast." Burton renamed the building Victoria House after this visit, but the name was changed back to Crown House after Victoria became Queen in 1837. Burton died in March of that year and was buried at the nearby St Leonard's Church.

The building was damaged during World War II in a bombing raid which also destroyed the neighbouring hotel. Demolition was proposed in 1950 because of its poor condition: Hastings Borough Council voted against it being statutorily listed, describing it as "a redundant building with an out-of-date design" and "fake Greek architecture".

Despite this, it was listed the following year by the Ministry of Works, the government department responsible for heritage assets at that time. By 1952 Crown House had been restored and ownership passed to the National Assistance Board, which was based there until the mid-1960s. It was then converted into the Tudor Rose Social Club, and from 2002 it was used as a pub with the name Crown House. The premises included a function room and a restaurant. This closed by 2013 and residential conversion followed.

== Architecture and heritage ==
Crown House was listed as Grade II* on 19 January 1951. This defines it as a "particularly important" building of "more than special interest". As of February 2001, it was one of 13 Grade II* listed buildings, and 535 listed buildings of all grades, in the borough of Hastings.

The building is part of the St Leonards West Conservation Area, one of 18 conservation areas in the borough of Hastings.

The central seafront of St Leonards-on-Sea is dominated by tall Regency-style terraces built between the early 1830s and the mid-1850s, all designed by James Burton. Crown House forms an "atypical break in the overall composition" through its shorter height and "architectural expressiveness". "Much smaller and more elegant" than the adjacent terraces and the "crass" postwar block immediately to its west, it is a Classical-style building of two storeys with a symmetrical three-bay façade. The walls are of painted stucco; the ground floor has a series of recessed painted panels flanking the windows, which are also set in recessed panels with segmental-headed arches. The central entrance door is also set back. At first-floor level, fluted Ionic columns rise to support an entablature and cornice whose parapet has a shallow pediment in the middle. There are three windows: a tall sash in the centre, flanked by pilasters, and pilastered bay windows to each side. A "delicate wrought iron railing" runs across the width of the first floor.

== See also ==
- Grade II* listed buildings in Hastings
