= Pelham Arcade =

Shopping arcade in Hastings, England

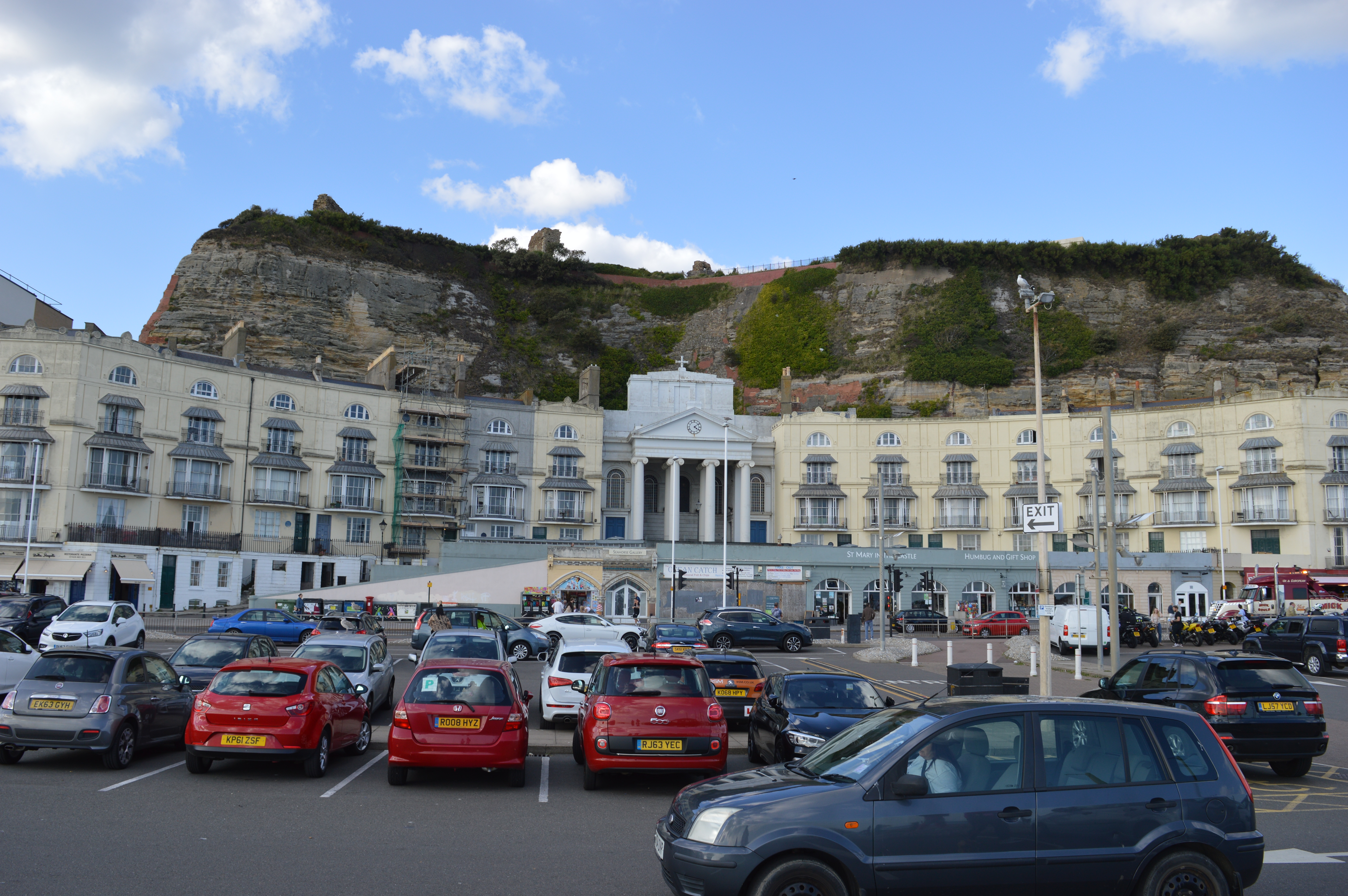
- Pelham Crescent in 2019
- Interactive map of the Pelham Arcade area

General information
- Status: Completed
- Type: Shopping arcade
- Classification: Grade II*
- Location: Hastings, East Sussex, England, 1–12 Pelham Crescent, Hastings, United Kingdom
- Coordinates: 50°51′20″N 00°35′05″E
- Construction started: 1823
- Renovated: 2010–2014

Design and construction
- Architect: Joseph Kay

Pelham Arcade is a shopping arcade in Hastings, East Sussex, England. Completed in 1825, the arcade has around 30 shops. It was renovated between 2010 and 2014, after being on the Heritage at Risk Register. The arcade is a Grade II* listed building.

== History ==
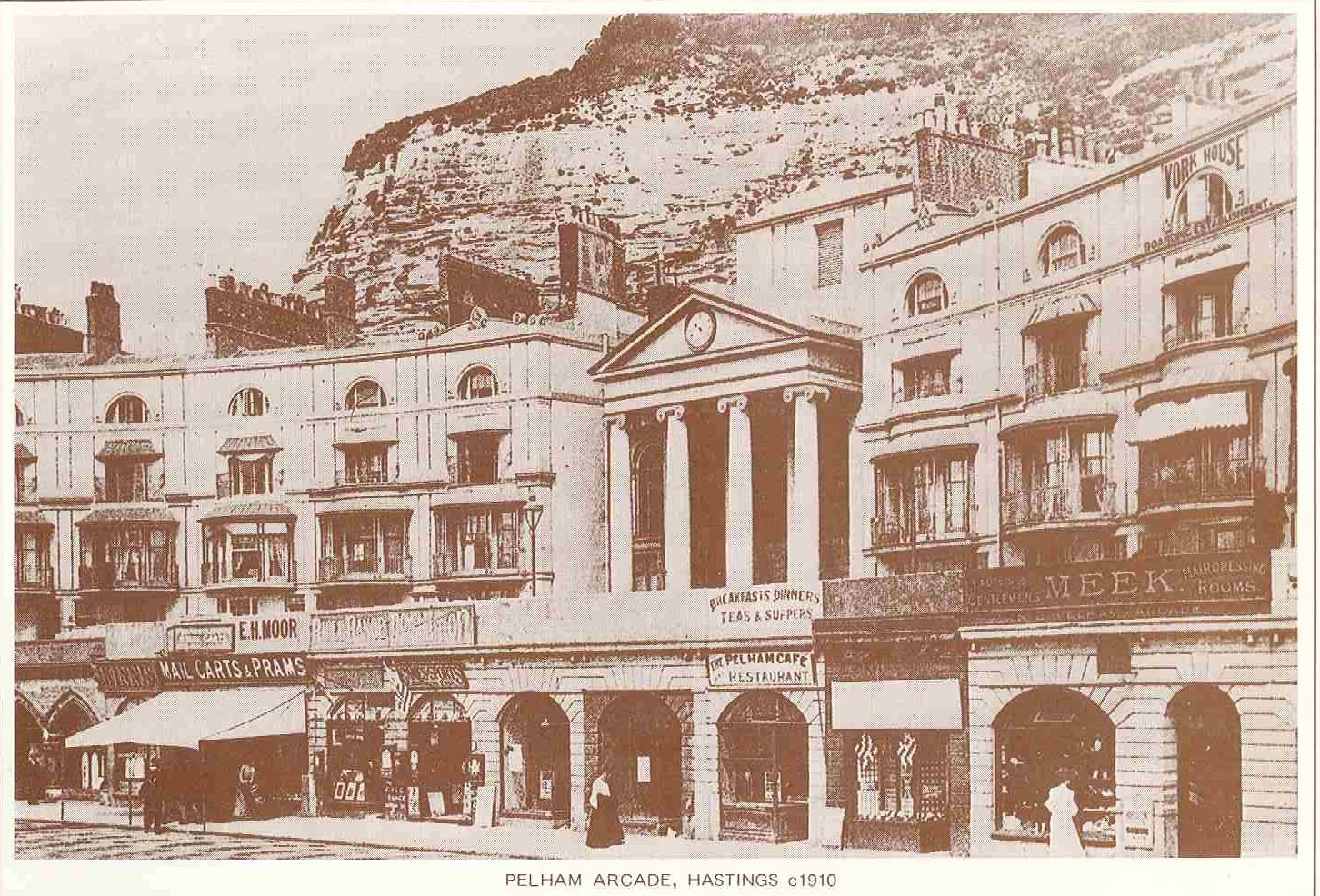
Pelham Arcade in 1910

Pelham Arcade was built between 1823 and 1825 by Joseph Kay, at 1–12 Pelham Crescent in Hastings, East Sussex. It is believed to be one of the UK's oldest shopping arcades. Pelham Arcade was intended to mimic the style of Burlington Arcade in London, in particular, the use of arches between shops. Pelham Arcade and Pelham Crescent are named after Thomas Pelham, 2nd Earl of Chichester, who built terraced houses in the area in the early 19th century, and owned Hastings Castle.

In the nineteenth century, the arcade contained around 30 shops, including coffee shops, cigar shops, a library, French china shops, jewellery shops and shops selling foreign wines. The arcade also contained assembly rooms, and had evening performances for one shilling. In the summer, musical shows were performed on the promenade outside the arcade. In 1857, a Russian gun captured during the Crimean War was displayed on the seafront near Pelham Arcade. In the 1930s, the gun was moved to the Hastings Museum and Art Gallery.

In the 20th and early 21st century, Pelham Arcade became run down, and suffered from damp and structural problems. In 1988, it became a Grade II listed building. Pelham Arcade was also listed on the Heritage at Risk Register. In 2011, the arcade was upgraded from Grade II to Grade II* listed building status. Between 2010 and 2014, Pelham Arcade was renovated, with new shop fronts and arches in the original style, and fixes to the roof in order to stop it from leaking. In 2014, the arcade was removed from the Heritage at Risk Register, to represent the fact that the arcade was no longer in decline.
