= Sarah Waldegrave, Countess Waldegrave =

British countess

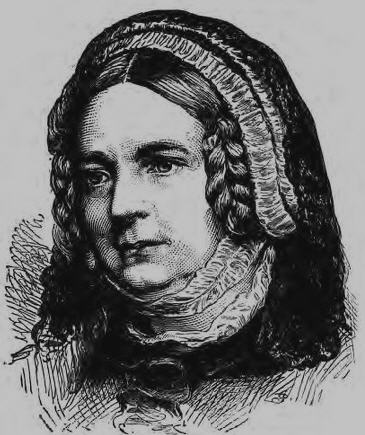

Sarah Waldegrave, Countess Waldegrave (17 January 1787 – 18 April 1873) was a British philanthropist.

Sarah Whitear was born in 1787, the daughter of Rev. William Whitear, a prebendary of Chichester, at Hastings Old Town Rectory. She firstly married Edward Milward, who later served as Mayor of Hastings several times and she inherited considerable wealth on his death. On 8 December 1846, aged 59, she married widower William Waldegrave, 8th Earl Waldegrave, who had inherited the title in September of that year.

The countess used her position and wealth to help the poor of Hastings and also endowed seven churches in the town as well as many Sunday schools, poor schools, wash houses, public baths and a Fisherman's Institute.

Lady Waldegrave persuaded people to do things her way, especially as she attached strict conditions to her donations, such as separate entrances for boys and girls in the schools she founded and prohibition of alcohol in public areas she designed. In 1861, money was collected from the town's children to erect a drinking fountain in her honour, but it fell out of use within a few years.
