= Winkle Island (Hastings) =

Traffic island in Hastings, East Sussex, England

Coordinates: 50.85629°N 0.59243°E

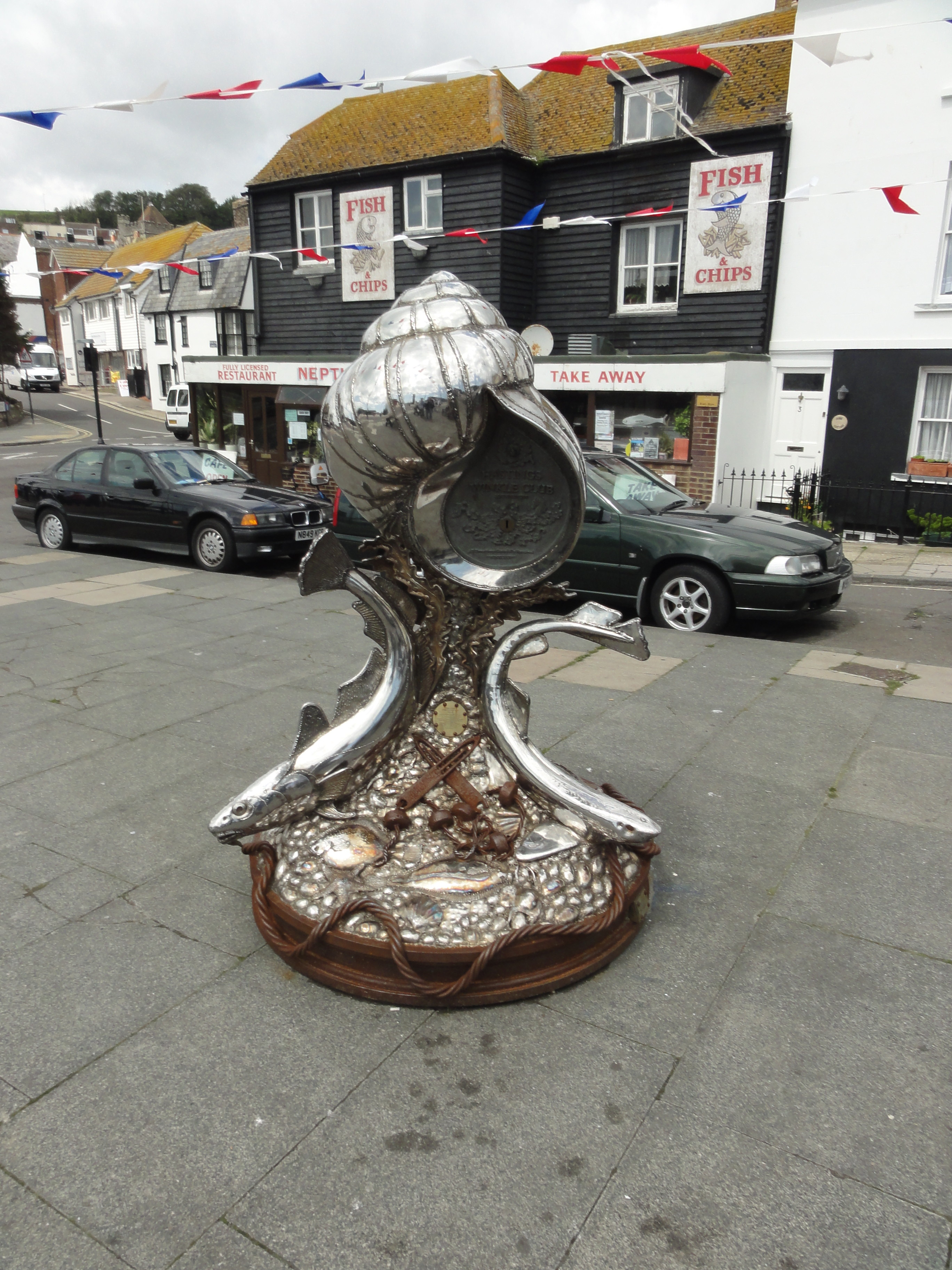
The sculpture on Winkle Island

Winkle Island is a traffic island at the heart of Hastings Old Town in East Sussex, England, in the United Kingdom. It is part of a unique area in Hastings called 'The Stade' (the old Saxon term for 'landing place') and the stretch of shingle beach from which Hastings' famous fishing fleet has been launched every day for over a thousand years.

Winkle Island is located at the foot of All Saints Street at its junction with Rock-A-Nore Road at Hastings seafront. The small island is part of many outdoor events and festivals, such as the Hastings Old Town Week, and Jack In The Green. It is also the symbolic gathering place of the Winkle Club charity, as well as other local artistic events and street performances. A sculpture of a giant winkle, a marine gastropod, stands on the pavement. It was made by a member and given to the club by J. B. Jones. It is used as a collecting box for charity purposes.

== Gallery ==
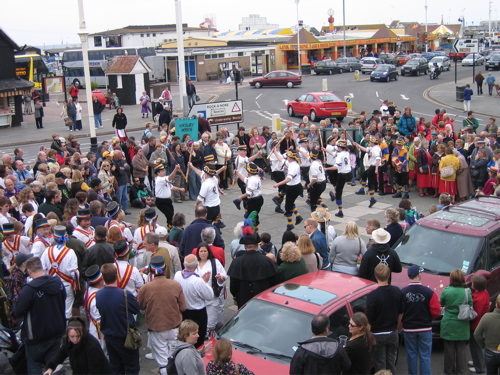
Dancing on Winkle Island

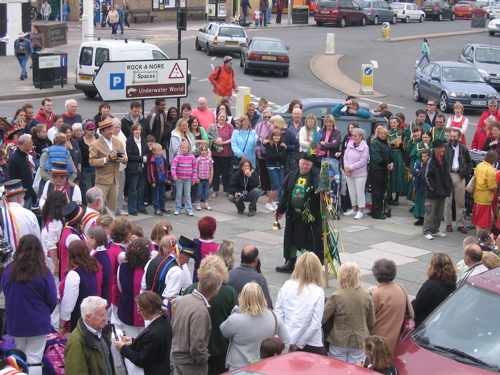
Town crier

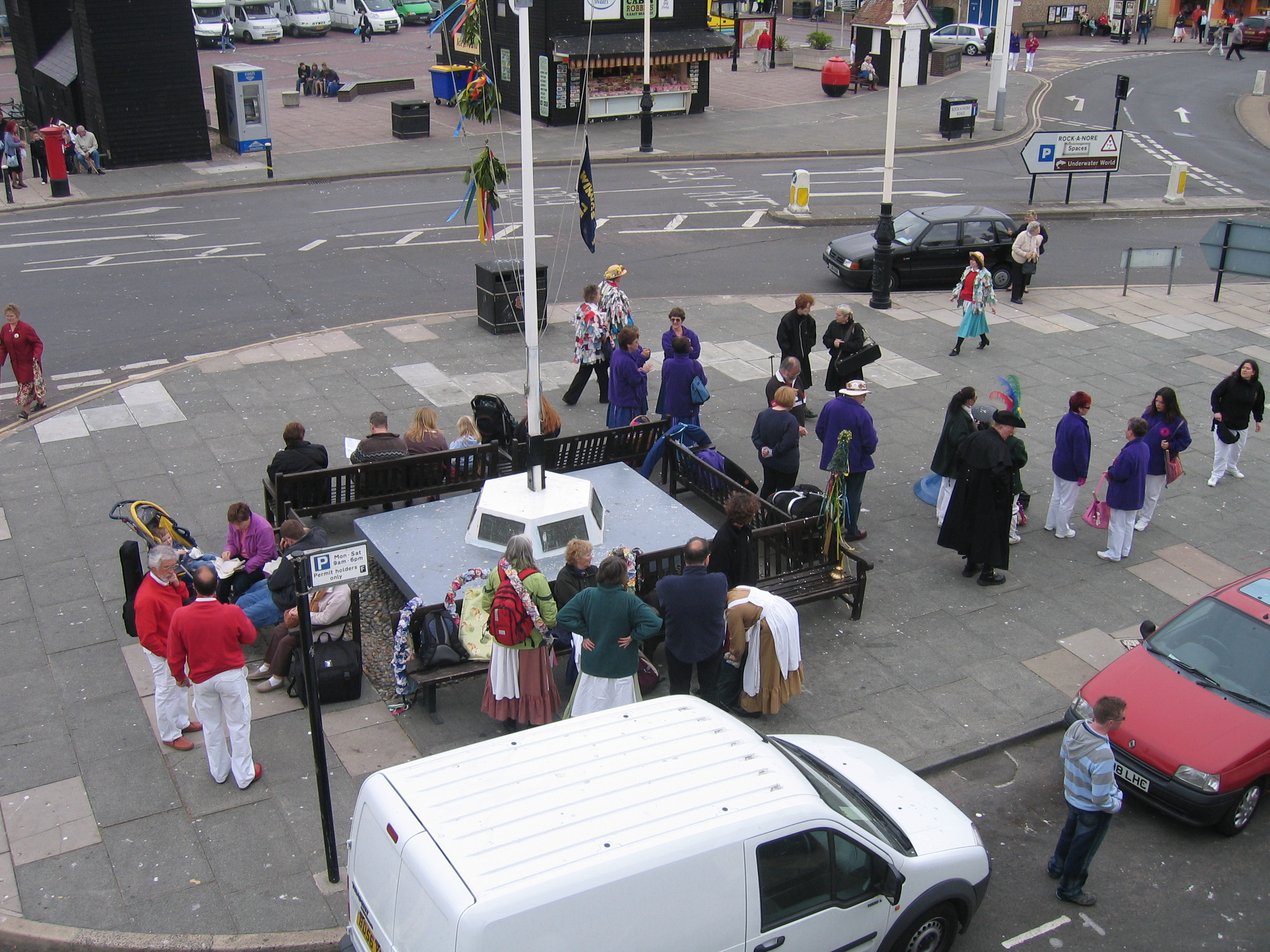
View of Winkle Island
