= Ebenezer Particular Baptist Chapel, Hastings =

Ebenezer Particular Baptist Chapel
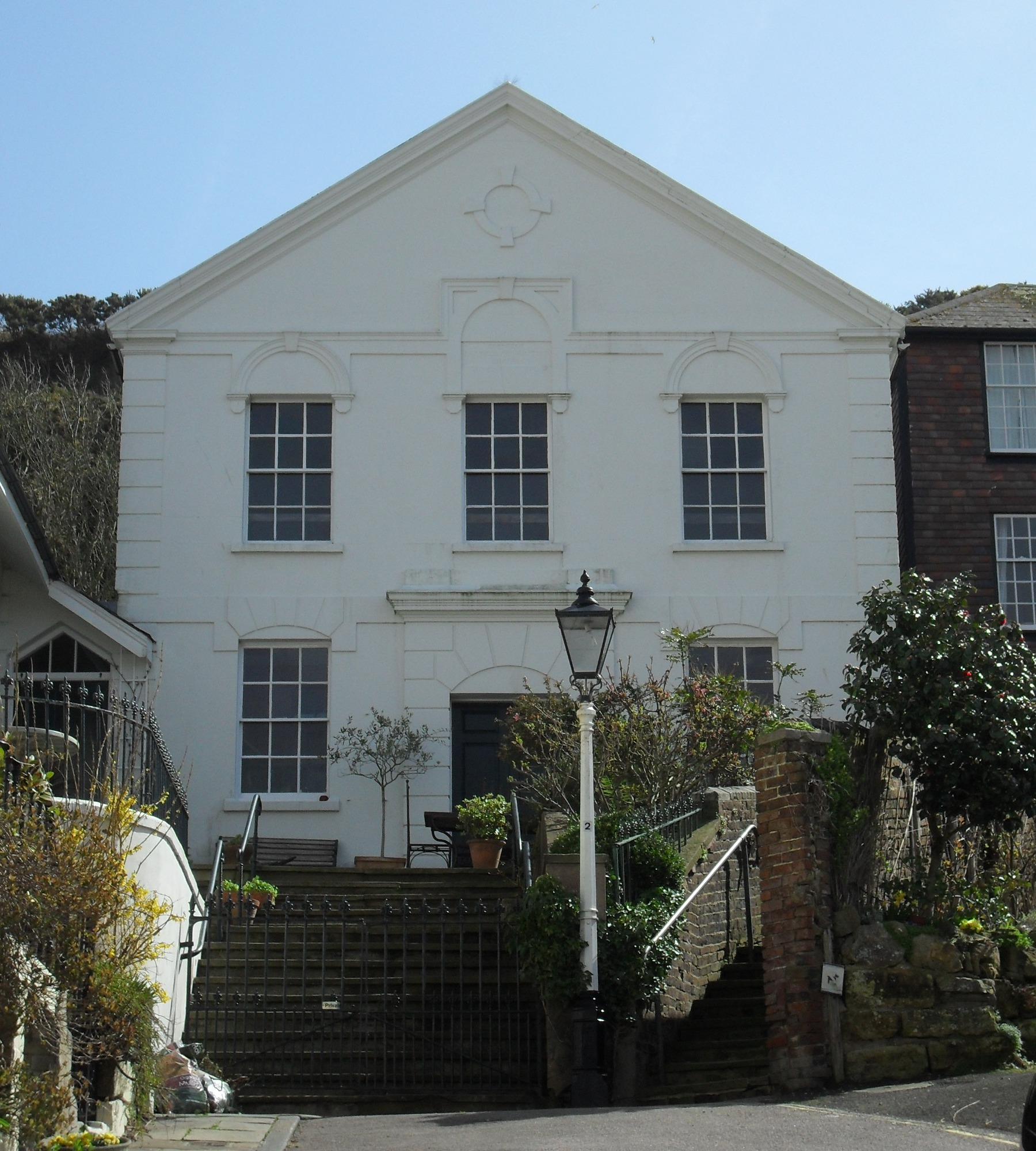
- The chapel from the northwest
- Ebenezer Particular Baptist Chapel
- 50.8585°N 0.5961°E
- Location: Ebenezer Road, Old Town, Hastings, East Sussex TN34 3BS
- Country: England
- Denomination: Baptist

History
- Status: Former chapel
- Founded: 1817
- Founder: David Fenner

Architecture
- Functional status: Residential conversion
- Heritage designation: Grade II
- Designated: 19 January 1951
- Style: Neoclassical
- Completed: 1817
- Closed: c. 1999

Ebenezer Particular Baptist Chapel is a former Strict Baptist place of worship in Hastings, East Sussex, England. Founded in 1817 by members of the congregation of an older Baptist chapel in the ancient town, it was extended several times in the 19th century as attendances grew during Hastings' period of rapid growth as a seaside resort. It was closed and converted into a house in the late 20th century, but still stands in a prominent position in Hastings Old Town. English Heritage has listed the building at Grade II for its architectural and historical importance.

== History ==
Hastings is one of the oldest settlements in Sussex. Its position—a sheltered natural harbour near fertile fishing grounds in the English Channel, surrounded by forests and marshes—allowed an autonomous settlement to develop from about the 8th century. The Haestingas tribe, finally overcome by King Offa of Mercia in 771, gave its name to the settlement in which they were based. The town was large and important enough to have a mint by 928; and a century later its most famous event, the Battle of Hastings, brought it to wider attention.

Several churches were founded in the medieval era: there were seven in 1291. Over the centuries, most were closed and demolished. The two oldest survivors, St Clement's Church (rebuilt after being damaged by French raiders in 1377) and All Saints Church (about 1410), lie either side of the parallel streets which formed the heart of the Old Town. In 1801, these were still the only two churches in the Old Town; but in about 1809, Protestant Nonconformism—prevalent throughout Sussex since the 17th century— made its first appearance in the form of a small chapel on Tackleway, behind the beach at Rock-a-Nore. Cow Lodge Chapel was built for Strict Baptists and was attended by a David Fenner. A disagreement among the congregation led to the secession of some members in 1817. Fenner was one of the secessionists, and in that year he built a new chapel on a steeply sloping site behind Tackleway.

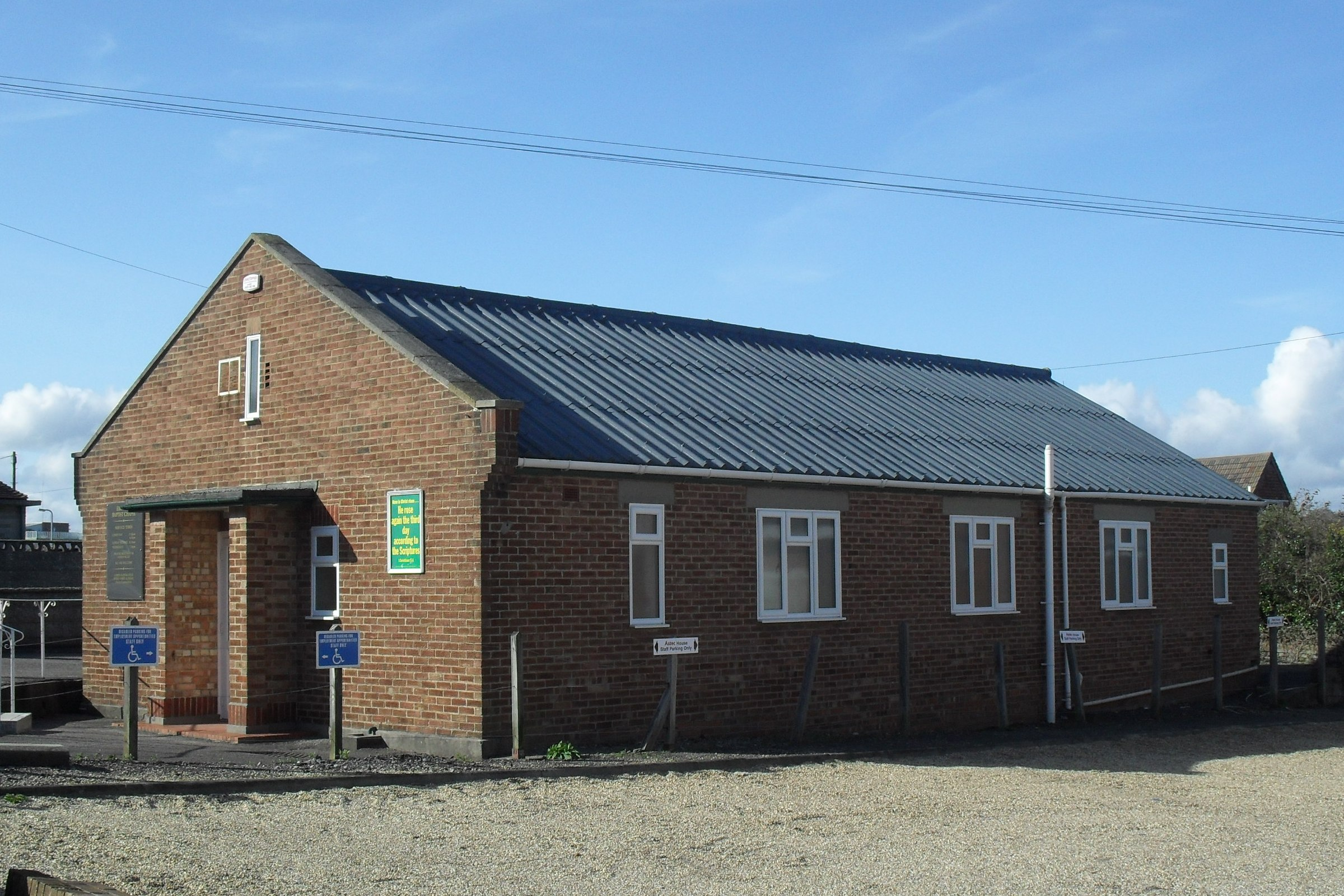
Ebenezer Baptist Chapel now occupies this building in the Silverhill area of Hastings.

Later, the road on which the chapel stood took the name Ebenezer from the chapel. The congregation grew throughout the 19th century as Hastings developed into a popular seaside resort. The religious census of Sussex in 1851 recorded that the chapel had 280 sittings, 135 of which were free; and attendances at the morning and afternoon services were given as 200 and 210 respectively. The minister David Fermer stated on the census return that "the number of persons who attend Ebenezer Church amount to about 300, but seldom all meet at one service".

Extensions and alterations were made in 1872, 1882 and 1886, and the pedimented façade was added around that time as well. In contrast, attendances declined in the late 20th century, and in common with many other Baptist chapels in Sussex (at, for example, Burgess Hill, Newick, Hadlow Down, Bolney, Southover, Pell Green Rye and Shover's Green), it has been sold and converted into a house. The building's marriage registration was cancelled in October 1999. The cause survives, though: a former Plymouth Brethren meeting room in the Silverhill suburb of Hastings was acquired and is now a Gospel Standard Strict Baptist chapel, again named Ebenezer.

Ebenezer Particular Baptist Chapel was listed at Grade II by English Heritage on 19 January 1951; this defines it as a "nationally important" building of "special interest". As of February 2001, it was one of 521 Grade II listed buildings, and 535 listed buildings of all grades, in the borough of Hastings.

== Architecture ==
The chapel is Neoclassical in style and has a rendered exterior which has now been painted over. The walls underneath are brick. The two-storey building has three bays, each with a sash window (described by Ian Nairn and Nikolaus Pevsner as "oddly debased"). A wide string course divides the upper and lower floors. The entrance porch is flanked by pilasters and has a cornice and parapet with a tympanum. Below the roofline, a set of three sash windows are topped with slightly recessed arches which extend above the level of the cornice; the centre arch is higher. Above these is a pediment with a circular recess surrounded by four keystones. At the rear (facing Tackleway), some of the original red-brick wall remains, although it has been altered. There are some yellow brick dressings, three arched windows and another pediment.

== See also ==
- List of places of worship in Hastings

== Bibliography ==
- Anon. (1975). Hastings & St Leonards Official Guide 1975. Hastings: Hastings Borough Council Tourism and Recreation Department.
- Elleray, D. Robert (1979). Hastings: a Pictorial History. Chichester: Phillimore & Co. ISBN 0-85033-324-5.
- Elleray, D. Robert (2004). Sussex Places of Worship. Worthing: Optimus Books. ISBN 0-9533132-7-1.
- Nairn, Ian; Pevsner, Nikolaus (1965). The Buildings of England: Sussex. Harmondsworth: Penguin Books. ISBN 0-14-071028-0.
- Stell, Christopher (2002). Nonconformist Chapels and Meeting-houses in Eastern England. Swindon: English Heritage. ISBN 1-873592-50-7.
- Vickers, John A., ed. (1989). The Religious Census of Sussex 1851. Lewes: Sussex Record Society. ISBN 085445-036-X.
