= Hastings Old Town Week =

Annual festival in Hastings, England

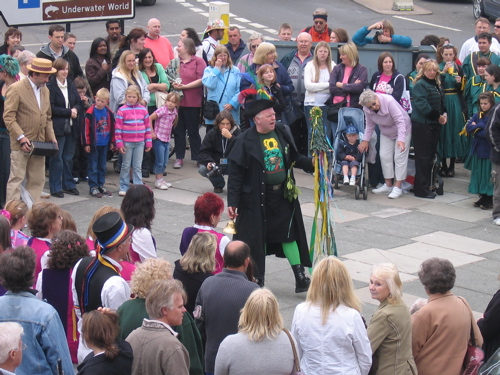
The opening ceremony on Winkle Island

Hastings Old Town Week is an annual summer event celebrated in the Old Town of Hastings, East Sussex. The Old Town week typically occurs during the first week of August and is officially opened on Winkle Island. During the week events such as concerts, street parties, charity races and Morris Dancing take place. The week ends with the Old Town Carnival procession, which contains 'floats', dancers, majorettes and marching bands and ends with a firework display in the evening.

The carnival was first started in 1969 after Old Town residents felt the original Hastings Carnival should have included the Old Town in its route and decided to set up their own carnival. The Old Town event gradually got more popular and bigger, whilst the Hastings event became less popular and eventually stopped. As a parting gift the Old Town organisers were allowed to title the Carnival Queen "Miss Hastings". In 2018, the Carnival Court was rebranded the Sea Court and expanded to include a King, who carries the title Mr Hastings.

== Events ==
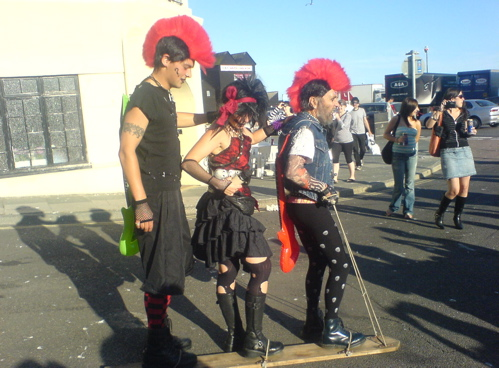
One of many activities during the Carnival Week

The Seaboot Race is a race in which each entrant has to run from the start/finish line around a lobster pot and back, wearing seaboots and a top hat.

The Bike Race is another race where the entrant has to ride up the steepest road in the Old Town, using a Butchers Bike in the quickest time possible, without taking their buttocks off the saddle. This event is undertaken in memory of a local fisherman who died during the Great Storm of 1987.

Other events include the pram race, Best Dressed Window Competition, the High Street party, various eating competitions, a Gurning championship and the concluding Carnival Procession.
