= 121 All Saints Street Hastings =

Listed building in East Sussex, England

121 All Saints Street, Hastings
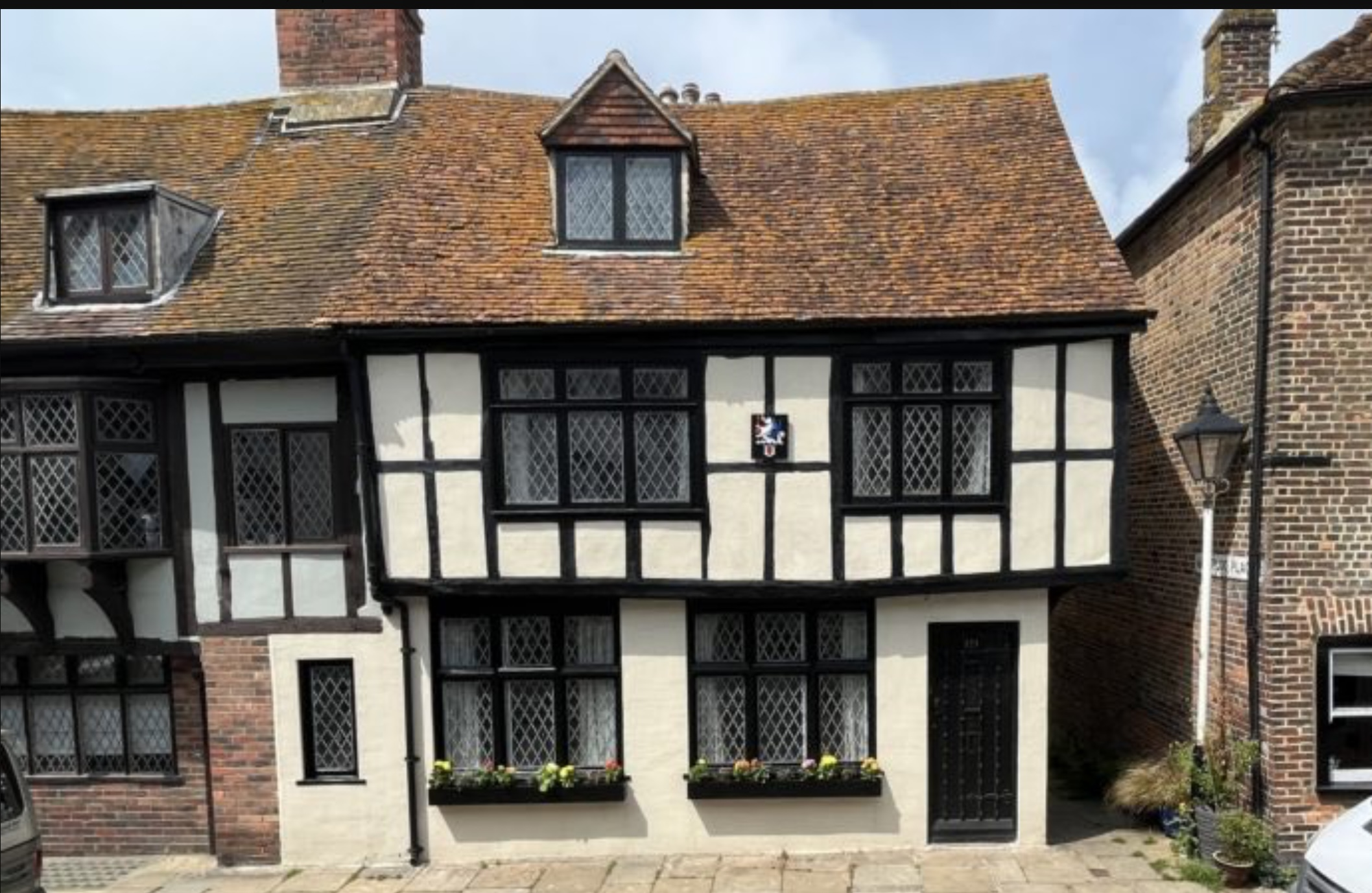
- 121 All Saints Street, Hastings
- Interactive map of the 121 All Saints Street, Hastings area

General information
- Architectural style: Vernacular architecture
- Location: All Saints Street, Old Town, Hastings, East Sussex, England
- Coordinates: 50.8583°N 0.5944°E
- Construction started: 1648

Listed Building – Grade II
- Designated: 19 January 1951
- Reference no.: 1190494

121 All Saints Street Hastings is a Grade II listed building in the Conservation Area of Hastings Old Town, East Sussex, England. It was built in 1648, is timber-frame, jettying to the front and side, and with a dragon beam, and bears the crest of Sir James Duke, 1st Baronet. It is one of the best preserved half-timbered houses in Hastings.

== History ==
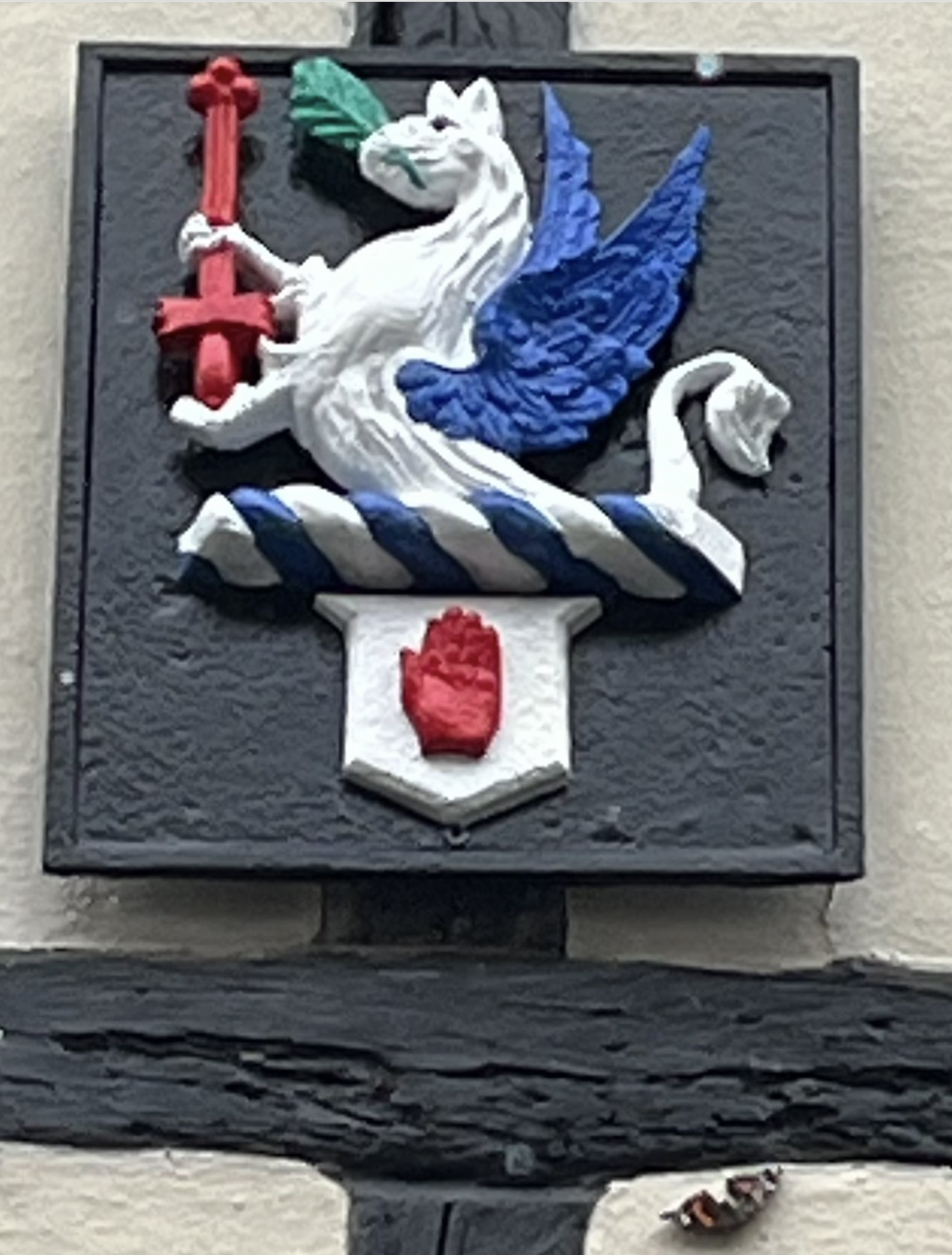
Crest of Sir James Duke, 1st baronet

The house was constructed in 1648 during the English Civil War, at a time when Hastings was garrisoned by the Parliamentarians. The oak timbers were cut to size at a saw pit, and reassembled on site, incorporating fragments of an earlier building. Carpenters’ marks are visible from this process. Panels were of wattle and daub, some of which survive in their original state. A brick chimney stack with fireplaces for the ground and first floors provides the house with structural support. The house is jettied to the front and side. Features include a dragon post and dragon beam, and bressumer beams with chamfer stop ends. The roof is supported by a queen post truss frame, and would originally have been thatched, though now has clay-peg tiles. It appears that the original timbers for the roof were inadequately dried, causing the purlins to deform, creating a clearly visible bow on the roof.

Work about 1750 included installing a brick paver cellar floor, which is extant. The house is associated with smuggling, particularly during the Napoleonic Wars. 1820 repairs utilised Baltic timber from Riga. For much of the nineteenth century it was a grocer's shop, for a time selling produce from farms owned by Sir James Duke, whose crest is displayed. It was also a registry office for births and deaths, and for a time a post office. An example of late Victorian concealed shoes was found hidden in the mortar of a cellar wall.

In the 1950s the house was scheduled for slum clearance but saved by the work of a local builder. It is now a key part of the historic environment of Old Town Hastings, part of Old Hastings Conservation Area. Conservation and historical investigation is being carried out by the present owner Graeme Davis.
