= Jack o' the Green =

Jack o' the Green may be:

- Jack o' the Green, Jack in the green, role in English-folk-culture traditions for May Day
- "Jack O The Green" (Jools Holland album)
- Jack o' the Green, character played by Tom Cruise in the film Legend
