= Rock-a-Nore =

Area of Hastings in East Sussex, England

Coordinates: 50.856°N 0.595°E

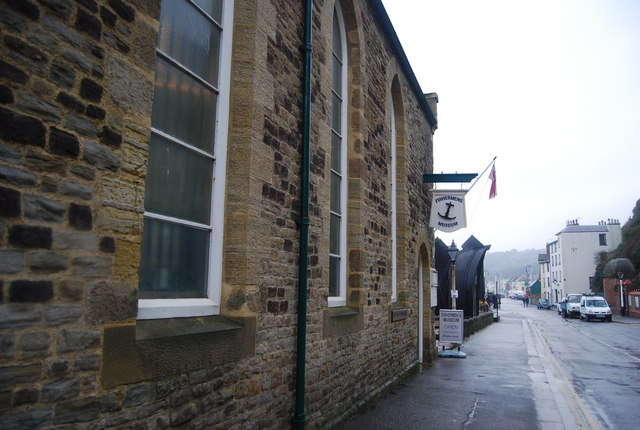
Rock-a-Nore

Rock-a-Nore is an urban area of Hastings, East Sussex, England, stretching from the Old Town area along Rock-a-Nore Road between the cliffs and the beach called The Stade. Its name was officially adopted in 1859 and derives from a former building "lyinge to the Mayne Rock against the north".

Rock-a-Nore contains the Blue Reef Aquarium, the Fishermen's Museum, the Shipwreck Museum and the East Hill Cliff Railway, and borders The Stade, with its tall black wooden "net shop" sheds, which were built to provide a weather proof store for the fishing gear. The sheds are tarred black and weatherboarded.

== See also ==
- West Hill Cliff Railway
