= Roy Judge =

British folklorist and historian

Roy Judge (1929–2000) was a British folklorist and historian.

== Early life and education ==
Judge was born in Hastings in 1929, where he attended the local grammar school before being evacuated to St Albans during the Second World War. He went on to St Catherine’s, Oxford, graduating with a degree in History in 1950. He gained a postgraduate certificate of education and in 1953 began teaching at Dovedale secondary modern school, Peckham, moving to Erith Grammar School to teach History and Religious Studies in 1958 and then on to Furzedown College of Education, as lecturer in Religious Studies, in 1963.

Judge was a keen Morris dancer, a member of both the Oxford University Morris Men and the London Pride side, for whom be became Squire (leader) of in 1966.

== Folklore studies ==
In 1974 Judge took a sabbatical to undertake a master’s degree at the Institute of Dialect and Folk Life Studies at the University of Leeds. His research focused on the Jack-in-the-Green, the perambulatory bush which was the traditional May-day custom of sweeps in the nineteenth century and was later published as The Jack-in-the-Green (1979, 2nd edn 1984). This work has been praised for bringing “sound historical method to folklore studies” and for making use of local sources - local newspapers and manuscript collections, printed ephemera, and school logbooks - that historians themselves were only just beginning to appreciate.

On the closure of Furzedown in 1980, Judge took early retirement and became a latter-day gentleman scholar. Returning to the University of Leeds, he submitted a doctoral dissertation, Changing attitudes to May Day, 1844–1914, in 1987, developing this research in a number of articles.

His later research concerned the history of the Morris dance, and of its revival in the late nineteenth century through the work of Cecil Sharp. Judge's work showed how Morris dancing had been present in nineteenth century theatre and pageantry in ways hitherto unknown to scholars.

Judge served as president of the Folklore Society from 1990 to 1993 and was award the Society’s Coote Lake Medal in 2000. He has been credited as doing "more than anyone else to demythologise the early days of the 20th-century folk revival and the origins of May Day folk customs".

== Selected works ==
- Judge, Roy (1979). Judge, Roy (1979). The Jack-in-the-green a may day custom. ISBN 978-0-85991-029-3. OCLC 613768442
- Judge, Roy (1986). "May Morning and Magdalen College, Oxford", Folklore, 97:1, 15-40, DOI: 10.1080/0015587X.1986.9716364
- Judge, Roy (1991). "May Day and Merrie England", Folklore, 102:2, 131-148, DOI: 10.1080/0015587X.1991.9715815
- Judge, Roy (1992). "The Morris in Lichfield", Folklore, 103:2, 131-159, DOI: 10.1080/0015587X.1992.9715839
- Judge, Roy (1993). "Merrie England and the Morris 1881–1910", Folklore, 104:1-2, 124-143, DOI: 10.1080/0015587X.1993.9715860
- Judge, Roy (1997). “'The Old English Morris Dance': Theatrical Morris 1801-1880.” Folk Music Journal, 7:3, 311–350. JSTOR, www.jstor.org/stable/4522584. Accessed 15 Mar. 2021.
- Judge, Roy (1999). "The “Country Dancers” in the Cambridge Comus of 1908", Folklore, 110:1-2, 25-38, DOI: 10.1080/0015587X.1999.9715978
