= Winkle Club =

Charity in East Sussex, England

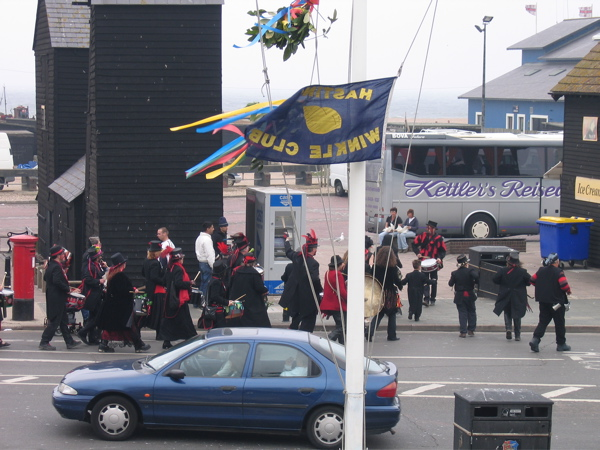
The Winkle Club's flag on Winkle Island

The Winkle Club is a charitable organisation formed in 1900 by Hastings fishermen to help the under-privileged families of Hastings Old Town, in East Sussex, in the south of England.

The Winkle Club headquarters, located at the Fishermen's Institute, opened in 1882. The building was given in trust for the use of Hastings fishermen; the ground floor area, now used as the bar and clubroom, was initially used by the fishermen for making and repairing their nets.

In addition to local residents, Winkle Club members have included Sir Winston Churchill, Lord Montgomery, Sir Norman Wisdom, Queen Elizabeth the Queen Mother, Admiral Lord Boyce, and former local MP Michael Foster.

Each Winkle Club member (or 'Winkler') carries a winkle shell which they must produce when challenged to 'winkle up'. Failure to do so results in a fine which goes towards local charities.

On special occasions, members of the Winkle Club gather on Winkle Island, at the foot of All Saints' Street, the venue for many of the club's outdoor events. The giant winkle that stands on the pavement (see photo), was used as a collecting box in the past.

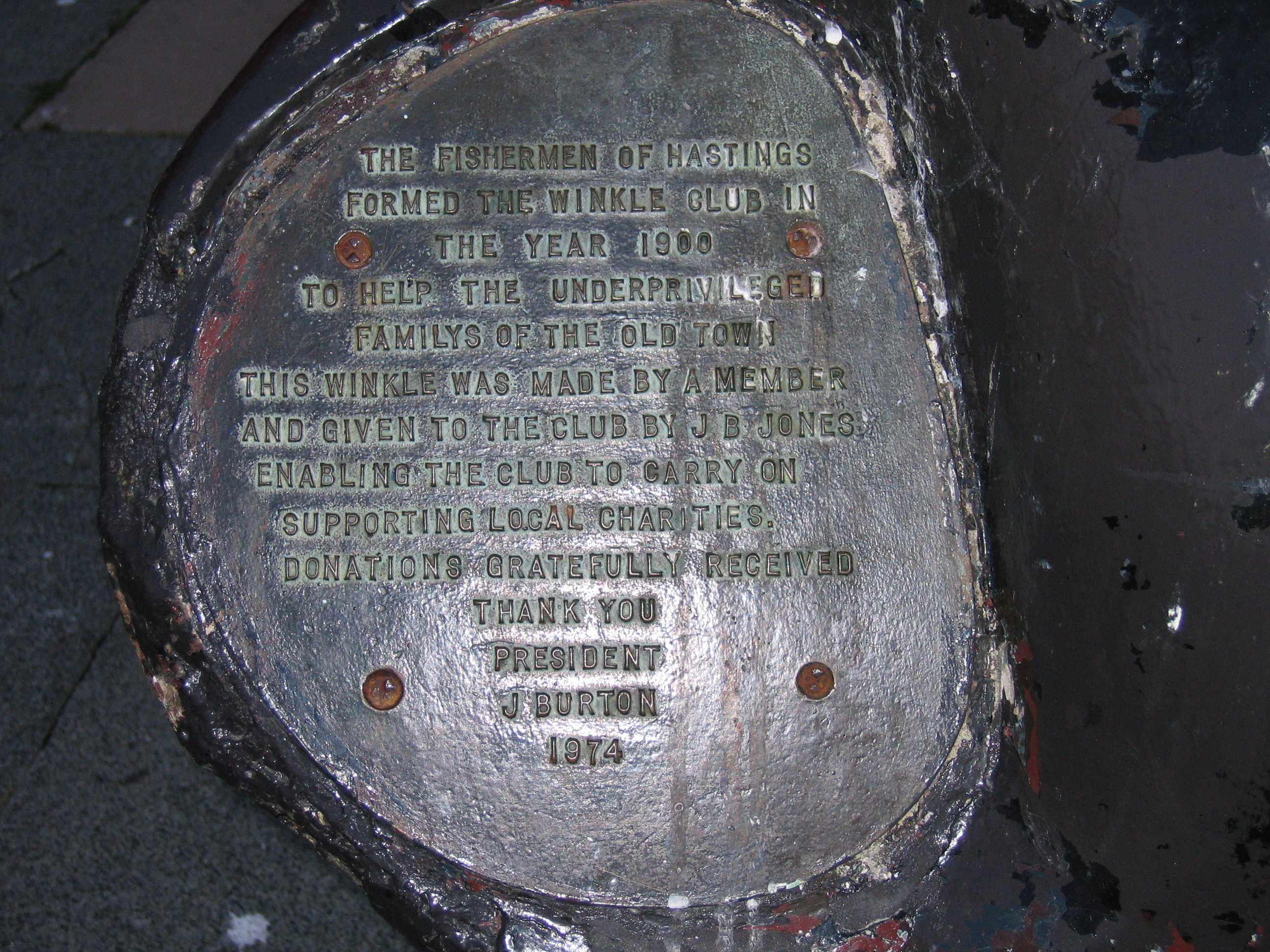
The Winkle's inscription - by Hastings fishermen

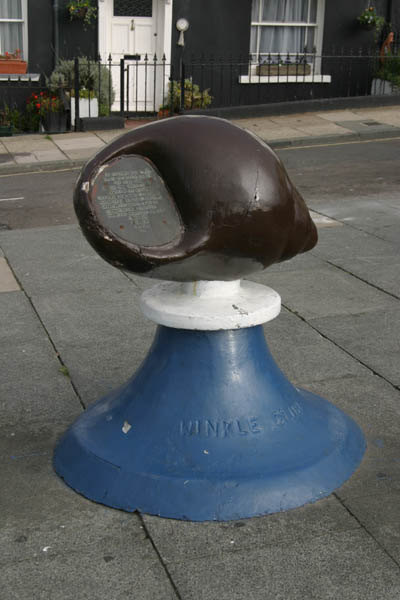
The giant winkle - on Winkle Island
