= May Day Run =

Annual motorcycling event in England

The Mayday Run is an annual motorcycling event in England that takes place on the first bank holiday Monday in May.

The event involves thousands of motorbikes taking a 55-mile (89 km) trip on the A21 road from Locksbottom to Hastings seafront, coinciding with the Jack-in-the-Green festival on that day. The event has been taking place for over 41 years now and has grown in interest from around the country commercially and publicly.

The first run took place in 1979 and the event has continued every year since.

The event is not an organized as such, only the police manage the traffic, and volunteers manage the parking. Hastings fills up with tourists and bikes by about 11 AM, and the A21 road from London serving Kent and the South coast is the used road which, as a result of the trip, is severely congested during the event.
