= Graeme Davis (mediaevalist) =

British historian

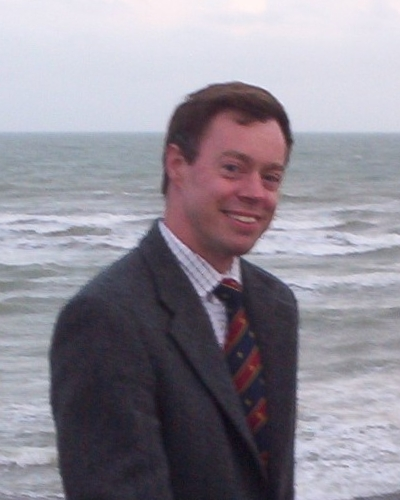
Graeme Davis

Graeme John Davis (born Dartford, 16 July 1965) is a British author, editor and academic researcher. He is an Honorary Reader in the School of English at the University of St Andrews. He is a specialist in mediaeval language and literature, with interests including the Anglo-Saxons, Vikings, Iceland, Greenland and the North Atlantic. Publications include Germanic linguistics and dialectology, mediaeval history of the North Atlantic Region, English literature criticism, and genealogy. Davis received a PhD from the University of St Andrews, and has taught at Manchester Metropolitan University, the University of Northumbria and Open University. Much of his work while at Manchester Metropolitan University was on EU TEMPUS projects with University of West Bohemia (Czech Republic) and Udmurt State University (Russia).

He and Karl Bernhardt are the editors of the linguistics monograph series Contemporary Studies in Descriptive Linguistics and Studies in Historical Linguistics. With Karl Bernhardt he is editor of The Buckingham Journal of Language and Linguistics and previously editor of three refereed on-line journals on linguistics, language and literature issued between 2002 and 2006. The journals were Journal of Language and Learning, Journal of Language and Linguistics and Journal of Language and Literature.

== Selected publications ==
- Comparative Syntax of Old English and Old Icelandic: Linguistic, Literary and Historical Implications. Oxford: Peter Lang, 2006.
- Dictionary of Surrey English: A Revised Edition of Granville Leveson Gower's 1893 A Glossary of Surrey Words. Oxford: Peter Lang, 2007.
- Stonehenge: A Landscape Through Time. Edited by David Jacques and Graeme Davis. Oxford: Peter Lang, 2019.
- Vikings in North America. Edinburgh: John Donald, 2026.
