= Hastings Fishermen's Museum =

Hastings Fishermen's Museum (Formerly St Nicholas' Church)
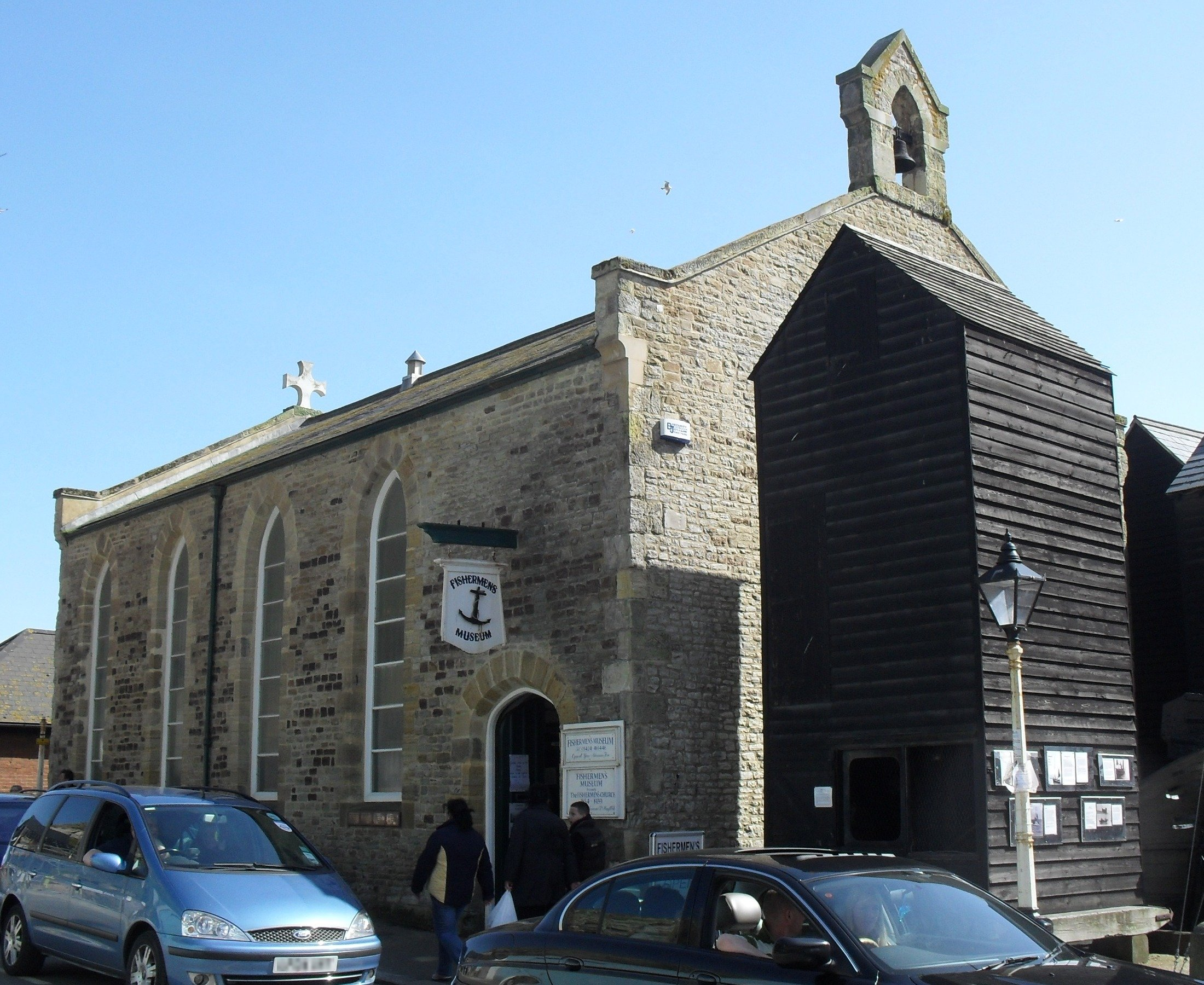
- The building from the northwest

- Location within East Sussex
- 50.8561°N 0.5952°E
- Location: Rock-a-Nore Road, Rock-a-Nore, Hastings, East Sussex TN34 3DW

History
- Founded: 1854
- Built: 1854
- Built for: Church of England (as St Nicholas' Church)

Site notes
- Architect: William J. Gant
- Architectural style: Gothic Revival
- Restored: 1956
- Restored by: Old Hastings Preservation Society
- Visitors: 140,000 (in 2008)

Listed Building – Grade II
- Official name: Fishermen's Museum
- Designated: 14 September 1976
- Reference no.: 1043428

Hastings Fishermen's Museum is a museum dedicated to the fishing industry and maritime history of Hastings, a seaside town in East Sussex, England. It is housed in a former church, officially known as St Nicholas' Church and locally as The Fishermen's Church, which served the town's fishing community for nearly 100 years from 1854. After wartime damage, occupation by the military and subsequent disuse, the building (an unconsecrated mission chapel) was leased from the local council by a preservation society, which modified it and established a museum in it. It opened in 1956 and is now one of the most popular tourist attractions in the town and borough of Hastings. The building, a simple Gothic Revival-style stone chapel, has been listed at Grade II by English Heritage for its architectural and historical importance.

== History of the church ==
From its founding in Saxon times, Hastings has been a fishing town; fishermen have worked on The Stade at Rock-a-Nore, near the Old Town, throughout the town's history, during times of prosperity (particularly the Middle Ages, when the industry was at its height), change (such as the 19th century, when the town was transformed into a holiday resort) and stagnation. Until the Victorian era, when the area's good climate and seaside location were exploited for tourism, Hastings' fortunes were dependent on the success or failure of the fishing port's activities and the associated boatbuilding industry.

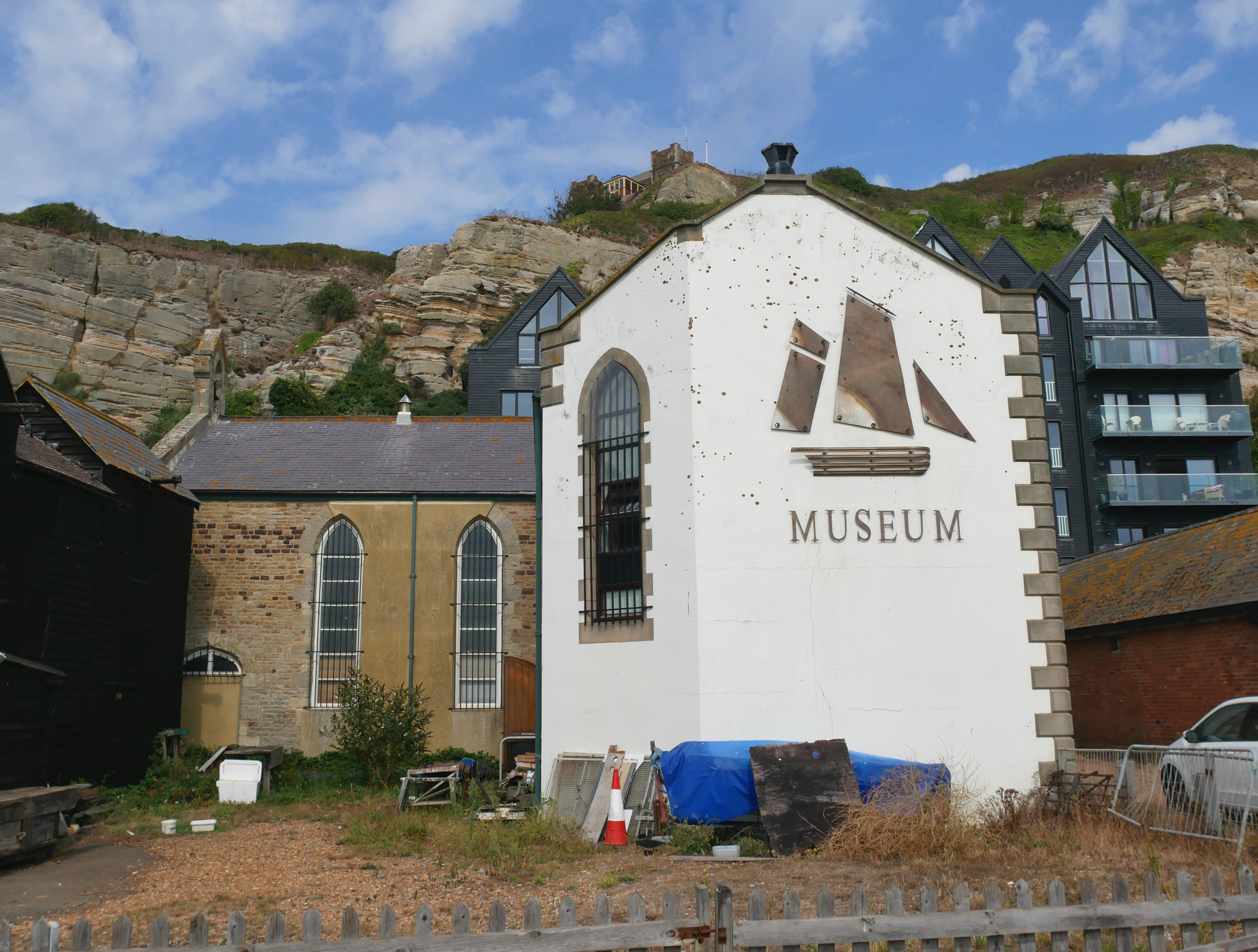
The south face of the museum

By 1801, there were only two survivors of the original seven medieval churches in Hastings: All Saints Church and St Clement's Church. The rapid growth of the town thereafter encouraged church-building, and by the 1840s the rectors of the two churches were considering providing a church in the heart of the fishing area to encourage fishermen and their families to attend: many worshipped infrequently or not at all, preferring to work on Sundays. Rev. J.G. Foyster, the rector of St Clement's Church, arranged for a missionary, Tom Tanner, to base himself at Rock-a-Nore, and he commissioned architect William Gant to build a church. Gant, who had worked with architect Sir William Tite in London, had moved to Hastings in 1852 and was primarily a house and estate designer. His simple stone building cost £529 (£50,700 as of 2025) and was built in early 1854; the first service was on 26 March of that year.

The church was not parished: it was instead designated as a chapel of ease to All Saints Church. The fishing community was initially hostile to the church, and it closed during the 1870s; the selection of a popular new chaplain, Rev. Charles Dawes, re-energised it, and by the 1880s the 290-capacity building was full at every service.

When World War II started, the church's strategic location on The Stade made it attractive to the military, who requisitioned it and turned it into an ordnance store. It suffered damage, and its future as a church was endangered when Hastings Council (into whose ownership it had passed) only offered a short-term lease. The Diocese of Chichester therefore closed it, and in the early 1950s it was used for general storage by fishermen and traders on the beach.

== Opening of the museum ==
The Old Hastings Preservation Society, a registered charity, sought to save the building in 1955. They wanted to preserve the building and use it to display a traditional Hastings lugger they had acquired. Hastings Borough Council agreed to this, and leased it to the society for use as a museum. In April 1956, one wall was partly demolished to allow the lugger to be brought in, and the town's mayor declared the museum open on 17 May 1956. It now has artefacts, photographs and paintings relating to the fishing industry and maritime history of Hastings, including many relating to the Winkle Club—founded in 1900 by the town's fishermen to improve the lives of poor children in the town. Honorary members of the club have included Sir Winston Churchill and Queen Elizabeth The Queen Mother. The museum is one of the town's most popular tourist sites, attracting about 140,000 visitors annually.

The building was listed at Grade II by English Heritage on 14 September 1976; this defines it as a "nationally important" building of "special interest". As of February 2001, it was one of 521 Grade II listed buildings, and 535 listed buildings of all grades, in the borough of Hastings.

== Architecture ==
St Nicholas' Church was a small, simple mission church with little ornamentation, and the building has seen little change since its secularisation. It is built of pale Kentish ragstone laid in courses, with a gabled slate roof and quoins faced with stucco. The east-facing gable has a small stone cross, and there is a bellcote on the west gable. The style is broadly Early English, as suggested by the lancet windows. The lack of an arch or other division between the nave and chancel created, in effect, one large interior space.

== See also ==
- List of places of worship in Hastings
