= The Stade =

Beach in Hastings, East Sussex, England

Coordinates: 50.855°N 0.593°E

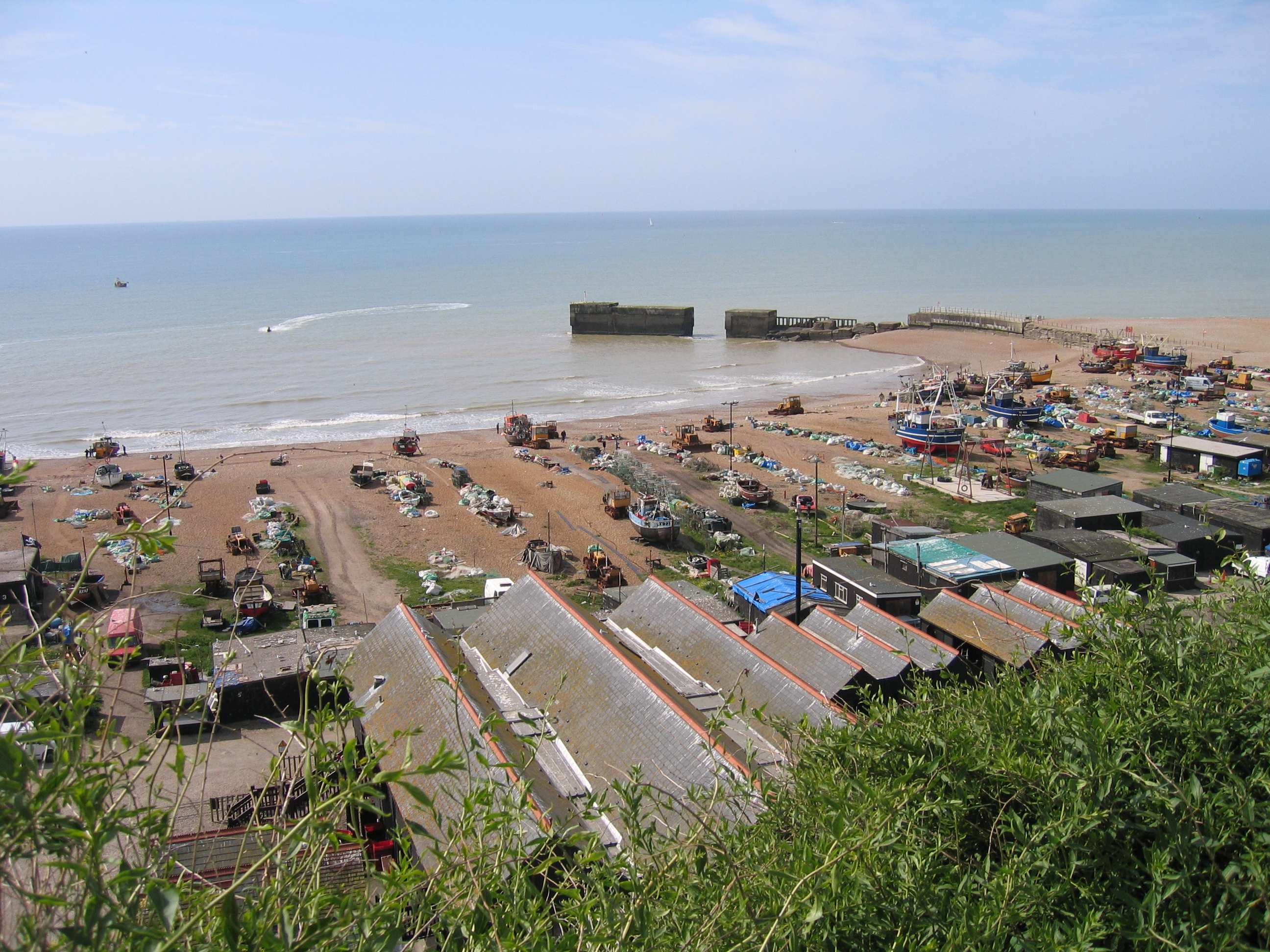
The Stade as seen from Hastings East Hill

The Stade is a shingle beach in Hastings Old Town, Hastings, East Sussex, England. It has been used for beaching boats for more than a thousand years. It is now home to Europe's largest fleet of beach-launched fishing boats.

The word stade is a Saxon term meaning landing place.

The beach was originally a small landing area; hence the small footprint of the net shops. The building of the 1887 groyne at Rock-A-Nore and the 1896 harbour, however, stopped the eastward longshore transport of shingle along the coast, which is the function of groynes. As a result, the Stade steadily grew seaward, providing new room for the fishing fleet and necessary amenities.

== Present-day fishing ==
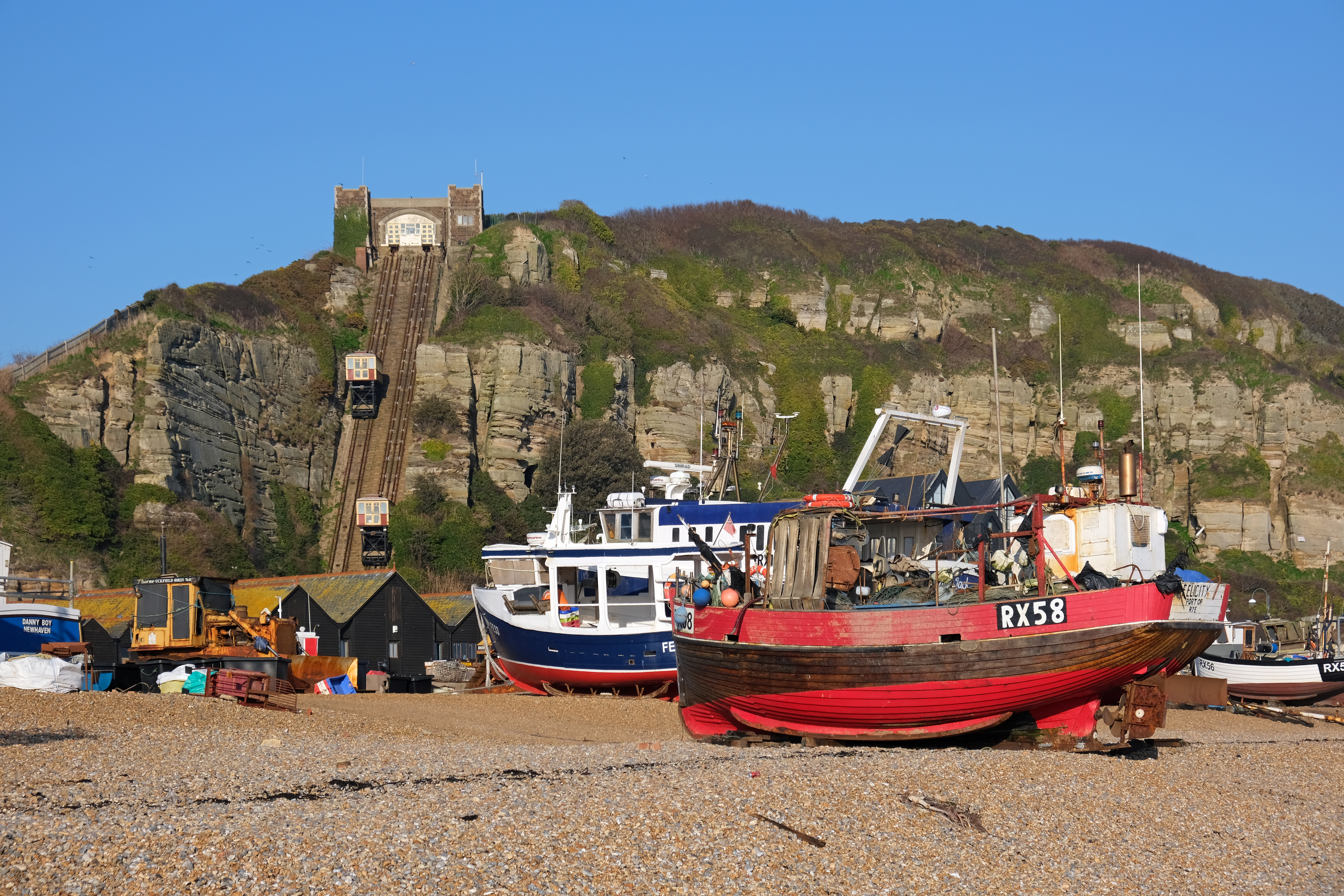
View of the Stade and the Net Shops

Europe's biggest fleet of beach-launched fishing boats are based on The Stade. They must be hauled from the sea after each trip, so they can be no longer than about ten metres. This means that they can only carry small amounts of gear and travel just a few miles. As a result the fleet has always fished in an ecologically sound way.

The Sea Fish Industry Authority described The Stade "as near perfect a fishery as could be devised", because of the environmentally sound methods used by the fishermen (which includes changing their net size to allow young cod to escape and keep stocks high). Visitors are welcome to witness the fleet in action, but must respect the fact that the area is very much a working beach with many hidden perils.

== Net shops ==
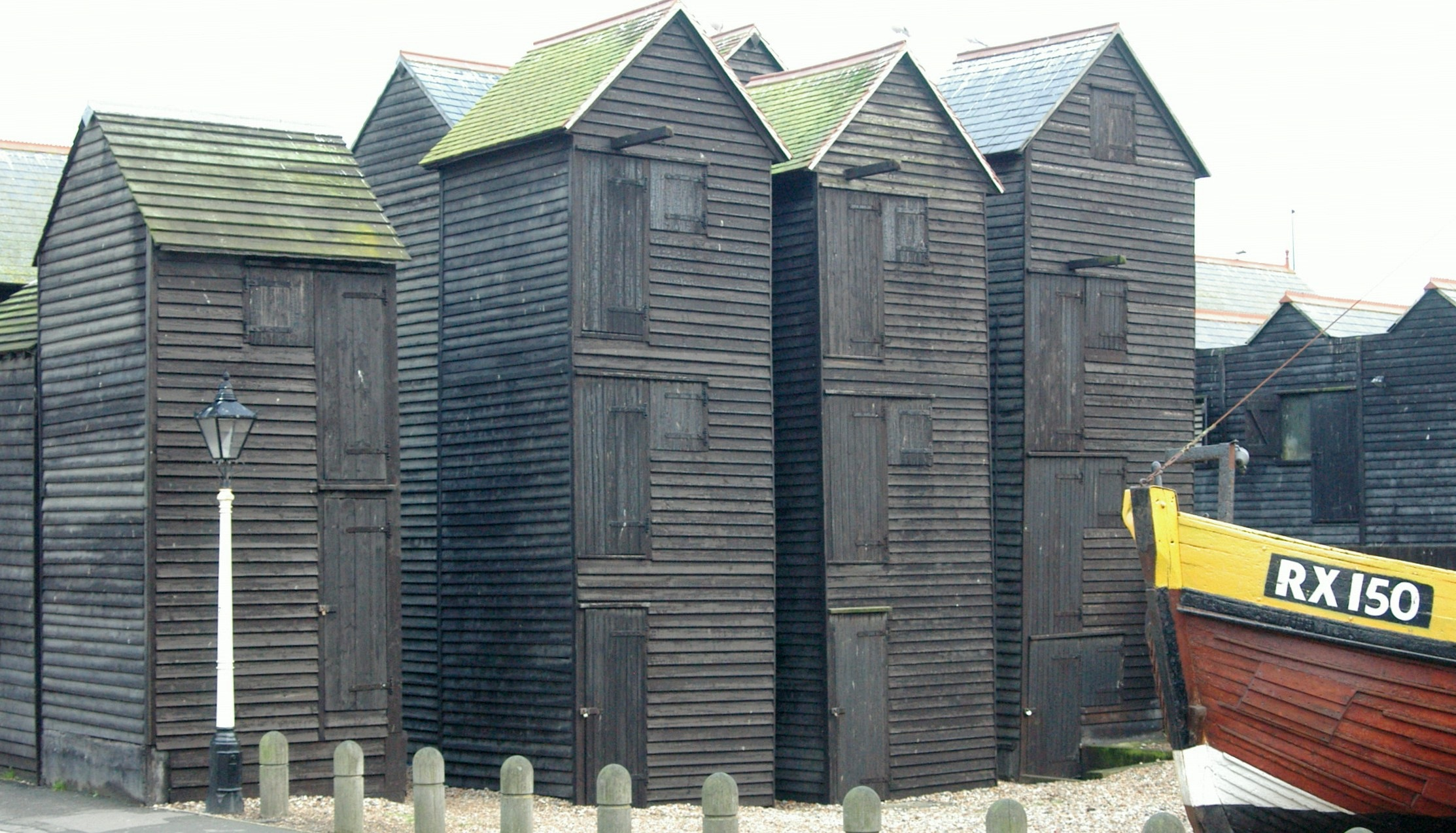
The net shops

A famous and unique part of the old town are the Net Shops. These are tall black wooden sheds which were built to provide a weather proof store for the fishing gear made from natural materials to prevent them from rotting in wet weather. The sheds are tarred (hence the colour) and weatherboarded.

The sheds were originally built on posts to allow the sea to go underneath, however more shingle has built up and the sea does not reach the huts anymore. The beach area, on which the Sheds stand, built up after groynes were erected in 1834, however the limited space meant the sheds had to grow upwards, even though some sheds do have cellars.

A common misconception is that the sheds were used for drying the nets, hence the height. This is incorrect: nets were dried on the beach, and the sheds were built for net storage – the height is due to the limited space, and inside the sheds have always had multiple floors.

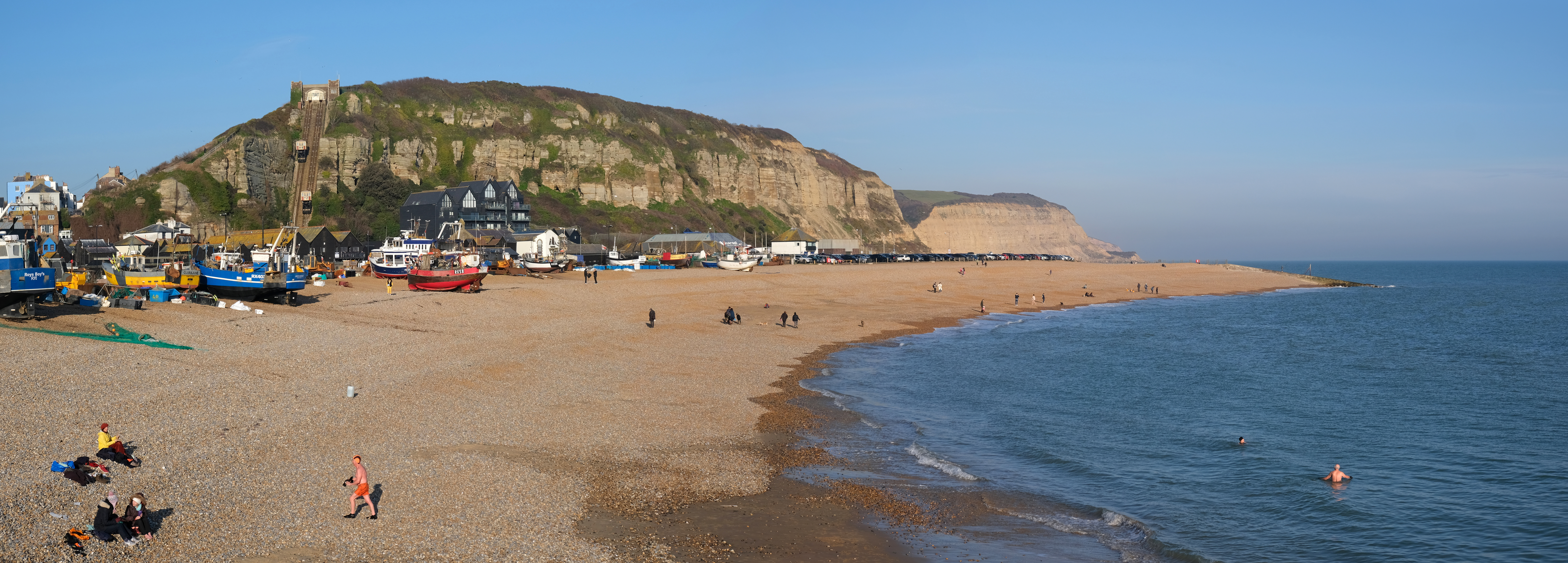
Panoramic view of The Stade

== See also ==
- Hastings Fishermen's Museum
