= Jack in the Green =

Folk custom in England

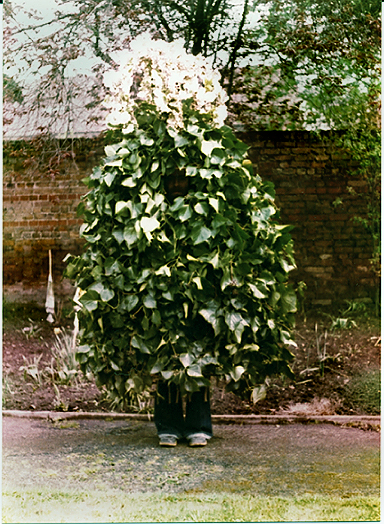
A Jack in the Green in Kingston, Surrey in the mid-1970s.

Jack in the Green, also known as Jack o' the Green, is an English folk-custom associated with the celebration of May Day. It involves a pyramidal or conical wicker or wooden framework, decorated with foliage, and worn by a person as part of a procession, often accompanied by musicians.

The Jack in the Green tradition developed in England during the 18th century. It emerged from an older May-Day tradition—first recorded in the 17th century—in which milkmaids carried milk pails that had been decorated with flowers and other objects as part of a procession. Increasingly, the decorated milk pails were replaced with decorated pyramids of objects worn on the head, and by the latter half of the 18th century the tradition had been adopted by other occupational groups, such as bunters and chimney-sweeps. The earliest known account of a Jack in the Green comes from a description of a London May-Day procession in 1770. By the 19th century, the Jack in the Green tradition had become largely associated with chimney-sweeps.

The tradition died out in the early-20th century. Later that century, various revivalist groups emerged, resurrecting the practice of Jack in the Green May-Day processions in various parts of England. The Jack in the Green has also been incorporated into various modern Pagan parades and activities.

The Jack in the Green tradition has attracted the interest of folklorists and historians since the early-20th century. Lady Raglan (1901-1971) – following an interpretive framework influenced by James Frazer and Margaret Murray – suggested that it was a survival of a pre-Christian fertility ritual. Although this became the standard interpretation in the mid-20th century, most folklorists and historians rejected the idea following the 1979 publication of Roy Judge's study on the custom, which outlined its historical development in the 18th century.

== Description ==
The Jack in the Green consists of a wooden or wicker frame that is covered in woven foliage, including green branches, leaves, and flowers. It is worn on the upper half of a human body and carried along in May Day processions. There is a slot in the frame out of which the individual inside of it can see, and the individual's feet can often be seen below the framework.

== Development ==
=== Origins in the 18th century ===
Jack in the Green emerged within the context of English May Day processions, with the folklorist Roy Judge noting that these celebrations were not "a set, immutable pattern, but rather a fluid, moving process, which combined different elements at various times". Judge thought it unlikely that the Jack in the Green itself existed much before 1770, due to an absence of either the name or the structure itself in any of the written accounts of visual depictions of English May Day processions from before that year.

The Jack in the Green developed out of a tradition that was first recorded in the 17th century, which involved milkmaids decorating themselves for May Day. In his diary, Samuel Pepys recorded observing a London May Day parade in 1667 in which milk-maids had "garlands upon their pails" and were dancing behind a fiddler. A 1698 account described milk-maids carrying not a decorated milk-pail, but a silver plate on which they had formed a pyramid-shape of objects, decorated with ribbons and flowers, and carried atop their head. The milk maids were accompanied by musicians playing either a fiddle and bag-pipe, and went door to door, dancing for the residents, who gave them payment of some form. In 1719, an account in The Tatler described a milk-maid "dancing before my door with the plate of half her customers on her head", while a 1712 account in The Spectator referred to "the ruddy Milk-Maid exerting herself in a most sprightly style under a Pyramid of Silver Tankards". These and other sources indicate that this tradition was well-established by the 18th century.

Many accounts from the second half of the 18th century describe chimney sweeps dressing up in costumes for May Day, including in wigs, crowns, and coats. Some cross-dressed in women's clothing, and many either blackened or whitened their faces. These chimney sweeps created music by banging together their brushes and shovels. Many of the descriptions of chimney sweeps at May Day make no reference to them carrying garlands, indicating that at this point this was not considered a standard part of their seasonal costume. There were nevertheless examples where sweeps did bear garlands; one of the earliest examples of this is in an illustration from 1769, in which a sweep bears a small garland on his head. This illustration also featured garlands being worn by milkmaids and bunters, implying that the custom was being adopted by various different professional groups at May Day. Throughout the eighteenth and nineteenth centuries, there are further accounts of bunters having garlands, although theirs were often made of pewter, on contrast to the milk maid's silver, reflecting their comparative socio-economic status.

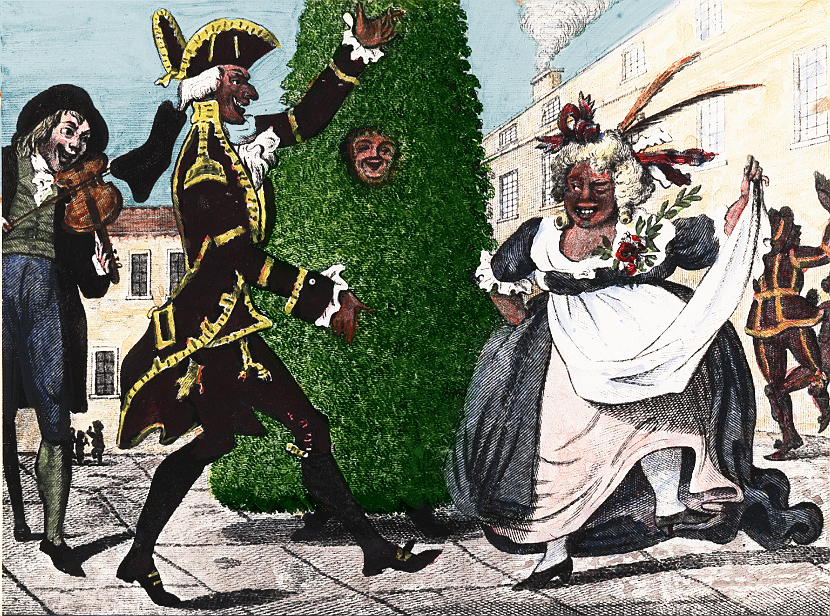
The 1795 engraving of a Jack in the Green, perhaps by Isaac Cruikshank.

The first known textual account of the Jack in the Green tradition was written in 1770 by a Frenchman who had visited London and observed a May Day procession, Peter Grosley. The earliest known reference to the term "Jack in the Green" comes from 1785, where it was referred to in a report in The Times newspaper that gave an account of a masquerade that was held at the Pantheon in London. The event would have been a largely upper-class affair, and was attended by the Prince of Wales. The earliest possible pictorial reference to a Jack in the Green comes from a picture titled "May Day" that was produced between 1775 and 1785. This image featured a procession in which three garlands of metal objects are in the foreground, but in the background of the image is something that resembles a foliate Jack in the Green. A clearer depiction of a Jack in the Green was featured in a 1795 engraving, perhaps by Isaac Cruikshank, which included the foliate figure alongside a fiddler with a wooden leg, a man, and a cross-dressed "May Queen"; in the background are dancing chimney sweeps.

This evidence reflects that while the Jack in the Green was brought out at May Day events, where chimney sweeps were also regularly present, the Jack in the Green itself was not yet closely associated with the sweeps, as it would become in the following century. Judge suggested that it would have been "neatly appropriate" had the foliate Jack in the Green been developed by greengrocers or members of another trade that worked closely with fauna, however, he noted that there was no evidence for this.

=== 19th- and early-20th-century developments ===
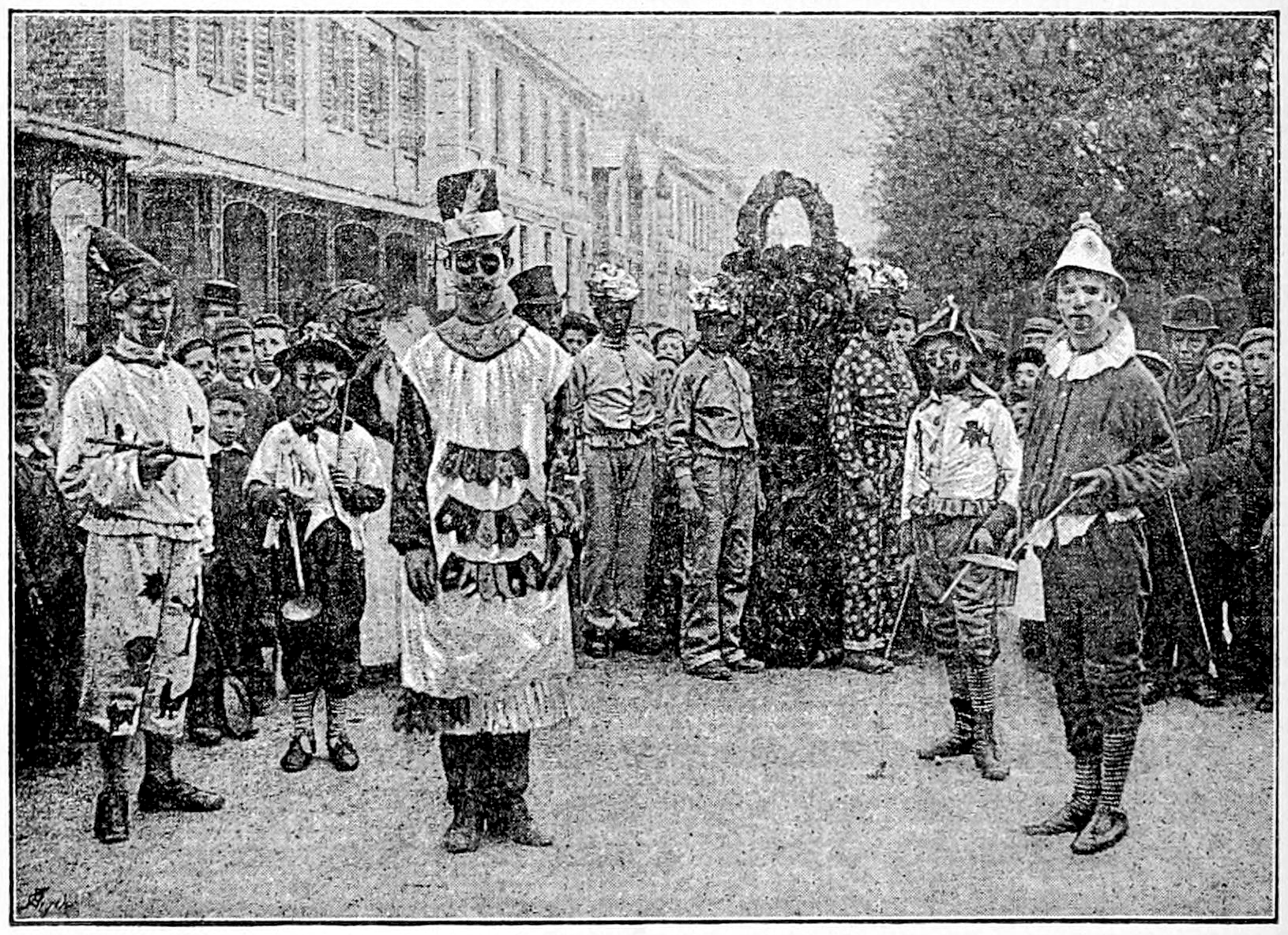
May Day in Cheltenham, 1892, from Folk-Lore Vol 4 (1893)

The Jack in the Green tradition is well recorded in the nineteenth and early twentieth centuries. Between 1806 and 1883, the Jack in the Green came to gain a central part in the English May Day processions. The Jack in the Green tradition came to be associated especially with chimney sweeps. In the mid-19th century, many London chimney sweep families migrated to other towns in the south-east and brought the tradition with them; Jack-in-the-Green practices are for instance recorded from the Kentish towns of Lewisham, Deptford, Greenwich, Bromley, and Orpington.

By the beginning of the 20th century the custom had started to wane as a result of disapproval of bawdy and anarchic behaviour. The Lord and Lady of the May, with their practical jokes, were replaced by a pretty May Queen, while the noisy, drunken Jack in the Green vanished altogether from the parades. The Jack-in-the Green custom practiced at Whitstable in Kent for instance died out around 1912.

== Folkloric study ==
In a 1939 article, Lady Raglan proposed that the Jack in the Green tradition was linked to the medieval church carvings which she described as the "Green Man". She further interpreted both the Jack in the Green and the Green Men as pre-Christian spirits of nature and fertility. Her interpretation was an extension of the ideas about fertility deities which had been promoted by the anthropologist James Frazer in his influential book, The Golden Bough. Raglan's linking of the Jack in the Green to the Green Man and pre-Christian belief systems took "direct inspiration"—in the words of historian Ronald Hutton—from the 1934 suggestion by folklorist Margaret Murray that the Sheela-na-Gig carvings found in medieval churches represented pre-Christian fertility goddesses.

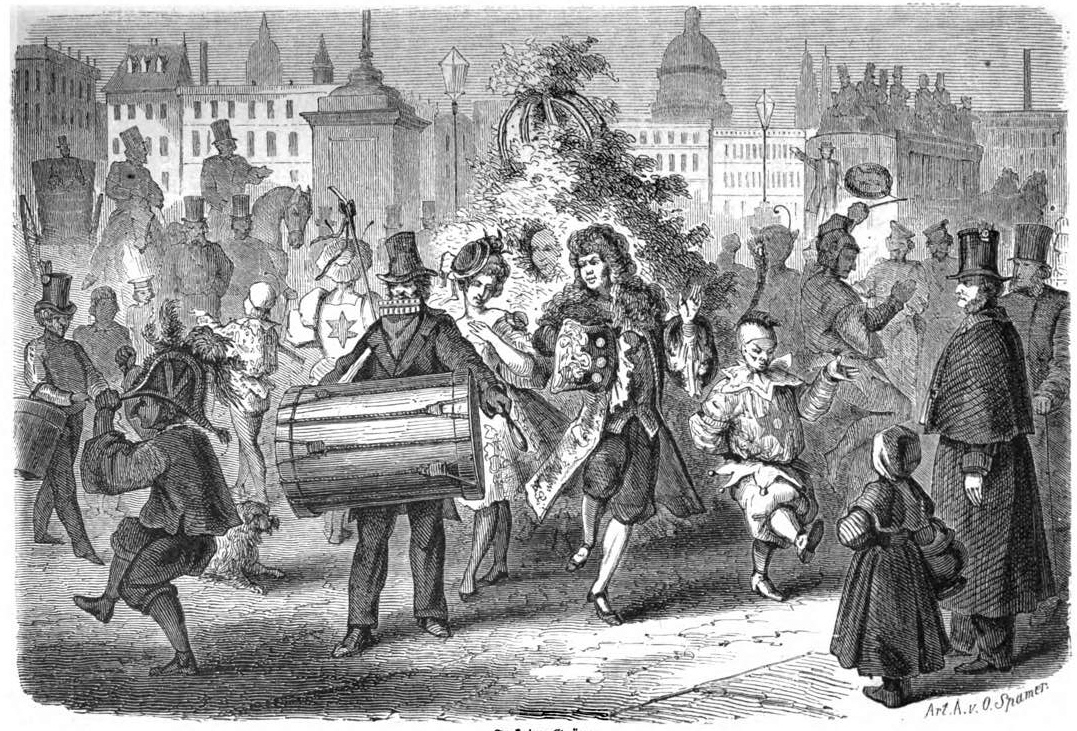
An 1863 depiction of a May Day parade featuring a Jack in the Green

According to Hutton, Raglan's presentation of the Jack in the Green as a pre-Christian survival "so perfectly reflected what mid-20th-century folklorists wished to believe that it became an orthodoxy". In her 1976 overview of British folk customs, for instance, the folklorist Christina Hole suggested that Jack in the Green was a "very ancient figure" who represented "the Summer itself, the very old bringer-in of the time of plenty".

This interpretation would be rejected by folklorists after the 1979 publication of a historical study on the Jack in the Green tradition written by the folklorist Roy Judge and published by the Folklore Society. This monograph had been based on Judge's doctoral research, carried out at the University of Leeds' Folklife Studies Institute. Hutton described Judge's book as "a turning-point in folklore studies which showed how much could be learned from a systematic investigation of historical evidence". It was, in his view, "one of the first triumphs" of a movement within British folkloristics that sought "to reintroduce a scholarly rigour to their field". Writing Judge's obituary for The Guardian, Derek Schofield stated that Judge's book "set new standards of meticulous research in a discipline that has frequently attracted shoddy and fanciful scholarship".

== Revivals ==
In the 1970s, Gordon Newton and his Motley Morris troupe revived the custom in Rochester, Kent. This grew in popularity, and was expanded into the broader May Day Rochester Sweeps Festival. Another revival took place in Whitstable.

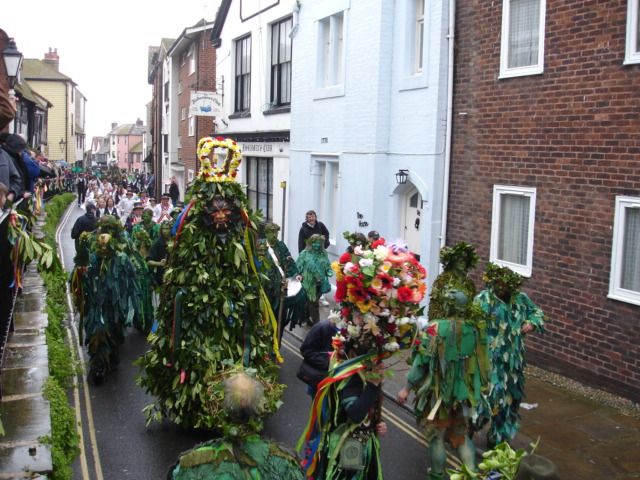
Hastings Jack in the Green procession.

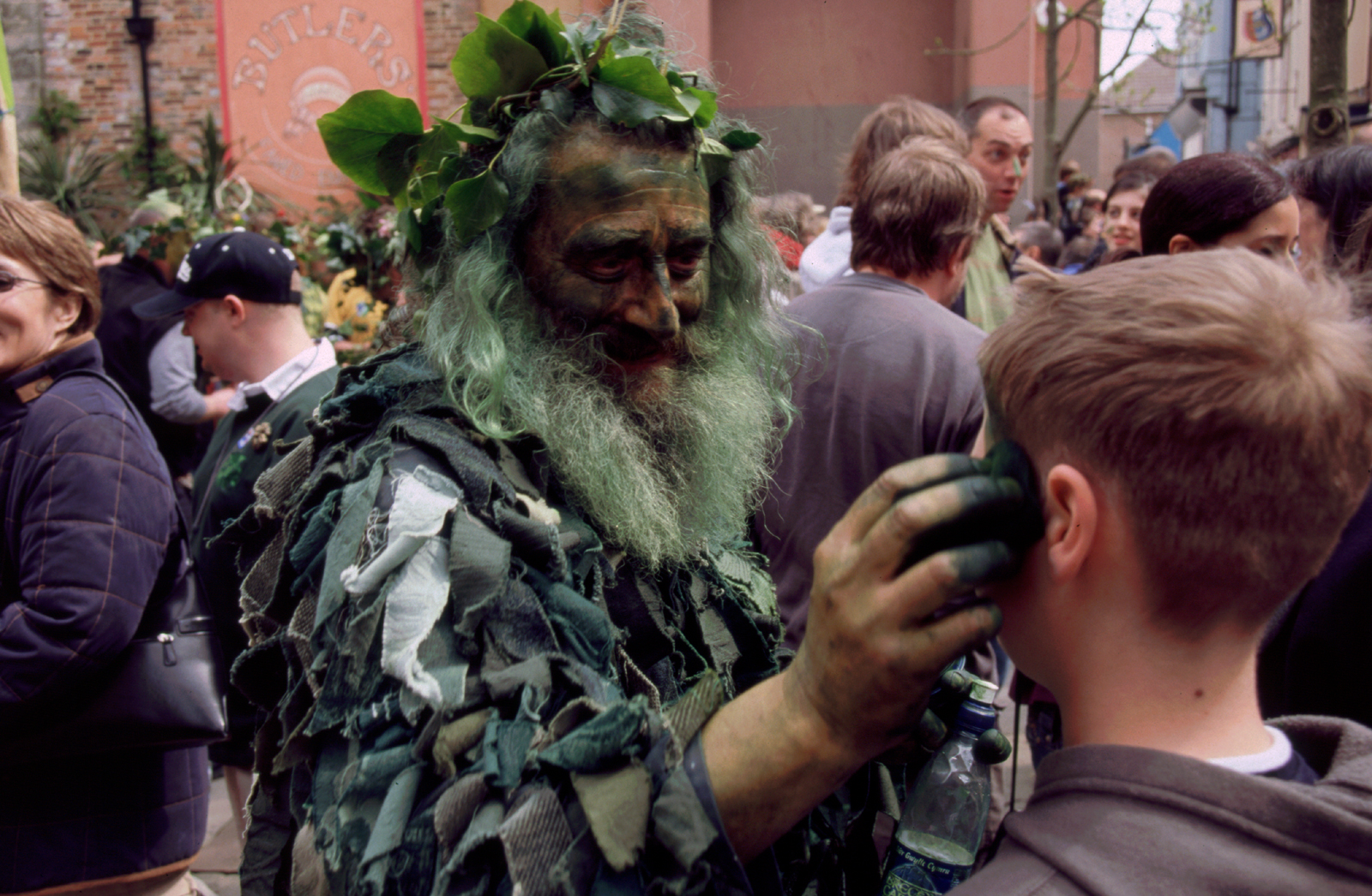
A bogey at Jack in the Green, Hastings.

Another revival occurred in Hastings during 1983 and has become a major event of the Hastings Old Town calendar. Ilfracombe in North Devon has had a Jack in the Green procession and celebration since 2000. It is participated with by local schoolchildren, dancing around the maypole on the sea front, and by local Morris men and dance groups from in and around the district.

Jack is a colourful figure, almost 3 m (9.8 ft) tall, covered in greenery and flowers. In Whitstable, he is accompanied by two attendants, representing the legendary figures of Robin Hood and Maid Marian. In Hastings, he is also accompanied by attendants, here known as Bogies, who are completely disguised in green rags, vegetation, and face paint. The attendants play music, dance and sing as they guide Jack through the streets to celebrate the coming of summer.

Revivals of the custom have occurred in various parts of England; Jacks in the Green have been seen in Bristol, Oxford and Knutsford, among other places. Evercreech Jack in the Green takes place in early May at The Old Stores Studio in the village of Evercreech near Bruton in Somerset. Jacks also appear at May Fairs in North America. In Deptford the Fowler's Troop and Blackheath Morris have been parading the tallest and heaviest modern Jack for many decades, either in Greenwich, Bermondsey and the Borough or at Deptford itself, and at the end of May a Jack is an essential part of the Pagan Pride parade in Holborn.

=== Current Jacks in the Green ===
A large number of Jacks parade each year keeping the tradition alive. Some are revivals based on traditional customs that ended during the 19th century, whilst others are new, based on writings or pictures depicting earlier Jacks. The following list are currently active:

- Bradford-on-Avon: Bradford on Avon Green Man Festival
- Brentham Garden Suburb, London: Brentham has a big celebration every May which includes a Jack in the Green described as "a walking, talking bush" who sometimes parades barefoot.
- Bristol: A Jack in the Green was recorded in Bristol about 1865 by a woman who remembered seeing him with a sweep and a queen on the outskirts of the city. The revived Bristol Jack in the Green appears on the first Saturday in May starting from the historic Harbourside (outside M Shed museum) and leads a procession through the streets of Bristol, eventually ending the day on Horfield Common where he is "slain" (and ripped apart by onlookers) to "release the spirit of summer".
- Evercreech, Somerset: Evercreech Jack in the Green emerges from The Old Stores Studio in early May and is accompanied by musicians, drummers and followers on a procession to The Bullzini Circus Field for a celebration to banish winter and release the Sprit of Summer, embodied by a joyous female icon who welcomes the summer months.
- Carshalton, London: A Celebration of Harvest, this occurs during September each year. A straw Jack is stripped in the evening so that all present can take a keepsake and the body is burnt in a brazier.
- Central London:The parade starts from the Conway Hall, Red Lion Square, London WC1, led by traditional giants, the Jack-in-the-Green and Bogies.
- City of London: Rather than a revival, the City of London Jack-in-the-Green is based on descriptions and illustrations from early writings. During the late 1970s Greenwood Morris, who danced at Alexandra Palace, would bring their Jack into the City for an evening tour of London Wall and Smithfield. One lunchtime an all day event was discussed and the City of London Jack was invented and was first paraded during 1984. Tradition has it that the City of London Jack only comes out on City working days.
- Deptford, London: The Fowlers Troop Jack was revived during the early 1980s by members of the Blackheath Morris Men and friends. It is a revival of a Jack in the Green from about 1906 which was paraded by the original Fowlers Troop. The Fowlers Jack goes out on the streets of South East London or the City of London each May Day. The Jack is usually dressed on 30 April and is paraded on May Day.
- Guildford: a Jack in the Green features in the annual Summerpole celebration hosted by Pilgrim Morris. The festival takes place annually on the Saturday of the Mayday Bank Holiday weekend, the event name reflects court records from 1611 that refer to 'the Sommer Pole beinge found by his longe standinge over againste the parish church of St Mary in Guldeforde'.
- Hastings, East Sussex: The Hastings Jack-in-the-Green festival was revived by local group Mad Jacks Morris Dancers during 1983 and is now one of the biggest annual gatherings of Morris dancers in the country. The Jack is "released" every year and is important to the festival. The main procession of the Jack takes place on the May Bank Holiday Monday through the streets of Hastings Old Town, starting from the Fishermen's Museum. The Jack is accompanied by the Bogies, Black Sal, the Fat man with a drum and other character, Hastings RX Morris, dancers, giants, drummers and various other Morris sides. The procession ends on the West Hill where Jack is "slain" to "release the spirit of summer". The current Bristol Jack is a direct descendant of the Hastings Jack.
- Ilfracombe, North Devon: Ilfracombe Jack-in-the-Green normally takes the streets the first Sunday of May.
- Knutsford, Cheshire: May Day in Knutsford is celebrated during the May Bank Holiday weekend. The emphasis is the May Queen but there is a Jack in the Green.
- Oxford: A Jack in the Green appears in Oxford on May Day. A traditional Jack was famously photographed in Oxford by Sir Benjamin Stone.
- Rochester, Kent: The Rochester Sweeps festival was revived during 1981 and still has a Jack in the Green Ceremony where the Jack is awoken by dancers and sweeps on Blue Bell Hill at dawn on May Morning (approximately 5:32 am) at the Blue Bell Hill picnic area. The Jack is paraded through the street (usually on the Bank Holiday Monday) starting in Rochester Castle Gardens and taking a circular route. The festival is attended by hundreds of Morris sides.
- Whitstable, Kent: Oyster Morris have their own Green Man who combines the roles of Jester and announcer dressed in white and green. The Jack is central to the Whitstable May Day celebrations.
- Mylor, South Australia: 'The English Ale' is a unique seasonal gathering in Australia inspired by Jack-in-the-Green and other English folk customs which takes place in the township of Mylor in the picturesque Adelaide Hills. Being in the Southern Hemisphere, it is an autumn gathering celebrating various village customs and ritual traditions of England, whilst also acknowledging the end of the hot dry Australian summer, the end of the fire season and moving into the 'greener' times of the year. A Jack and Giants are paraded around Mylor Oval, with dancers, guisers, and hobby horses, followed by a Peramangk Welcome to Country ceremony and the burning of a Wicker man with music, food and dance.

== See also ==
- May Day Run
- Sussex Bonfire Societies
- Trees in mythology
- Walpurgis Night
