= Hastings Old Town =

Area of Hastings, East Sussex, England

Coordinates: 50°51′24.44″N 0°35′31.18″E

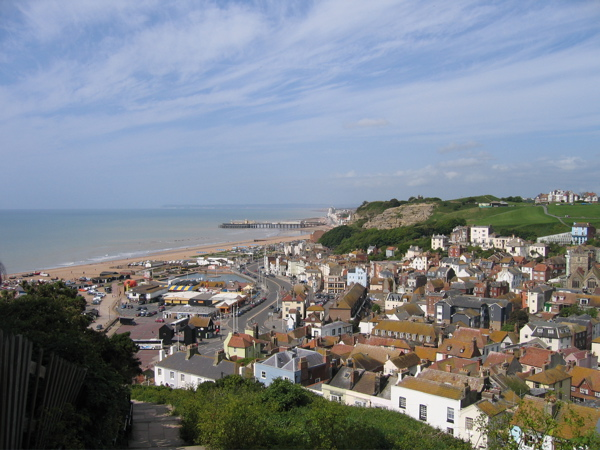
View of Hastings Old Town from the East Hill

Hastings Old Town is an area in Hastings, England, roughly corresponding to the extent of the town prior to the nineteenth century. It lies mainly within the easternmost valley of the current town. The shingle beach known as The Stade (the old Saxon term meaning "landing place") is home to the biggest beach-launched fishing fleet in Britain.

Many events take place every year in the old town, including Jack In The Green and the Bonfire Procession. Many of these events are centred on Winkle Island, which is also the gathering place of the Winkle Club.

== Net Shops ==
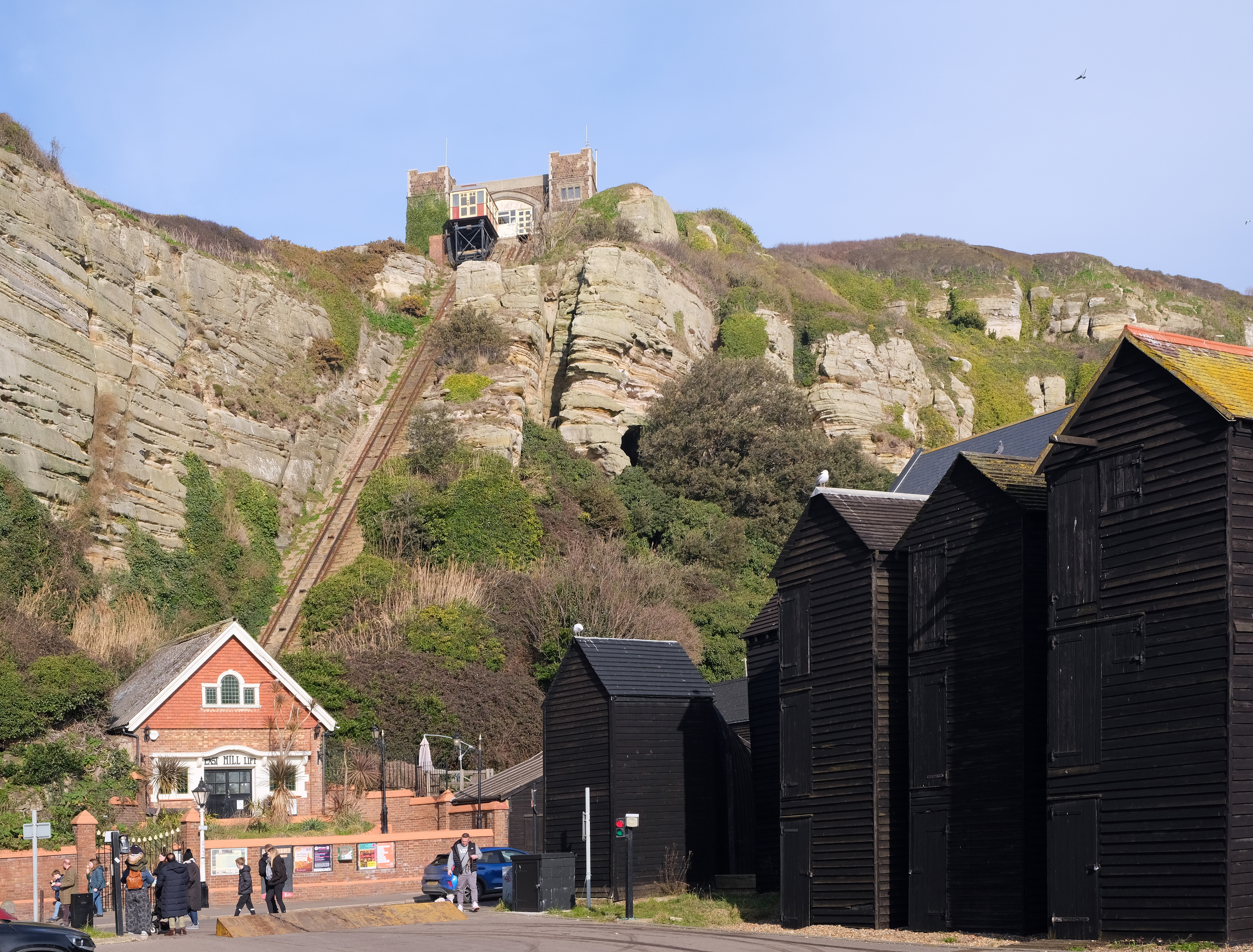
View of East Hill Cliff Railway and the Net Shops

The Net Shops are tall black wooden sheds that were built to provide a weather-proof store for the fishing gear made from natural materials to prevent them from rotting in wet weather. The sheds were originally built on posts to allow the sea to go underneath, however, more shingle has built up and the sea no longer reaches the huts. The beach area on which the Sheds stand built up after groynes were erected in 1834, however, the limited space meant the sheds had to grow upwards, even though some sheds do have cellars.

Local historian and author Steve Peak says about the net shops:

The old town's Net Shops - approximately 50 black wooden sheds standing in neat rows on a shingle beach are unique. They were built to provide weather-proof stores for fishing gear made of natural materials that rotted if wet for a long time. Today's materials are artificial and can be left in the open. Most net shops stand on a piece of beach that appeared suddenly after the first of the town's groynes were erected in 1834. The new beach area was small and close to the sea, so each shop could only have about eight or nine feet square to build on. But all boats had more nets than could be stored in such limited space, so the sheds had to grow upwards. Some have cellars. Many originally stood on posts to let the sea go underneath. Fishermen keep spare gear in the shops. One is a museum.

== Churches ==
Two medieval Anglican churches—All Saints and St Clement's—and the former Ebenezer Particular Baptist Chapel of 1817 (now a house) are in the Old Town. St Clement's was used as a filming location for the 2002 TV series Foyle's War. The former St Nicholas' Church, an unparished mission chapel built in 1854 to serve the fishermen, was converted into the Hastings Fishermen's Museum in 1956. Also, in the old town is the Grade II listed St Mary Star of the Sea Church.

== Lifeboats ==
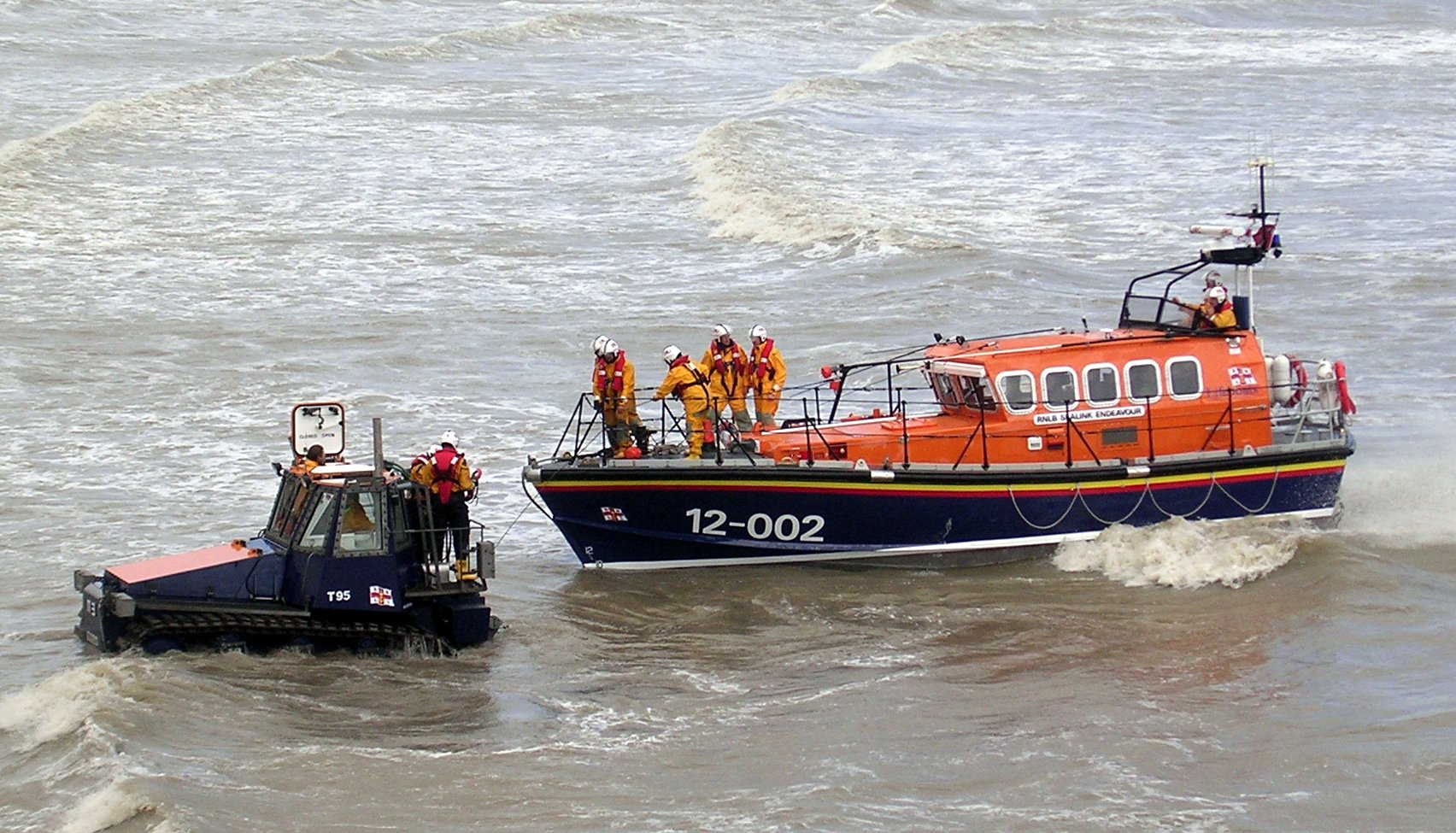
Former Hastings Mersey Class lifeboat being towed back to beach by its tractor after a public demonstration run during Old Town Week, 2005

Hastings RNLI lifeboat station, based in the Old Town, was established in 1858. It currently operates a state-of-the art waterjet drive Shannon Class all-weather lifeboat, as well as a D class inshore rescue boat. Both boats are beach launched from either side of the harbour arm. The all-weather lifeboat is launched from a 22-metre-long Supercat 'Shannon Launch and Recovery System' (SLARS) - a hydraulically powered mobile slipway / turntable which is driven into the sea. Upon recovery, the boat is beached at speed and winched back up the beach and onto the slipway. The slipway is connected to and hauled by a caterpillar-tracked semi submersible tractor unit, marinised so that it can operate in up to 2.4 m of water. If needed the rig can be sealed by the operator and abandoned, surviving in up to 10 m of water until it can be recovered. The D class inshore lifeboat is launched from a wheeled carriage towed or pushed by a tracked 'Bobcat' launch vehicle into the surf. The carriage can also be launched and recovered on a towline if beach conditions require it. Hastings Lifeboat Station also operate a CAT D4C Bulldozer for beach maintenance and to assist in the event of the breakdown or immobilisation of a primary launch vehicle.

== Buildings ==
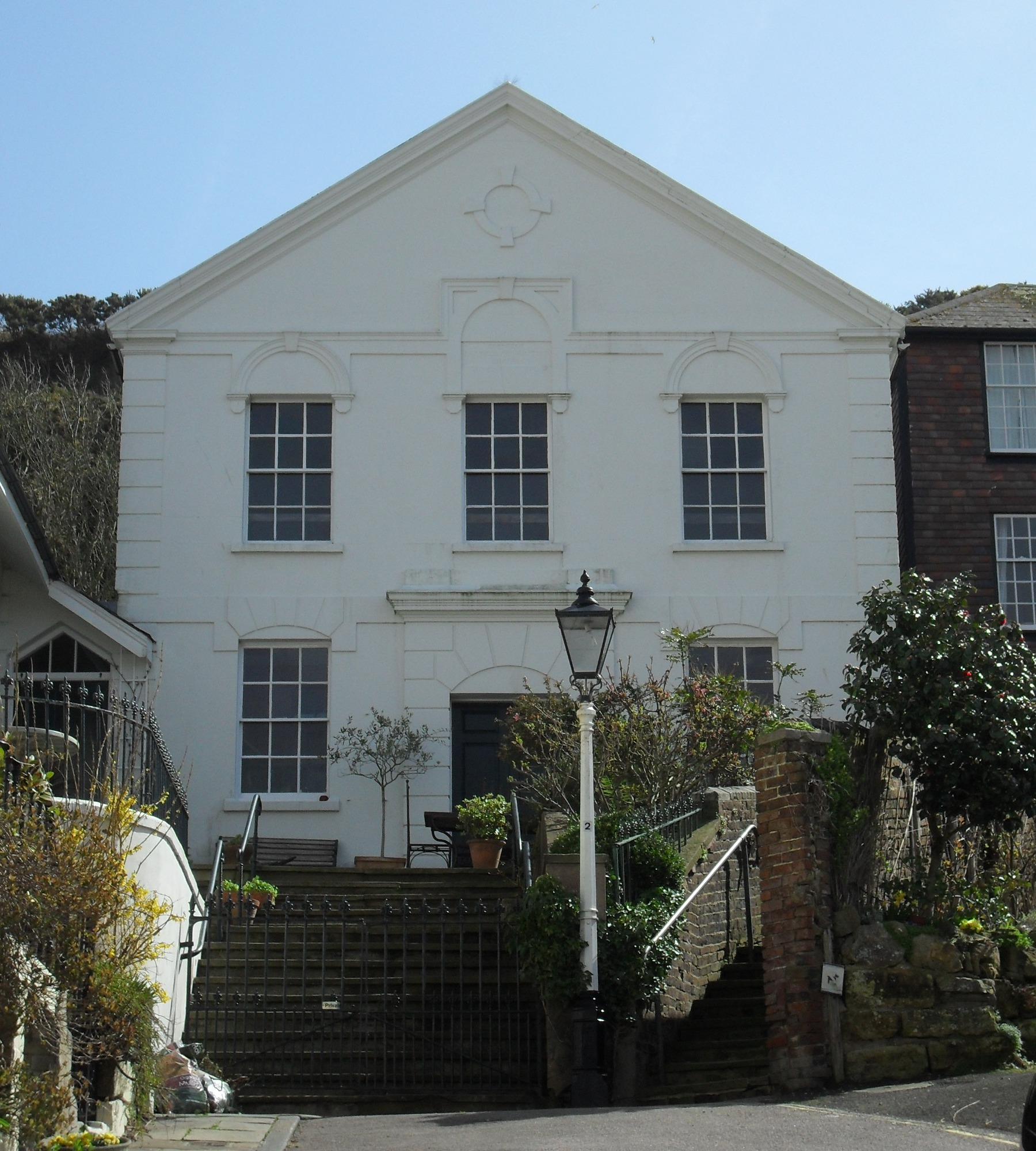
The former Ebenezer Particular Baptist Chapel

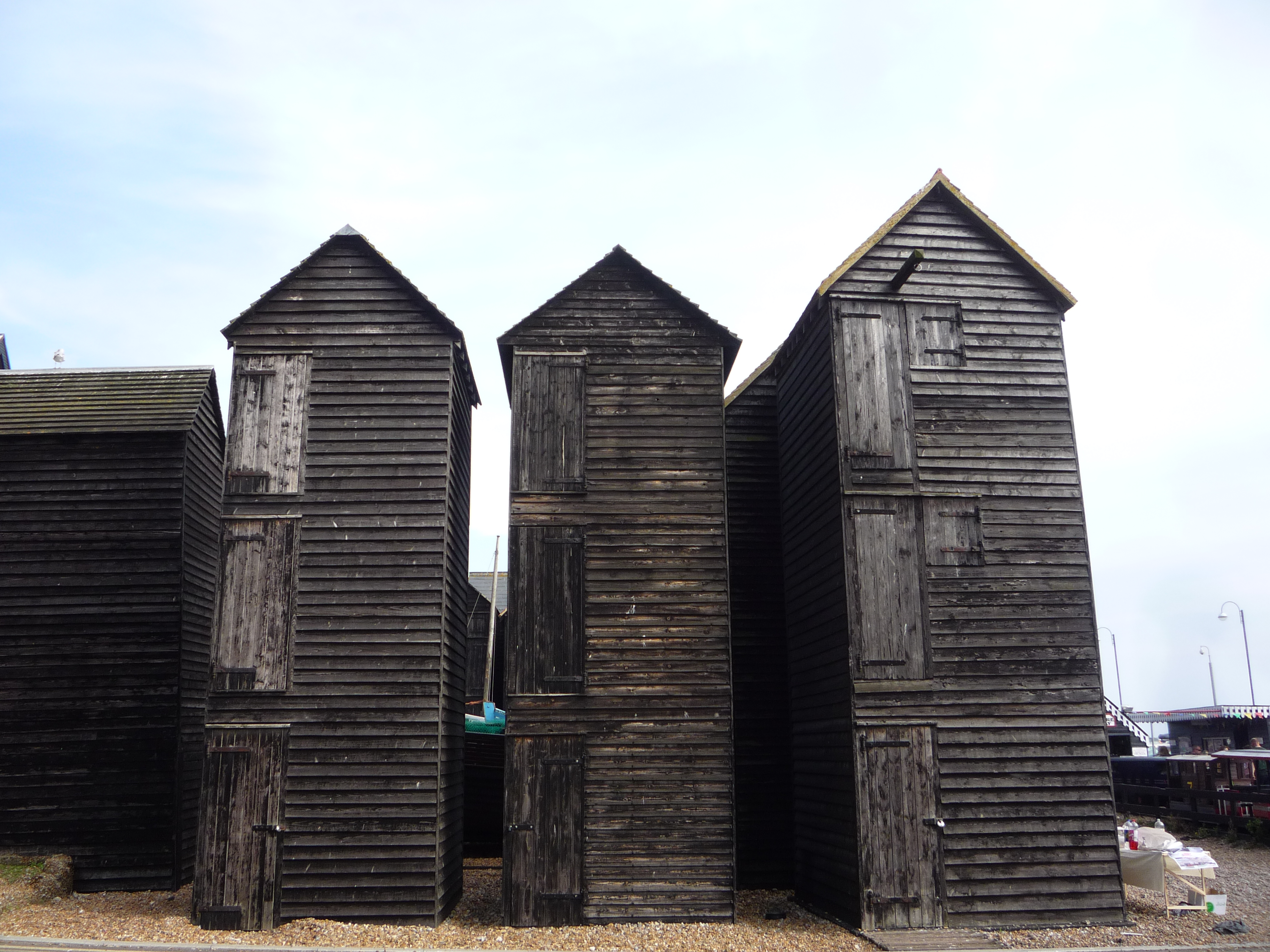
Three of the Net Shops

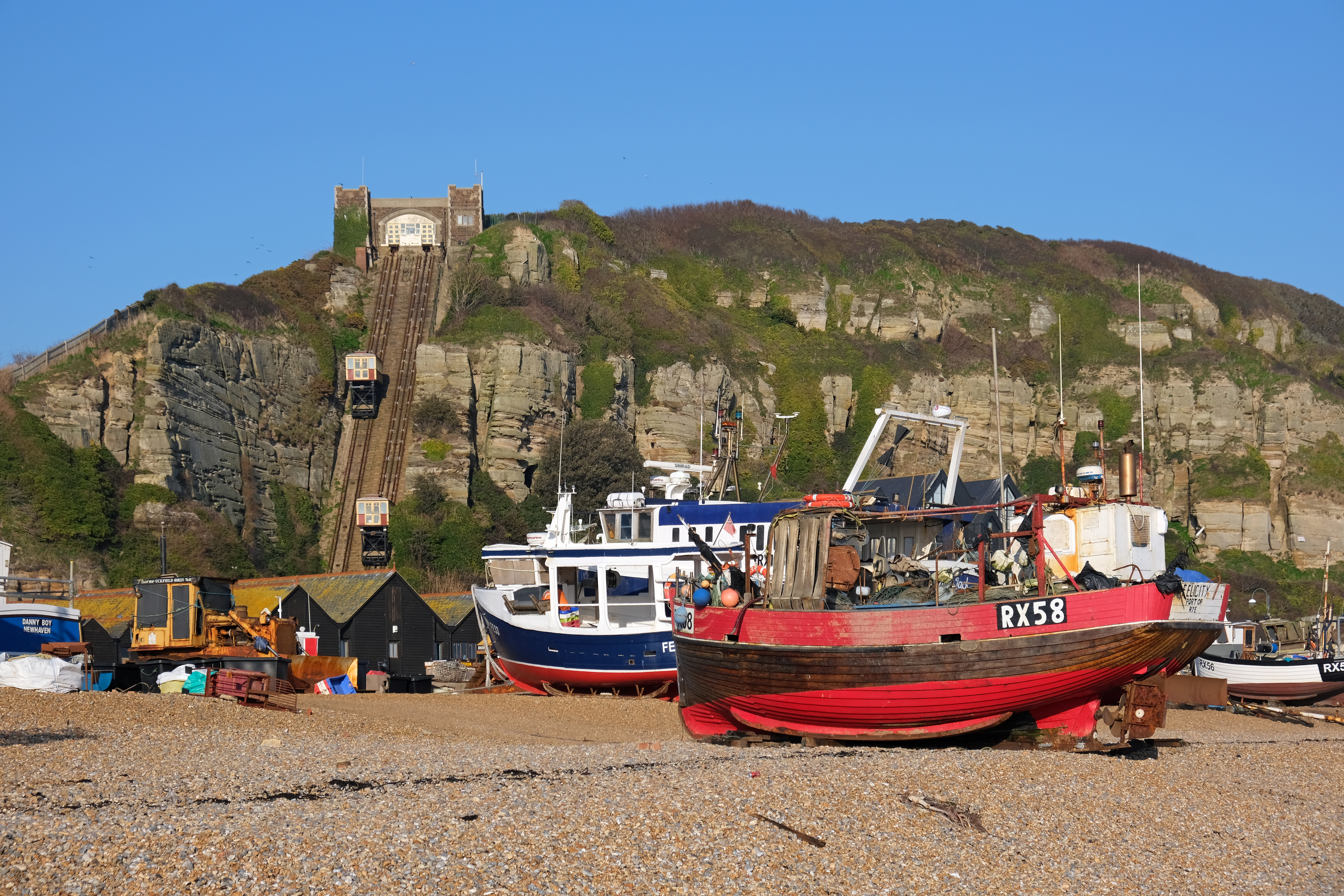
The Stade

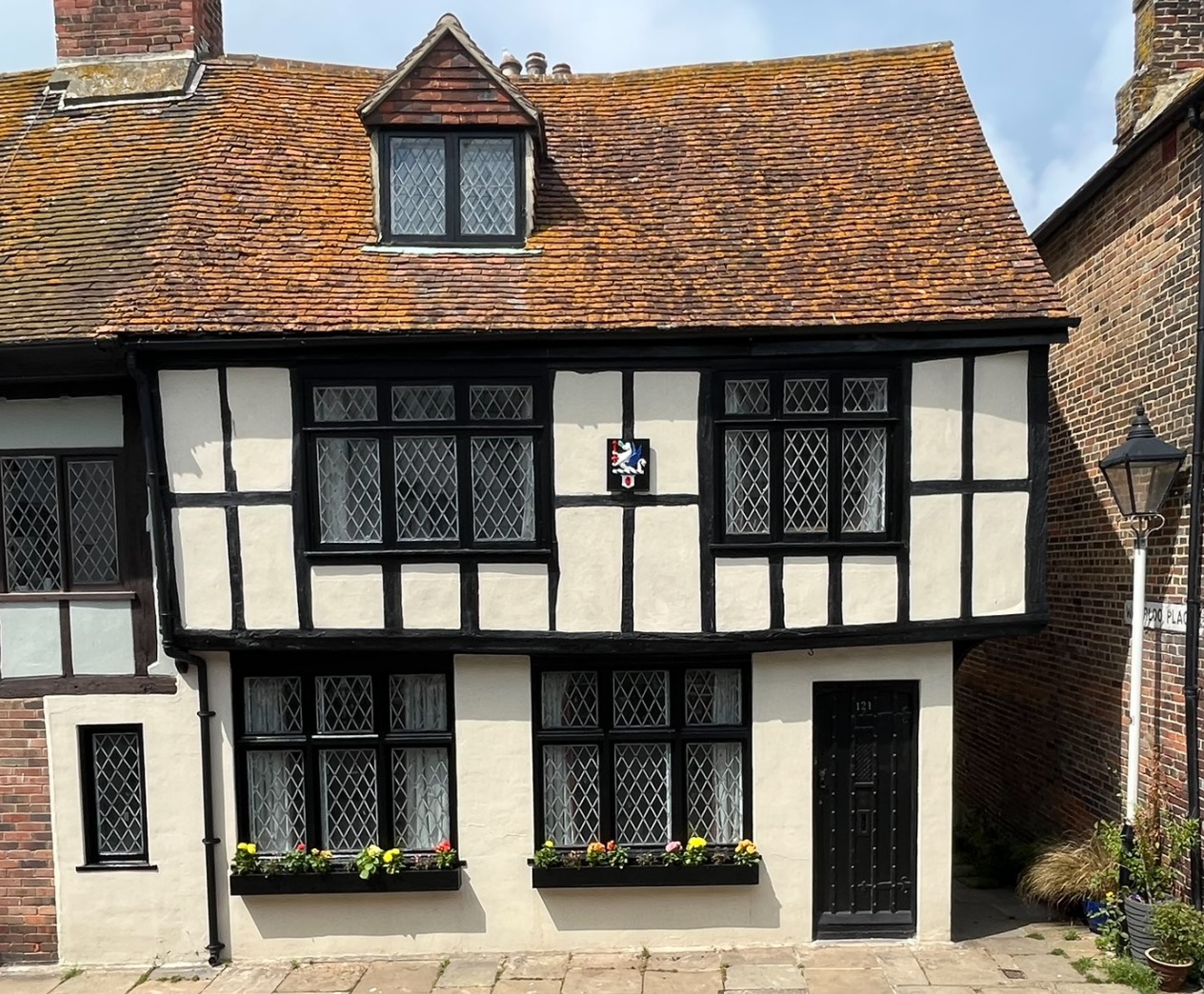
121 All Saints Street Hastings
