= List of shipwrecks in 1798 =

The list of shipwrecks in 1798 includes ships sunk, foundered, wrecked, grounded or otherwise lost during 1798.

table of contents
1798
Jan	Feb	Mar	Apr
May	Jun	Jul	Aug
Sep	Oct	Nov	Dec
Unknown date

== January ==
=== 5 January ===
List of shipwrecks: 5 January 1798
Ship	State	Description
Chéri	France	War of the First Coalition: The privateer frigate was sunk in the Bay of Biscay by HMS Pomone ( (Kingdom of Great Britain) Royal Navy). Pomone rescued her 220 crew.

=== 23 January ===
List of shipwrecks: 23 January 1798
Ship	State	Description
Berezan (Березань)	Imperial Russian Navy	The transport ship was driven ashore in ru:Artillery Bay, off Sevastopol. She was wrecked on 26 January. Her crew were rescued.

=== Unknown date ===
List of shipwrecks: Unknown date in January 1798
Ship	State	Description
Adriana	Great Britain	The ship was lost near Stavanger, Norway. She was on a voyage from Saint Petersburg, Russia to Hull, Yorkshire.
Aid	Great Britain	The ship was driven ashore at South Shields, County Durham. She was on a voyage from Saint Petersburg to Leith, Lothian.
Ann	Great Britain	The ship was wrecked on the Torreshaw. She was on a voyage from Copenhagen, Denmark to Lisbon, Portugal.
Atkinson	Great Britain	The ship was driven ashore at Ramsgate, Kent. She was on a voyage from London to Bridport, Dorset. Atkinson was later refloated.
Castor	Great Britain	The ship was wrecked on the Braen Reef, in the Baltic Sea. She was on a voyage from Narva, Russia, to Hull.
Castor	Great Britain	The ship collided with Minerva (Great Britain) in The Downs and was beached at Ramsgate. She was on a voyage from Bengal, India to London.
Commerce	Great Britain	The ship capsized in the Humber upstream of Hull with the loss of all hands. She was on a voyage from London to Selby, Yorkshire.
Diligent	Great Britain	The ship departed from Liverpool, Lancashire, for São Miguel Island, Azores. No further trace, presumed foundered with the loss of all hands.
Elizabeth & Mary	Great Britain	The ship was wrecked on the coast of Norway. She was on a voyage from Riga, Russia to a Scottish port.
Fanny	Great Britain	The transport ship collided with the transport ship Briton (Great Britain and foundered. All on board were rescued. Fanny was on a voyage from Cork, Ireland to Halifax, Nova Scotia, British America.
Favourite	United States	The ship was driven ashore on the coast of Holland. She was on a voyage from Philadelphia, Pennsylvania, to Rotterdam, South Holland, Batavian Republic.
Fortitude	Ireland	The ship was wrecked in the Orkney Islands, Great Britain. She was on a voyage from Danzig to Belfast, County Antrim.
Freede	Hamburg	The ship was lost on the Vogel Sand, in the North Sea. She was on a voyage from Hamburg to London.
Friends Endeavour	Great Britain	The ship was driven ashore at Newhaven, Sussex. She was on a voyage from London to Falmouth, Cornwall.
George	Great Britain	The ship was driven ashore at Saltcoats, Ayrshire. She was on a voyage from Tortola to Liverpool, Lancashire.
Goodhope	Great Britain	The ship was driven ashore near Beachy Head, Sussex.
Hector	Great Britain	The ship was driven ashore and wrecked at the mouth of the River Lune. She was on a voyage from Demerara to Lancaster, Lancashire.
Henry	United States	The ship was driven ashore at Hellevoetsluis, Zeeland, Batavian Republic. She was on a voyage from New York to Rotterdam.
Paris	Great Britain	The ship was driven ashore at Ramsgate. She was on a voyage from London to Liverpool.
Peggy	Great Britain	The ship ran aground on the Goodwin Sands, Kent. She was on a voyage from Cardiff, Glamorgan to London She was refloated and taken in to Broadstairs, Kent.
Pritzler	Great Britain	The whaler was lost near Beachy Head with the loss of her captain.
Robert	Great Britain	The ship was driven ashore and wrecked on Öland, Sweden. She was on a voyage from Saint Petersburg, Russia to London.
Sophia	Great Britain	War of the First Coalition: The ship was captured by a French privateer and was subsequently lost near the Île d'Yeu, Finistère, France. She was on a voyage from London to Madeira.
Surprize	Great Britain	The ship was driven ashore at Neath, Glamorgan.
Three Friends	Great Britain	The ship was wrecked near Coleraine, County Antrim, with the loss of all but her captain. She was on a voyage from Liverpool to Londonderry, Ireland.
Virginia and Philadelphia Packet	United States	The ship departed from Jamaica for Norfolk, Virginia in mid-January. No further trace, presumed foundered with the loss of all hands.
Warsuch	Hamburg	The ship was lost whilst on a voyage from Hamburg to Copenhagen.

== February ==
=== 1 February ===
List of shipwrecks: 1 February 1798
Ship	State	Description
Ocean	Great Britain	The East Indiaman was wrecked on Kalatoa (7°19′S 121°00′E). Her crew survived.

=== 3 February ===
List of shipwrecks: 3 February 1798
Ship	State	Description
Phœnix	Great Britain	The ship was lost near Boulogne-sur-Mer, Pas-de-Calais, France. Her crew were rescued. She was on a voyage from Lisbon, Portugal to London.
HMS Raven	Royal Navy	The Albatross-class sloop ran aground and was wrecked at the mouth of the Elbe.

=== 17 February ===
List of shipwrecks: 17 February 1798
Ship	State	Description
Enfant de la Patrie	French Navy	The Etna-class corvette was wrecked on the coast of Norway.

=== 25 February ===
List of shipwrecks: 25 February 1798
Ship	State	Description
General Eliott	Great Britain	Her crew abandoned the West Indiaman in the North Sea after she ran aground without loss of life on the Goodwin Sands, Kent during a voyage from Jamaica to London and was rescued by an unidentified vessel (Denmark–Norway). Later the frigate HMS Astraea and ship of the line HMS Veteran (both (Kingdom of Great Britain) Royal Navy), salvaged General Elliot and towed her in to Great Yarmouth, Norfolk.
Revanche	France	The privateer, a lugger, was sunk off Cromer, Norfolk, Great Britain by HM Hired armed ship Marquis of Coburg ( (Kingdom of Great Britain) ) Royal Navy with the loss of seven of her crew.

=== Unknown date ===
List of shipwrecks: Unknown date in February 1798
Ship	State	Description
Ceres	Great Britain	The ship foundered whilst bound for Lisbon, Portugal. Her crew were rescued.
Commerce	Great Britain	The ship foundered whilst on a voyage from Liverpool, Lancashire, to Edington.
Dudden	Great Britain	The ship was lost at Guernsey, Channel Isles. She was on a voyage from London to Guernsey.
Ebenezer	Great Britain	The ship was wrecked at Mountbatten, Plymouth, Devon.
Favourite	Great Britain	The ship was lost near Waterford, Ireland. Her crew were rescued. She was on a voyage from Liverpool to Waterford.
Favourite	Great Britain	The ship was wrecked at Bergen, Norway. She was on a voyage from Saint Petersburg, Russia to London.
Fly	Great Britain	The ship was lost near Holyhead, Anglesey. She was on a voyage from Youghall, County Cork, Ireland to Liverpool.
Gloman	Bremen	The ship was wrecked on Föhr, Duchy of Holstein. She was on a voyage from Bordeaux, Gironde, France to Bremen.
Griffin	Great Britain	The ship was driven ashore at Irvine, Ayrshire. She was on a voyage from Greenock, Renfrewshire, to Cork, Ireland.
Hope	Great Britain	The ship foundered whilst on a voyage from Weymouth, Dorset, to Liverpool.
James	Great Britain	The ship was wrecked on the French coast. She was on a voyage from Blakeney, Norfolk, to Plymouth.
Margarets	Great Britain	The ship was wrecked on Anticosti Island, Lower Canada, British America.
Maria Frederica	Bremen	The ship was lost on the coast of Holland. She was on a voyage from Liverpool to Bremen.
Mermaid	Great Britain	The ship sank at Weymouth.
Neptune	Great Britain	The ship capsized in the River Thames at Limehouse, Middlesex.
Nile	Great Britain	The ship was lost at Porto, Portugal.
Oporto Packet	Great Britain	War of the First Coalition: The ship was captured by a French privateer and sunk. She was on a voyage from Exeter, Devon, to São Miguel Island, Azores.
Peace & Plenty	Great Britain	The ship was driven ashore near Happisburg, Norfolk.
St. Nicholo	Grand Duchy of Tuscany	The ship was lost in the Mediterranean Sea. She was on a voyage from Livorno to Dublin, Ireland or Liverpool.
Venus	Great Britain	The ship was driven ashore near Waterford. She was on a voyage from Bristol, Gloucestershire, to Waterford.
Vrow Engelina	Hanover	The ship was driven ashore on Ameland, Friesland, Batavian Republic. She was on a voyage from Emden to London.
Unnamed	Hamburg	The ship was driven ashore in Mount's Bay.

== March ==
=== 7 March ===
List of shipwrecks: 7 March 1798
Ship	State	Description
Arendal	Danish Asiatic Company	The ship was destroyed by fire at Batavia, Netherlands East Indies.

=== Unknown date ===
List of shipwrecks: Unknown date in March 1798
Ship	State	Description
Alexander and Alexander	Batavian Republic	The ship was lost in the Swin. Her crew were rescued. She was on a voyage from Rotterdam. South Holland to London, Great Britain.
Holderness	Great Britain	The ship was lost on the Longsand, in the North Sea off the coast of Essex. She was on a voyage from South Shields, County Durham, to Gibraltar.
Iris	Great Britain	The ship was driven ashore and wrecked at Portsmouth, Hampshire. She was on a voyage from London to Portsmouth.
Mary	Great Britain	The ship collided with another vessel and foundered in the North Sea.
Thames	Great Britain	The ship was lost in Ballyshannon Bay, Ireland. Her crew were rescued. She was on a voyage from Cork to Limerick, Ireland.
Twee Gebroeders	Hanover	The ship was driven ashore at Hemsby, Norfolk, Great Britain. Her crew were rescued. She was on a voyage from Emden to London.

== April ==
=== 4 April ===
List of shipwrecks: 4 April 1798
Ship	State	Description
Blessed Endeavour	Great Britain	The whaler was wrecked on Fair Isle with the loss of three of her crew. She was on a voyage from Dunbar, Lothian, to Greenland.
HMS Pallas	(Kingdom of Great Britain) Royal Navy	The fifth rate frigate was driven ashore and wrecked at Plymouth, Devon, with the loss of a crew member and four crew of HMS Canada (Royal Navy), who were drowned when their boat capsized whilst they were attempting a rescue. Survivors were rescued by HMRC Busy (Great Britain).

=== 5 April ===
List of shipwrecks: 5 April 1798
Ship	State	Description
Princess Amelia	British East India Company	The East Indiaman was destroyed by fire at 14°01′N 74°19′E off Pigeon Island, India with the loss of about 40 lives.
Unnamed	Great Britain	The brig was driven ashore at Spithead, Hampshire.

=== 6 April ===
List of shipwrecks: 11 April 1798
Ship	State	Description
Unnamed	Great Britain	The brig foundered in the North Sea off the coast of County Durham. All aboard were rescued.

=== 11 April ===
List of shipwrecks: 11 April 1798
Ship	State	Description
Penryn	Great Britain	The ship departed St. Michael's Mount, Cornwall for London. No further trace, presumed foundered with the loss of all hands.

=== 12 April ===
List of shipwrecks: 12 April 1798
Ship	State	Description
HMS Lively	(Kingdom of Great Britain) Royal Navy	War of the Second Coalition: The fifth rate frigate ran aground at Rota, Spain. She was fired on by shore based artillery and was abandoned and set afire by her crew. HMS Seahorse ( (Kingdom of Great Britain) Royal Navy) rescued all but one of her crew.

=== 20 April ===
List of shipwrecks: 20 April 1798
Ship	State	Description
Woodcot	British East India Company	War of the Second Coalition: The East Indiaman was captured off Tellicherry, India by Preneuse (French Navy). Early reports that she had been sunk were incorrect.

=== 26 April ===
List of shipwrecks: 26 April 1798
Ship	State	Description
Fanny	Great Britain	War of the Second Coalition: The ship was captured and burnt by a French privateer. She was on a voyage from Bristol, Gloucestershire, to Newfoundland, British America.

=== Unknown date ===
List of shipwrecks: Unknown date in April 1798
Ship	State	Description
Aurora	Great Britain	The ship was destroyed by fire at "Ekerhaven", Norway.
Brothers	Ireland	The ship was lost whilst on a voyage from Galway to Londonderry. Her crew were rescued.
Duchess of York	Great Britain	The ship was wrecked off Portland Bill, Dorset with the loss of all hands.
Jenny	Great Britain	The ship was run down and sunk off Anholt, Denmark by a Prussian vessel. Her crew were rescued. She was on a voyage from Leith, Lothian, to Copenhagen, Denmark.
Mary	Great Britain	The ship was lost at Memel, Prussia.
Nancy	Great Britain	The ship was lost in Mevagissey Bay. She was on a voyage from Plymouth, Devon, to Falmouth, Cornwall.
Oporto Packet	Great Britain	The ship sprang a leak and foundered whilst on a voyage from Hull, Yorkshire to Porto, Portugal. Her crew were rescued.
Quatorze Juillet	France	The Téméraire-class ship of the line was destroyed by fire at Lorient, Morbihan, before commissioning.

== May ==
=== 11 May ===
List of shipwrecks: 11 May 1798
Ship	State	Description
"Hope"	United States	The schooner ran aground off Currituck, North Carolina while escorting/providing possible lifesaving service for the leaking Williamson. Was expected to be refloated.
"Williamson"	United States	The brig was wrecked on a reef off Currituck, North Carolina after springing a leak earlier. One crewmember, a boy, died.

=== 14 May ===
List of shipwrecks: 14 May 1798
Ship	State	Description
"Harmony"	United States	The schooner capsized and sank in a storm 9 days after leaving Surinam. 10 crewmen were lost, survivors rescued by "Betsy".

=== 23 May ===
List of shipwrecks: 23 May 1798
Ship	State	Description
HMS Braak	(Kingdom of Great Britain) Royal Navy	The brig-sloop capsized in Delaware Bay with the loss of 48 lives.

=== Unknown date ===
List of shipwrecks: Unknown date in May 1798
Ship	State	Description
Cicero	Great Britain	The ship was wrecked on the coast of Sweden. Her crew were rescued.
Eliza	Great Britain	The ship was driven ashore in the River Thames downstream of Gravesend, Kent. She was on a voyage from Tobago to London.
Success	Great Britain	War of the Second Coalition: The brig was captured and burnt by two French privateers.
Unnamed	France	Quasi War: Napoleonic Wars:The privateer was run ashore following a battle with an Anglo-American convoy in which 6 other privateers were captured, sometime in May.

== June ==
=== 23 June ===
List of shipwrecks: 23 June 1798
Ship	State	Description
HMS Rover	(Kingdom of Great Britain) Royal Navy	The sloop-of-war was wrecked on Cape Breton Island, Nova Scotia, British America. Her crew survived.

=== 28 June ===
List of shipwrecks: 28 June 1798
Ship	State	Description
Lion	Great Britain	The East Indiaman was condemned at Delagoa Bay. Three whalers were hired to take her cargo back to England.

=== 30 June ===
List of shipwrecks: 30 June 1798
Ship	State	Description
HMS Pique	(Kingdom of Great Britain) Royal Navy	War of the Second Coalition, Action of 30 June 1798: The fifth rate frigate was scuttled by burning off Brest, Finistère, France, following damage sustained in a battle with the frigate Seine (French Navy).

=== Unknown date ===
List of shipwrecks: Unknown date in June 1798
Ship	State	Description
Avon	Great Britain	The ship was driven ashore and wrecked on the north coast of Scotland. She was on a voyage from Bristol to Saint Petersburg, Russia.
Dolphin	Great Britain	The ship was driven ashore on Saltholm, Denmark.
Farmar	Great Britain	War of the Second Coalition: The ship was driven ashore on the coast of Jutland by a privateer. She was on a voyage from Newcastle upon Tyne, Northumberland to Gothenburg, Sweden.
Harlequin	(Kingdom of Great Britain) Jersey	The privateer was wrecked near Brest, Finistère, France.
Nancy	Great Britain	The ship foundered in the Baltic Sea. She was on a voyage from Danzig to London.
Providence	Great Britain	The ship was destroyed at Ross-on-Wye.

== July ==
=== 16 July ===
List of shipwrecks: 16 July 1798
Ship	State	Description
Akhill (Ахилл, 'Achilles')	Imperial Russian Navy	The ship capsized and sank in the Black Sea with the loss of all but one of her 76 crew.

=== 18 July ===
List of shipwrecks: 18 July 1798
Ship	State	Description
HMS Aigle	(Kingdom of Great Britain) Royal Navy	The frigate was wrecked on Plane Island, Cape Farina, Beylik of Tunis, Ottoman Empire.

=== 24 July ===
List of shipwrecks: 24 July 1798
Ship	State	Description
HMS Resistance	(Kingdom of Great Britain) Royal Navy	The fifth-rate caught fire and exploded in Bangka Strait. 332 people died; 13 survivors made a raft but only 4 succeeded in reaching Sumatra where they were enslaved by pirates but rescued later in the year.

=== 26 July ===
List of shipwrecks: 26 July 1798
Ship	State	Description
HMS Garland	(Kingdom of Great Britain) Royal Navy	The Enterprise-class frigate struck a rock and foundered in the Indian Ocean off Port Dauphiné, Madagascar. Her crew survived.

=== 29 July ===
List of shipwrecks: 29 July 1798
Ship	State	Description
Unanimity	South Carolina	The revenue brig was run ashore following an exchange of fire with HMS Musquito (Royal Navy) at Dewee's Inlet, South Carolina.

=== Unknown date ===
List of shipwrecks: Unknown date in July 1798
Ship	State	Description
Boreas	Russia	The ship foundered in the Kattegat. She was on a voyage from Pärnu to Liverpool, Lancashire, Great Britain.
Bristol Trader	Great Britain	The ship foundered in the Bristol Channel. She was on a voyage from Swansea, Glamorgan, to St. Ives, Cornwall.
Gustavus III	Sweden	The East Indiaman was driven ashore between Ramsgate and Deal, Kent, Great Britain. She was refloated on 12 July.
Hope	Great Britain	The ship was wrecked on the Goodwin Sands, Kent. Her crew were rescued.
Tinley	Great Britain	War of the Second Coalition: The ship was captured and burnt by a Spanish Man-of-War on or about 8 July. She was on a voyage from Saint-Domingue to London.
Unity	Great Britain	The ship foundered.

== August ==
=== 1 August ===
List of shipwrecks: 1 August 1798
Ship	State	Description
Mercure	French Navy	War of the Second Coalition, Battle of the Nile: The Séduisant-class ship of the line ran aground and was captured by HMS Alexander ( (Kingdom of Great Britain) Royal Navy. She was set afire and burnt.
Orient	French Navy	Orient. War of the Second Coalition, Battle of the Nile: The Océan-class ship of the line was set afire during the battle. She was destroyed by the explosion of her magazine with the loss of most of her crew.
Sérieuse	French Navy	Sérieuse War of the Second Coalition, Battle of the Nile: The Magicienne-class frigate was sunk due to damage inflicted by HMS Orion ( (Kingdom of Great Britain) Royal Navy).

=== 2 August ===
List of shipwrecks: 2 August 1798
Ship	State	Description
Artémise	French Navy	War of the Second Coalition, Battle of the Nile: The Magicienne-class frigate was set afire and scuttled to prevent capture by the Royal Navy.
Guerrier	French Navy	War of the Second Coalition, Battle of the Nile: The Magnifique-class ship of the line was captured by the Royal Navy. She was so severely damaged in the battle that she was set afire and destroyed.
Heureux	French Navy	War of the Second Coalition, Battle of the Nile: The Centare-class ship of the line ship of the line was captured by the Royal Navy. She was so severely damaged in the battle that she was set afire and destroyed.
Timoléon	French Navy	War of the Second Coalition, Battle of the Nile: The Téméraire-class ship of the line ship of the line ran aground during the battle. She was set afire and exploded.

=== 4 August ===
List of shipwrecks: 4 August 1798
Ship	State	Description
Canada	Great Britain	War of the Second Coalition: The ship, a prize of the privateer Heureux (France), was recaptured by HMS Indefatigable ( (Kingdom of Great Britain) Royal Navy) and was run ashore and wrecked near Bayonne, Basses-Pyrénées, France. Canada was on a voyage from Jamaica to London.

=== 21 August ===
List of shipwrecks: 21 August 1798
Ship	State	Description
Bee	(Kingdom of Great Britain) Jersey	The ship was wrecked on the coast of Labrador, British America.

=== 25 August ===
List of shipwrecks: 25 August 1798
Ship	State	Description
HMS Etrusco	(Kingdom of Great Britain) Royal Navy	The stores ship foundered. Her crew were rescued. She was on a voyage from Saint Vincent to London.
Nancy	Great Britain	War of the Second Coalition: The ship was captured and burnt off Tory Island, County Donegal, Ireland by three French frigates. She was on a voyage from Virginia, United States to Glasgow, Renfrewshire.
Spooner	Great Britain	The ship foundered in the Atlantic Ocean with the loss of six lives. She was on a voyage from Tobago to London.

=== 27 August ===
List of shipwrecks: 25 August 1798
Ship	State	Description
HMS Beaulieu	Royal Navy	War of the First Coalition: The fifth rate ran aground at Le Havre, Seine-Inférieure, France. She was engaged with HMS Adamant,HMS Cynthia, HMS Indefatigable and HMS Niger (all Royal Navy) in preventing Comète, Indian, Libre, Revanche, Serpent, Vésuve and Vulcan (all French Navy) from leaving Le Havre. She was refloatd.

== September ==
=== 7 September ===
List of shipwrecks: 7 September 1798
Ship	State	Description
Dolly	Great Britain	The ship capsized and sank. Her crew were rescued. She was on a voyage from Jamaica to New York, United States.

=== 11 September ===
List of shipwrecks: 11 September 1798
Ship	State	Description
Charlotte	Great Britain	The ship was lost on the coast of Labrador, British America.

=== 12 September ===
List of shipwrecks: 12 September 1798
Ship	State	Description
Alyans (Альянс, 'Alliance')	Imperial Russian Navy	The transport ship ran aground off sv:Korkeussaari and was beached and subsequently wrecked on sv:Pakaskari in the Gulf of Finland. Her crew were rescued. She was on a voyage from Kotka to Hamina, Old Finland.
Friendship	Great Britain	The ship was run down and sunk in the North Sea off Flamborough Head, Yorkshire by Bacchus Her crew were rescued.

=== 20 September ===
List of shipwrecks: 20 September 1798
Ship	State	Description
Esther	Great Britain	The ship foundered in the North Sea off Montrose, Forfarshire whilst on a voyage from Saint Petersburg, Russia to Montrose.

=== 21 September ===
List of shipwrecks: 21 September 1798
Ship	State	Description
Eliza	Great Britain	The ship was wrecked on Grand Cayman. Her crew were rescued. She was on a voyage from the "Western Islands" to Saint-Domingue.

=== 23 September ===
List of shipwrecks: 23 September 1798
Ship	State	Description
Svyatoy Nikolay (Святой Николай, 'St. Nicholas')	Imperial Russian Navy	The transport ship ran aground and was wrecked while crossing the river mouth bar of the Northern Dvina, with the loss of five lives.

=== 25 September ===
List of shipwrecks: 25 September 1798
Ship	State	Description
Ann	Great Britain	The transport ship was driven ashore and wrecked at Halifax, Nova Scotia, British America.
Bernstorff	Denmark	The ship, a prize, was driven ashore and damaged at Halifax.
Duncan	Great Britain	The ship was driven ashore and damaged at Halifax. She was on a voyage from Halifax to London.
Elizabeth	(Kingdom of Great Britain) British America	The ship was driven ashore and damaged at Halifax.
Freemason	United States	The ship was driven ashore and damaged at Halifax.
Henrietta	United States	The ship was driven ashore and damaged at Halifax.
Liberty	United States	The ship was driven ashore and damaged at Halifax.
Little Mary	United States	The ship was driven ashore and damaged at Halifax.
Matilda	(Kingdom of Great Britain) British America	The ship was driven ashore and damaged at Halifax.
Prince Edward	(Kingdom of Great Britain) British America	The ship was driven ashore and damaged at Halifax.
Sally	(Kingdom of Great Britain) British America	The schooner was driven ashore and damaged at Halifax.
William	United States	The ship was driven ashore and damaged at Halifax.

=== 27 September ===
List of shipwrecks: 27 September 1798
Ship	State	Description
"Tryal"	United States	Quasi War:The brig was sunk after entering Bayonne, France, mistaking it for Bilbao, Spain.

=== 28 September ===
List of shipwrecks: 28 September 1798
Ship	State	Description
Fame	Great Britain	The ship was wrecked near Banff, Aberdeenshire. She was on a voyage from Saint Petersburg, Russia to Liverpool, Lancashire.

=== Unknown date ===
List of shipwrecks: Unknown date in September 1798
Ship	State	Description
Albion	Great Britain	The ship was driven ashore near Hoylake, Cheshire. She was on a voyage from Virginia, United States to Liverpool, Lancashire.
Amity	Great Britain	The ship was driven ashore at Gothenburg, Sweden.
Ann	Great Britain	The ship was driven ashore near King's Lynn, Norfolk. She was on a voyage from Saint Petersburg, Russia to London.
Castor	Great Britain	The ship was driven ashore and wrecked in the River Thames at Cuckold's Point, Surrey. She was on a voyage from London to Grenada.
Enterprize	Great Britain	The ship was lost in the Gulf of Finland. She was on a voyage from Hull to Saint Petersburg.
Esther	Great Britain	The ship was lost at Montrose, Forfarshire. She was on a voyage from Saint Petersburg to Montrose.
George	Great Britain	The ship foundered in the Baltic Sea off Saaremaa, Russia whilst on a voyage from Saint Petersburg to London.
Goede Hoop	Batavian Republic	The ship was wrecked on Ameland, Friesland with the loss of all but one of her crew. She was on a voyage from London to Emden, Hanover.
Hazard	Great Britain	The ship was wrecked on the coast of Holland.
Integrity	Great Britain	The ship was wrecked on the Sandhammer Reef. She was on a voyage from London to Saint Petersburg.
Kitty	Great Britain	The ship was lost near the Saltee Islands, County Wexford, Ireland. Her crew were rescued. She was on a voyage from Liverpool to Africa.
Lark	Great Britain	The ship was driven ashore on "Smithr Steert". Her crew were rescued. She was on a voyage from London to Bremen.
Martin	Great Britain	The ship was driven ashore in the Weser. She was on a voyage from London to Hamburg.
Polaskie	Hamburg	The ship was driven ashore near Cuxhaven. She was on a voyage from New York, United States to Hamburg.
Racehorse	Great Britain	The ship was driven ashore at Lowestoft, Suffolk.
Richard and Ann	Great Britain	The ship was driven ashore at Southsea, Hampshire. She was on a voyage from Cork, Ireland to London.
Sea Gull	Great Britain	The ship was wrecked off Plymouth, Devon.
Sophia	Great Britain	The ship eas driven ashore near Castletown, Isle of Man. She was on a voyage from Liverpool to a Baltic port.
Two Brothers	Great Britain	The ship was driven ashore near Swansea, Glamorgan. She was on a voyage from Boston, Massachusetts, United States to Cork and Bristol, Gloucestershire.
Two Sisters	Ireland	The ship was wrecked on Rathlin Island, County Antrim on Sept 12,1798, Capt Jones. She was on a voyage from New York, United States to Belfast, County Antrim.

== October ==
=== 4 October ===
List of shipwrecks: 4 October 1798
Ship	State	Description
Prins Gustaf	Imperial Russian Navy	The ship of the line foundered off "Drommel", Norway. Her crew survived.
Royal Recovery	Ireland	The ship was run down and sunk in the Sound of Isla. She was on a voyage from Belfast, County Antrim, to Hamburg.

=== 7 October ===
List of shipwrecks: 7 October 1798
Ship	State	Description
"Amphitrite"	United States	The schooner was wrecked on the Isle of Avis in the Caribbean Sea while sailing from Grenada to Curaçao. She was stripped by privateer "Fleur de la Mer" (France) on 21 October, rescuing/capturing most of her crew.

=== 13 October ===
List of shipwrecks: 13 October 1798
Ship	State	Description
HMS Jason	(Kingdom of Great Britain) Royal Navy	The Artois-class frigate struck a rock in the Bay of Biscay off Brest, Finistère, France and foundered. Her crew were rescued; six of them took to a jolly boat and were rescued by the brig Speculator (Denmark).
Fyodor Stratilat (Фёдор Стратилат, 'Theodore Stratelates')	Imperial Russian Navy	The Pyotr Apostol-class frigate sank at the mouth of the Danube with the loss of 269 of her 392 crew.

=== 15 October ===
List of shipwrecks: 15 October 1798
Ship	State	Description
Tsar Konstantin (Царь Константин)	Imperial Russian Navy	The Pyotr Apostol-class frigate sank at the mouth of the Danube with the loss of all but 9 of her 408 crew.

=== 28 October ===
List of shipwrecks: 28 October 1798
Ship	State	Description
Dolphin	Great Britain	The ship departed from Bristol, Gloucestershire, for Dublin, Ireland. No further trace, presumed foundered in the Irish Sea with the loss of all hands.

=== 30 October ===
List of shipwrecks: 30 October 1798
Ship	State	Description
Prints Gustaf	Imperial Russian Navy	The battleship ran aground in the "Gulf of Ekvog". Her crew were rescued on 4 November by Izyaslav (Imperial Russian Navy and she sank.

=== 31 October ===
List of shipwrecks: 31 October 1798
Ship	State	Description
William and Mary	Great Britain	The ship was wrecked in Tramore Bay. She was on a voyage from Cork, Ireland to Liverpool, Lancashire.

=== Unknown date ===
List of shipwrecks: Unknown date in October 1798
Ship	State	Description
Active	Great Britain	The ship was driven ashore and severely damaged at Cork, Ireland. She was on a voyage from Liverpool, Lancashire, to Martinique.
Barbara	Great Britain	The ship was wrecked on Bornholm, Denmark.
Bess	Great Britain	The ship foundered in the Atlantic Ocean. She was on a voyage from Liverpool to Martinique.
Catharina Margaretta	Sweden	The ship was lost on the Longsand. She was on a voyage from Stockholm to London, Great Britain.
Charlotte	Great Britain	The ship was lost at Memel, Prussia.
Cicero	Great Britain	The ship was wrecked near Wexford, Ireland. She was on a voyage from Liverpool to North Carolina, United States.
Cleopatra	Great Britain	The ship was lost on the north coast of Ireland. She was on a voyage from Stettin to Liverpool.
Diana	Great Britain	The ship was driven ashore in the River Thames at Cuckold's Point, Surrey. She was on a voyage from London to Boston. She was later refloated.
Dolly	Great Britain	The ship foundered in the Kattegat. She was on a voyage from London to Memel.
Fame	Great Britain	The ship was driven ashore near Donaghadee, County Down, Ireland. She was on a voyage from Greenock, Renfrewshire, to Liverpool.
Fortitude	Great Britain	The ship was lost in Riga Bay. She was on a voyage from Riga, Russia to Lisbon, Portugal.
Friends	Great Britain	The ship was lost in the White Sea with the loss of all but two of her crew. She was on a voyage from Arkhangelsk, Russia to Hull.
Happy Enterprize	Great Britain	The ship was lost in the Baltic. She was on a voyage from Liverpool to "Wyburg".
Hardman	Great Britain	The ship was lost in the Baltic. She was on a voyage from Hull to Saint Petersburg, Russia.
Hope	Great Britain	The ship was driven ashore near Great Yarmouth, Norfolk. She was on a voyage from Deal, Kent, to Sunderland, County Durham.
Kingston	United States	The ship was wrecked on the Isle of Arran, Scotland. She was on a voyage from Saint Petersburg, Russia to New York.
Mercurius	Hamburg	The ship was lost on the Whitesand. She was on a voyage from Charleston, South Carolina, United States to Hamburg.
Peggy	Great Britain	The ship was driven ashore at Liverpool. She was on a voyage from Liverpool to Bremen.
Shields	Great Britain	The ship was severely damaged by fire at Chatham, Kent.
St. Constantine	Russia	The ship was driven ashore near Banff, Aberdeenshire, Great Britain. She was on a voyage from Saint Petersburg to Liverpool.
Tillstone	Great Britain	The ship was destroyed by fire off Bornholm. She was on a voyage from Saint Petersburg to Liverpool.
Twee Bruders	Hamburg	The ship was lost near Vlieland, Friesland, Batavian Republic. She was on a voyage from Hamburg to Saint Thomas, Virgin Islands.
Tyger	Great Britain	The ship was driven ashore and wrecked in the River Thames at Pitcher's Point, Middlesex. She was on a voyage from Arkhangelsk, Russia to London
Vigilante	France	War of the Second Coalition: The privateer was captured and sunk in the English Channel off Dover, Kent, Great Britain by HMS Racoon ( (Kingdom of Great Britain) Royal Navy).
Vriendschap	Batavian Republic	The ship struck an anchor and sank in the River Thames. She was on a voyage from London to Amsterdam, North Holland.

== November ==
=== 1 November ===
List of shipwrecks: 1 November 1798
Ship	State	Description
North Star	United States	The ship foundered in the North Sea. Her crew were rescued by Carlisle (Great Britain). North Star was on a voyage from Hamburg to Charleston, South Carolina.
Unnamed	France	The privateer was wrecked in Bigbury Bay with the loss of six of her 140 crew. Two people were reported missing.

=== 2 November ===
List of shipwrecks: 2 November 1798
Ship	State	Description
Athletic	Great Britain	The ship was wrecked on the Gunfleet Sand, in the North Sea off the coast of Essex. Her crew were rescued. She was on a voyage from South Shields, County Durham, to London.

=== 3 November ===
List of shipwrecks: 3 November 1798
Ship	State	Description
HSwMS Draken	Swedish Navy	The sloop-of-war, a brig, was wrecked in Bigbury Bay with the loss of six of her 106 crew. Survivors were rescued by the Surrey Yeomanry, who subsequently prevented the wreck from being looted by the local inhabitants.

=== 5 November ===
List of shipwrecks: 5 November 1798
Ship	State	Description
Unnamed	Flag unknown	The ship foundered in the North Sea 16 nautical miles (30 km) north east of Great Yarmouth, Norfolk, Great Britain. Her crew were rescued. She was on a voyage from Hamburg to a port in South Carolina, United States.

=== 9 November ===
List of shipwrecks: 9 November 1798
Ship	State	Description
Doves	Great Britain	The ship foundered in the Atlantic Ocean. Her crew were rescued. She was on a voyage from Lisbon, Portugal to Halifax, Nova Scotia, British North America.

=== 20 November ===
List of shipwrecks: 20 November 1798
Ship	State	Description
launch and pinnace	United States Navy	In a storm the pinnace belonging to USS Constitution drifted out to sea from Hampton Roads and was lost, and her launch sank at dock in Norfolk, Virginia. Launch brought up on the 22nd.

=== 22 November ===
List of shipwrecks: 22 November 1798
Ship	State	Description
HMS Medusa	(Kingdom of Great Britain) Royal Navy	The fourth rate was driven ashore and wrecked at Gibraltar.
Two unnamed vessels	Flags unknown	The ships were driven ashore at Clontarf, County Dublin, Ireland.
Two unnamed vessels	Flags unknown	The ships ran aground on the North Bull, in the Irish Sea off the coast of County Dublin. One of them capsized with the loss of fourteen lives.
Unnamed	Great Britain	The sloop sank in the River Liffey.

=== 24 November ===
List of shipwrecks: 24 November 1798
Ship	State	Description
Alert	Great Britain	The ship was driven ashore and wrecked at Black Rock, County Dublin, Ireland.

=== Unknown date ===
List of shipwrecks: Unknown date in November 1798
Ship	State	Description
Abbey	Great Britain	The ship was driven ashore near Dublin, Ireland.
Active	Great Britain	The ship was driven ashore near Dublin. She was on a voyage from Liverpool, Lancashire, to Dublin.
Active	Ireland	The ship was driven ashore at Waterford. she was on a voyage from Dublin to Martinique.
Alert	Great Britain	The ship was lost whilst on a voyage from Newfoundland to Halifax, British America.
American	United States	The ship was wrecked on the coast of Wales. She was on a voyage from Saint Barthélemy to Stockholm, Sweden.
Bee	Ireland	The ship was driven ashore at Cork before 17 November.
Betsey	Great Britain	The ship was lost at "Sibersness", on the Baltic coast.
Boyd	Great Britain	The ship was driven ashore near the Old Head of Kinsale, County Cork, Ireland. She was on a voyage from Bristol, Gloucestershire, to Cork.
Britannia	Great Britain	The ship was driven ashore and wrecked at Bamborough, Northumberland. She was on a voyage from Newcastle upon Tyne, Northumberland to London.
Castor	Ireland	The ship was driven ashore at Cork before 17 November.
Christiana Maria	Denmark	The ship was wrecked on Anholt. She was on a voyage from London, Great Britain to a Baltic port.
Countess of Cardigan	Great Britain	The ship was driven ashore in Stokes Bay. She was on a voyage from Saint Petersburg, Russia to Lisbon, Portugal. She was later refloated.
Eliza	Great Britain	The ship was driven ashore at Cobh, County Cork. She was on a voyage from Liverpool to Martinique.
Elizabeth	Great Britain	The ship was lost near Falmouth, Cornwall. She was on a voyage from Plymouth, Devon, to Lisbon, Portugal.
Elizabeth	Great Britain	The ship was wrecked on the South Rock. She waws on a voyage from Liverpool to Londonderry, Ireland.
Four Friends	Great Britain	War of the Second Coalition: The sloop was captured by the privateer Cameleon (France) but was subsequently wrecked off Beachy Head, Sussex.
Friends Goodwill	Great Britain	The ship was driven ashore and wrecked near Rye, Sussex, with the loss of all but one of her crew. She was on a voyage from Southampton, Hampshire, to Sunderland, County Durham.
Goodintent	Great Britain	The ship was driven ashore and wrecked at Great Yarmouth, Norfolk. Her crew were rescued.
Goodintent	Great Britain	The ship was driven ashore at Kingsbridge, Devon. She was on a voyage from London to Newry, County Antrim, Ireland.
Hannah	Great Britain	The ship was wrecked on the Vogel Sand, in the North Sea. She was on a voyage from London to Hamburg.
Hebe	Great Britain	The ship was wrecked on the Revel Stone. She was on a voyage from Hull, Yorkshire to Saint Petersburg.
Henry	Great Britain	The ship was driven ashore and wrecked at Dublin. She was on a voyage from London to Liverpool.
Hero	Great Britain	The ship was driven ashore and wrecked on Islay. She was on a voyage from Quebec City, Lower Canada, British America to Greenock, Renfrewshire.
Hope	Great Britain	The ship was wrecked at Formby, Lancashire. She was on a voyage from Liverpool to Dartmouth, Devon.
Isabella	Great Britain	The ship was driven ashore at Great Yarmouth.
Jay	United States	The ship was driven ashore and wrecked on the coast of County Wexford, Ireland. She was on a voyage from America to Liverpool.
John & Betsey	Great Britain	The ship ran aground on the North Bull, in the Irish Sea off Dublin. She was later refloated.
Kent	Great Britain	The ship was wrecked on the north coast of Ireland. she was on a voyage from Glasgow, Renfrewshire, to Jamaica.
Llandovery	Great Britain	The ship was driven ashore and capsized on the Isle of Lewis, Outer Hebrides. She was on a voyage from Arkhangelsk, Russia to Liverpool.
Louisa Augusta	(Denmark) Norway	The ship was wrecked on the Haisborough Sands, in the North Sea off the coast of Norfolk. Her crew were rescued. She was on a voyage from Christiania to London.
Margaret	Great Britain	The tender was lost near "Ballyconnel", Ireland.
Martin	Great Britain	The ship foundered in the North Sea off Pakefield, Suffolk. Her crew were rescued. She was on a voyage from Danzig to London.
Mary	Great Britain	The ship was wrecked on "Derreary Point", Ireland. She was on a voyage from Liverpool to Africa.
Nancy	Great Britain	The ship was driven ashore at Great Yarmouth. She was on a voyage from Saint Petersburg to Lisbon, Portugal.
Phœbe	Great Britain	The ship foundered in the Baltic Sea. Her crew were rescued. She was on a voyage from Saint Petersburg to Hull.
Protecteur	Portugal	The ship was destroyed by an explosion at Porto.
Providence	Great Britain	The ship was lost near Liverpool. She was on a voyage from Glasgow to Cork.
Richmond	Ireland	The ship was driven ashore near Dublin. She was on a voyage from Dublin to Jamaica.
Robinson	Great Britain	The ship ran aground on the North Bull.
Rose	Great Britain	The ship was wrecked in Bigbury Bay. Her crew were rescued. She was on a voyage from Bristol to Plymouth.
Sarah	Great Britain	The ship was lost near Newry. She was on a voyage from Liverpool to Africa.
Saratoga	United States	The ship departed from Charleston, South Carolina, for London. No further trace, presumed foundered in the Atlantic Ocean with the loss of all hands.
Shortland	Great Britain	The ship was driven ashore at Dublin. She was on a voyage from Plymouth to Liverpool.
Speculation	Ireland	The ship was lost on Tory Island, County Donegal. She was on a voyage from Porto to Sligo.
Star	Great Britain	The ship was driven ashore at Great Yarmouth. She was on a voyage from London to Sunderland.
Thomas and Ann	Great Britain	The ship was driven ashore near Kingsbridge, Devon.
Thomas and Sally	Great Britain	The ship was lost near Newry, County Antrim. she was on a voyage from Liverpool to Newry.
Three Sisters	Great Britain	The ship was wrecked on the Haisborough Sands. Her crew were rescued. She was on a voyage from Leith, Lothian, to Littlehampton, Sussex.
Unnamed	Sweden	The ship was driven ashore at Baltimore, County Cork She was on a voyage from St. Ube's. Portugal to Cork.

== December ==
=== 3 December ===
List of shipwrecks: 3 December 1798
Ship	State	Description
HMS Kingfisher	(Kingdom of Great Britain) Royal Navy	The sloop-of-war ran aground and was wrecked at the mouth of the Tagus.

=== 7 December ===
List of shipwrecks: 7 December 1798
Ship	State	Description
Silver Eel	Great Britain	The ship was driven ashore and wrecked at the Saltfleet, Lincolnshire whilst on a voyage from Riga, Russia to Deptford, Kent. Her crew were rescued. Silver Eel was refloated in July 1799 and taken in to Hull, Yorkshire.

=== 8 December ===
List of shipwrecks: 8 December 1798
Ship	State	Description
Augusta	Great Britain	The ship foundered in the Atlantic Ocean. Her crew were rescued. She was on a voyage from Barbados to Liverpool, Lancashire.

=== 9 December ===
List of shipwrecks: 9 December 1798
Ship	State	Description
Henry Addington	British East India Company	During a voyage from London to India and China, the East Indiaman was wrecked in heavy fog on the Bembridge Ledge on the Isle of Wight. She bilged the next day and was abandoned. Six members of her crew died while abandoning ship.
Unnamed	United States	The coastal vessel was driven ashore on Portland Head, Maine and wrecked. Crew made it to shore safely.

=== 10 December ===
List of shipwrecks: 10 December 1798
Ship	State	Description
HMS Colossus	(Kingdom of Great Britain) Royal Navy	The third rate ship-of-the-line was driven ashore on Samson, Isles of Scilly and was wrecked with the loss of a crew member.

=== 11 December ===
List of shipwrecks: 11 December 1798
Ship	State	Description
Thames	Great Britain	The West Indiaman was wrecked at Portsmouth, Hampshire, or Selsea, Sussex. She was on a voyage from London to Grenada.
Unnamed	Flag unknown	The brig was driven ashore at Great Yarmouth, Norfolk, Great Britain. Her crew were rescued. She was on a voyage from Hamburg to Lisbon, Portugal.

=== 12 December ===
List of shipwrecks: 12 December 1798
Ship	State	Description
Mary & Betsey	Great Britain	The sloop was abandoned by her crew and subsequently wrecked in the Isles of Scilly.

=== 14 December ===
List of shipwrecks: 14 December 1798
Ship	State	Description
HMS Coquille	(Kingdom of Great Britain) Royal Navy	The Coquille-class frigate caught fire, exploded and sank at Plymouth, Devon, with the loss of thirteen of her crew and two civilians.
Endeavour	Great Britain	The brig was destroyed by fire following the loss of HMS Coquille ( (Kingdom of Great Britain) Royal Navy). Her crew were rescued.
Thetis	Great Britain	The ship was wrecked on the Arklow Banks, in the Irish Sea off County Wicklow, Ireland. She was on a voyage from London to Dublin, Ireland.

=== 20 December ===
List of shipwrecks: 20 December 1798
Ship	State	Description
Amelia	Great Britain	The ship departed from Charleston, South Carolina, for the Clyde. No further trace, presumed foundered in the Atlantic Ocean with the loss of all hands.

=== 25 December ===
List of shipwrecks: 25 December 1798
Ship	State	Description
Unnamed	Batavian Republic	The ship was driven ashore and wrecked near Lowestoft, Suffolk, Great Britain. Her crew were rescued.

=== Unknown date ===
List of shipwrecks: Unknown date in December 1798
Ship	State	Description
Admiral Stromfeldt	Sweden	The ship was destroyed by fire whilst on a voyage from Livorno, Grand Duchy of Tuscany to London, Great Britain.
Ann	Great Britain	The ship was driven ashore at Hornsea, Yorkshire.
Betsey	Great Britain	The ship was driven ashore on the White Rocks.
Carl Frederick	Danzig	The ship was wrecked in the Shetland Islands, Great Britain. She was on a voyage from Liverpool, Lancashire, Great Britain to Danzig.
Centurion	Great Britain	The ship was driven ashore near Bridlington, Yorkshire.
Charlotte	Ireland	The ship was lost off Cork before 28 December. There was one survivor. She was on a voyage from London to Chester, Cheshire.
Courteney	Great Britain	The ship departed from Newfoundland, British America for the West Indies. No further trace, presumed foundered in the Atlantic Ocean with the loss of all hands.
Dart	Great Britain	The ship lost near Calais, France. She was on a voyage from Leith, Lothian, to Livorno, Grand Duchy of Tuscany.
Dispatch	Great Britain	The ship was driven ashore near Kinsale County Cork, Ireland before 6 December. She was on a voyage from Barnstaple, Devon, to Cork.
Edwards	Great Britain	The ship was driven ashore on the Holderness coast, Yorkshire. She was on a voyage from Memel, Prussia to Bridlington.
Elizabeth	Great Britain	The ship foundered whilst on a voyage from Bristol, Gloucestershire, to Guernsey, Channel Islands.
Enterprize	Great Britain	The ship was driven ashore at Dundalk, County Louth, Ireland. she was on a voyage from Lisbon, Portugal to Liverpool.
Fairy	Great Britain	The ship was wrecked on the Goodwin Sands, Kent. Her crew were rescued. She was on a voyage from Saint Petersburg to Lisbon.
Faith	Great Britain	The ship was driven ashore near Flamborough Head, Yorkshire. Five of her crew were rescued. She was on a voyage from Saint Petersburg to London.
Fredericksburg	Danish Asiatic Company	The East Indiaman was wrecked on the Diamond Sand. She was on a voyage from Bengal, India to Copenhagen.
Friends Goodwill	Great Britain	The ship was driven ashore at Corton, Suffolk. Her crew were rescued.
Friendship	Great Britain	War of the Second Coalition: The ship was captured and burnt by the privateer Invincible Buonaparte (France). She was on a voyage from St. Ubes, Portugal to Falmouth, Cornwall.
Gute Erwarting	Hamburg	The ship was driven ashore and wrecked on the Isle of Wight, Great Britain. She was on a voyage from Porto, Portugal to Hamburg.
Harriot	Great Britain	The ship was lost near Newry, County Antrim. Her crew were rescued. She was on a voyage from Liverpool to Londonderry, Ireland.
Hero	Great Britain	The ship was lost at Gibraltar.
James	Great Britain	The ship was destroyed by fire at Memel.
John & Martha	Great Britain	The ship was driven ashore and wrecked at Plymouth, Devon.
Jong Christian	Flag unknown	The ship was driven ashore at Herne Bay, Kent. She was on a voyage from Dénia, Spain to Llondon.
Jonge Fredericks	Flag unknown	The ship was driven ashore at Aldeburgh, Suffolk, Great Britain.
Juffrow Johanna	Flag unknown	The ship was lost near Lowestoft, Suffolk.
Konningine Louisa Van Prussia	Hanover	The ship was wrecked on the Isle of Man. She was on a voyage from Emden to Liverpool.
Lucretia	Great Britain	The ship was lost at Islay. She was on a voyage from Liverpool to America.
Mariam	Great Britain	The transport ship foundered in the Atlantic Ocean whilst on a voyage from the West Indies to London. Her crew were rescued by Elizabeth (Great Britain).
Mercury	Great Britain	The ship foundered in the Atlantic Ocean off The Rosses, County Donegal, Ireland with the loss of all hands. She was on a voyage from the Bahamas to London.
Morgenstern	Danzig	The ship was lost on the coast of Norway. She was on a voyage from London to Danzig.
Nova Aurora	Portugal	The ship foundered off Porto whilst on a voyage from Porto to Rio de Janeiro, Viceroyalty of the Río de la Plata.
Ocean	Great Britain	The ship was lost near Fowey, Cornwall. She was on a voyage from Plymouth to Liverpool.
Peace and Plenty	Great Britain	The ship was lost near Portpatrick, Wigtownshire. She was on a voyage from Dublin to Saltcoats, Ayrshire.
Phillippina	Denmark	The ship foundered off Cleve, Norway with the loss of all but two of her crew. She was on a voyage from St. Croix to Copenhagen.
Providence	Great Britain	The ship was driven ashore on the Holderness coast. She was on a voyage from Saint Petersburg to London.
Providence	Great Britain	The ship was lost near Plymouth. She was on a voyage from Milford, Pembrokeshire to Portsmouth, Hampshire.
Recovery	Great Britain	The ship was driven ashore and severely damaged at Guernsey, Channel Islands. She was on a voyage from Guernsey to Bristol.
St. Andrew	Great Britain	The ship was lost near Whitby, Yorkshire. She was on a voyage from Bergen, Norway to Dort, South Holland, Batavian Republic.
Success	Great Britain	The ship was driven ashore at Great Yarmouth, Norfolk. She was on a voyage from Great Yarmouth to Milton.
Superb	Great Britain	The ship was driven ashore near Dublin. She was on a voyage from London to Dublin.
Tarleton	Great Britain	The ship was wrecked at Cape Palmas, Pepper Coast.
Teutonia	Hamburg	The ship was wrecked at Great Yarmouth. Her crew were rescued. She was on a voyage from Hamburg to Lisbon.
Thomas	Great Britain	The ship foundered with the loss of all hands. She was on a voyage from Liverpool to Teignmouth, Devon.
Two Friends	Great Britain	The ship foundered off Lisbon whilst on a voyage from Gibraltar to London with the loss of four of her crew.
Three Sisters	Great Britain	The ship was driven ashore near Portland, Dorset. She was on a voyage from Bridport, Dorset, to Sunderland, County Durham.
Unity	Great Britain	The ship was driven ashore on Norderney, Hanover. She was on a voyage from London to Hamburg.
Unnamed	France	War of the Second Coalition:The privateer was sunk by HMS Amphitrite, probably in early December.
Young Christian	Great Britain	The ship was lost at Margate, Kent. Her crew were rescued.

== Unknown date ==
List of shipwrecks: Unknown date in 1798
Ship	State	Description
Active	United States	The ship foundered whilst on a voyage from Philadelphia, Pennsylvania, to New Orleans, Louisiana, New Spain.
Adventure	Great Britain	The ship foundered whilst on a voyage from Liverpool, Lancashire, to Africa with the loss of all hands.
Africa	Great Britain	War of the Second Coalition: The ship was captured and burnt by Décade (French Navy). She was on a voyage from Madeira to Quebec City, Lower Canada, British America.
Amphion	United States	The ship foundered in the Atlantic Ocean. Her crew were rescued by Lady Harriot (Great Britain). Amphion was on a voyage from New York to Hamburg.
Anthony Mangia	United States	The ship was lost near Cape Charles, Virginia. She was on a voyage from Hamburg to Baltimore, Maryland.
Ark	Great Britain	The ship foundered whilst on a voyage from Biddiford, Devon to Newfoundland, British America.
Aurora	United States	The ship was lost on "Monasquan Beach". She was on a voyage from Jamaica to New York.
Aurora	Great Britain	The troopship was driven ashore and wrecked at Old Harbour, Jamaica.
Betsey	Great Britain	The stores ship was destroyed by fire at Barbados. She was on a voyage from London to Jamaica.
Betsey	Great Britain	The whaler was wrecked on South Georgia.
Betsey	Great Britain	The ship was lost near Saint Pierre. She was on a voyage from Gaspeé, Lower Canada, British America to Portugal.
Betty	Great Britain	War of the Second Coalition: The ship was captured and burnt by the French. She was on a voyage from Liverpool to Dublin, Ireland and Antigua.
Bonetta	Great Britain	The ship foundered whilst on a voyage from Liverpool to Africa. Her crew were rescued by a whaler.
Britannia	Great Britain	The ship was wrecked in New Brunswick, British America. Her crew were rescued.
Brothers	Great Britain	The ship was wrecked on the Tusker Rock. Her ten crew were rescued.
Carleton	Great Britain	The ship was lost near Jack's Bay. She was on a voyage from New Brunswick, British America, to Jamaica.
Ceres	Great Britain	The ship sprang a leak and foundered in the Atlantic Ocean. Her crew were rescued by HMS Agincourt ( (Kingdom of Great Britain) Royal Navy). Ceres was on a voyage from London to Halifax, Nova Scotia, British America.
Chance	Great Britain	The ship was destroyed by fire. She was on a voyage from Jamaica to Leith, Lothian.
Commerce	Great Britain	The ship was wrecked on the Nantucket Shoals.
Cornelia	United States	The ship was lost at Jérémie, Saint-Domingue. She was on a voyage from Saint-Domingue to Charleston, South Carolina.
De Braak	Great Britain	The privateer sank off Cape Henlopen, Delaware, United States.
Delight	Great Britain	The ship was wrecked near Cape Cod, Massachusetts, United States. She was on a voyage from Virginia to London.
Dispatch	Ireland	The ship was wrecked on the Jersey Shore, United States. She was on a voyage from Dublin to Philadelphia, Pennsylvania.
Edward	Great Britain	The whaler was lost on South Georgia.
Eliza	Great Britain	War of the Second Coalition The ship exploded and sank whilst engaging privateers off Barbados. There were six to eight survivors. Eliza was on a voyage from Africa to the West Indies.
Elizabeth	United States	The ship was wrecked on a reef. She was on a voyage from New York to Grenada.
Flora	Great Britain	The ship was wrecked on the Florida Keys whilst on a voyage from Charleston, South Carolina to Havana, Cuba.
Friends	Great Britain	The ship was lost at "Princess Harbour", Africa.
Friends	Great Britain	The ship foundered in the White Sea whilst on a voyage from Arkhangelsk, Russia to London with the loss of all but two of her crew.
General Keppel	Great Britain	The ship was lost whilst on a voyage from the United States to the West Indies.
Harmony	Great Britain	The ship foundered whilst on a voyage from Liverpool to Newfoundland.
Herald	Great Britain	The ship foundered in the Atlantic Ocean. Her crew were rescued by Mercury (Great Britain). Herald was on a voyage from Africa to the West Indies.
Inclination	United States	The ship was lost at Hog Island, Virginia. She was on a voyage from Bremen to Baltimore, Maryland.
Industry	Great Britain	The ship was lost at Jérémie. She was on a voyage from Saint-Domingue to London.
Industry	United States	The ship was lost whilst on a voyage from Saint Vincent to Virginia.
Jemmy	United States	The ship was lost near New York. She was on a voyage from New York to Jamaica.
Jenny	United States	The ship was wrecked on the Marinella Keys. She was on a voyage from Havana to Philadelphia, Pennsylvania.
John	(Kingdom of Great Britain) Tobago	The schooner foundered whilst on a voyage from Saint Vincent to London.
Joseph & Francis	Great Britain	War of the Second Coalition: The ship was captured and sunk by the privateer Ferret (France). She was on a voyage from Poole, Dorset, to Newfoundland.
Julius	Hamburg	The ship ran aground on the Goodwin Sands, Kent, Great Britain. She was on a voyage from Hamburg to Tranquebar, India.
Jupiter	Hamburg	The ship was wrecked on the Sugar Key Reefs, off the Bahamas. She was on a voyage from Hamburg to Havana.
Kitty	Great Britain	The ship was lost with the loss of 24 of her crew. She was on a voyage from Liverpool to Africa.
Lady Hammond	Great Britain	The ship foundered whilst on a voyage from the Turks Islands to Virginia.
Liberty	Great Britain	The whaler was lost off the coast of California ca. late 1798.
Lion	Great Britain	The ship was wrecked on the Nantucket Shoals. She was on a voyage from London to St. Ubes, Portugal and Boston, Massachusetts, United States.
Lively	Great Britain	The ship was driven ashore and wrecked at Quebec City. She was on a voyage from London to Quebec City.
Lovely Lass	Great Britain	The ship foundered off Cape Lopez, Africa.
Mable	Great Britain	The ship was wrecked in the Colorados, off the coast of Cuba. Her crew were rescued. She was on a voyage from Jamaica to New York, United States.
Mary	Great Britain	War of the Second Coalition: The ship was captured and sunk. She was on a voyage from Carolina, United States to Antigua.
New Jersey	Great Britain	The ship was driven ashore in the Delaware River. She was on a voyage from Puerto Rico to Philadelphia, Pennsylvania.
Omoa	Great Britain	The ship was wrecked at Bahamas. Her crew were rescued.
Parr	Great Britain	African slave trade: The slave ship was destroyed by an explosion off the coast of Africa. Twenty-nine crew and about 200 slaves were rescued.
Patty	Great Britain	The ship was driven ashore and wrecked on the "Island of Hai". She was on a voyage from Liverpool to Virginia.
Princess Augusta	Great Britain	War of the Second Coalition: The ship was captured and burnt by the privateer frigate Boulonnaise (France). She was on a voyage from Mogadore, Morocco to London.
Príncipe Real	Portugal	The ship was lost in the Bay of Lancois Pequenos, Brazil. She was on a voyage from Lisbon to Pará, Brazil.
Ranger	Great Britain	The ship was lost at Port Antonio, Jamaica. She was on a voyage from Jamaica to Liverpool.
Rodney	Great Britain	The ship foundered. She was on a voyage from Boston to Tobago.
Saint Ann 1797 ship (2)	Great Britain	The ship was lost at sea after 7 July.
Sally	Great Britain	War of the First Coalition: The ship was captured by the French and taken in to Puerto Rico. She was later burnt. Sally was on a voyage from Tortola to Saint-Domingue and Jamaica.
Saucy George	United States	The ship exploded and sank off Fort Jackson with the loss of six of her crew. She was on a voyage from Charleston, South Carolina to Martinique.
Sophia	United States	The ship foundered. She was on a voyage from Barcelona, Spain to New York.
Spooner	(Kingdom of Great Britain) Tobago	The schooner foundered.
Star	Great Britain	The schooner was lost at Barbados on "31 June".
Tarantube	Great Britain	The ship was wrecked west of Martinique.
Trial	Great Britain	The ship foundered in the Atlantic Ocean. She was on a voyage from Saint Thomas, Virgin Islands to Antigua.
Triton	Great Britain	War of the Second Coalition: The ship was captured and burnt by a privateer. She was on a voyage from Lisbon to Newfoundland.
Triton	Great Britain	The ship was abandoned in the Atlantic Ocean. Her crew were rescued. She was on a voyage from Newfoundland to Bristol.
Turner	Great Britain	The ship was lost at Port Antonio. She was on a voyage from Jamaica to London.
Unnamed	Spain	Quasi War:The 12-ton schooner was burned by a mob at Savannah, Georgia sometime before 22 September. She had operated previously as a French privateer.
Vengeur	France	The ship, a prize of Pilgrim (Great Britain), was lost at Goree, Africa.
York	Great Britain	The ship was lost whilst on a voyage from Halifax to Martinique.
