= Charles Dashwood =

Charles Dashwood may refer to:

- Charles Dashwood (judge) (1842–1919), Australian public servant and judge
- Charles Dashwood (Royal Navy officer) (1765–1847), British officer
