= Raymond baronets =

Hereditary title in the Baronetage of Great Britain

Escutcheon of the Burrell baronets of Valentine House

The Raymond Baronetcy of Valentine House, in the County of Essex, was created in the Baronetage of Great Britain on 31 May 1774 for Charles Raymond, of Valentines, Ilford in Essex, who was High Sheriff of Essex from 1771 to 1772. A prominent East India Company Captain, after his retirement from the sea, he was manager of their voyages.

The title was created with special remainder to his son-in-law William Burrell, husband of his daughter Sophia, who succeeded him as 2nd Baronet; he was the nephew of Sir Merrik Burrell, 1st Baronet of the 1766 creation. The 2nd, 3rd, 4th and 5th Baronets were Members of Parliament.

== Raymond, later Burrell baronets, of Valentine House (1774) ==
- Sir Charles Raymond, 1st Baronet (1713–1788)
- Sir William Burrell, 2nd Baronet (1732–1796)
- Sir Charles Merrik Burrell, 3rd Baronet (1774–1862)
- Sir Percy Burrell, 4th Baronet (1812–1876)
- Sir Walter Wyndham Burrell, 5th Baronet (1814–1886)
- Sir Charles Raymond Burrell, 6th Baronet (1848–1899)
- Sir Merrik Raymond Burrell, 7th Baronet (1877–1957)
- Sir Walter Raymond Burrell, 8th Baronet (1903–1985)
- Sir John Raymond Burrell, 9th Baronet (1934–2008)
- Sir Charles Raymond Burrell, 10th Baronet (b. 1962)

The heir apparent is the present holder's only son Edward Lambert Burrell.

== See also ==
- Burrell baronets, of West Grinstead Park (1766)
- Baron Gwydyr

Baronetage of Great Britain
Preceded by Gibbes baronets	Raymond baronets of Valentine House; 31 May 1774	Succeeded by Smith baronets
