= HMS Magic =

Two ships of the Royal Navy have borne the name HMS Magic. A third was planned, but renamed before being launched:

- HMS Magic was to have been a Laforey-class destroyer. She was renamed HMS Lassoo before being launched in 1915.
- HMS Magic (1915) was an Admiralty M-class destroyer, ordered as HMS Marigold, but renamed before being launched in 1915. She was sold in 1921.
- HMS Magic (J400) was a Catherine-class minesweeper launched in 1943 and sunk in 1944.

== See also ==
- HMS Magician
- HMS Magicienne
