= Charles Dashwood (Royal Navy officer) =

Royal Navy officer

Vice-Admiral Sir Charles Dashwood KCB
- Born: 1 September 1765; Somerset, England
- Died: 21 September 1847 (aged 82); London, England
- Military career
- Allegiance: Great Britain; United Kingdom
- Branch: Royal Navy
- Service years: 1779–1847
- Rank: Vice admiral
- Commands: HMS Sylph; HMS Bacchante; HMS Franchise; HMS Belvidera; HMS Pyramus; HMS Cressy; HMS Norge; HMS Windsor Castle; HMS Impregnable
- Conflicts: American War of Independence; Action of 9 August 1780; Battle of the Saintes; French Revolutionary Wars; Glorious First of June; Action of 24 August 1798; Battle of Tory Island; Action of 31 July 1801; Action of 28 September 1801; Napoleonic Wars; Battle of Copenhagen; War of 1812; Battle of New Orleans; Battle of Lake Borgne
- Awards: Knight Commander of the Order of the Bath

Vice-Admiral Sir Charles Dashwood KCB^{[a]} (1 September 1765 – 21 September 1847) was a Royal Navy officer who served in the American War of Independence, French Revolutionary and Napoleonic Wars and War of 1812. He had a long and prestigious naval career, gaining his own command by the last stages of the French Revolutionary Wars. He took part in a number of famous naval battles during his career, such as the Battle of the Saintes, the Glorious First of June and the Battle of Tory Island, where he received the sword of the French commodore, Jean Bompart. His record also includes extensive operations in the West Indies and the Baltic Sea, followed by the expedition to New Orleans in 1815.

== Early life and American War of Independence service ==
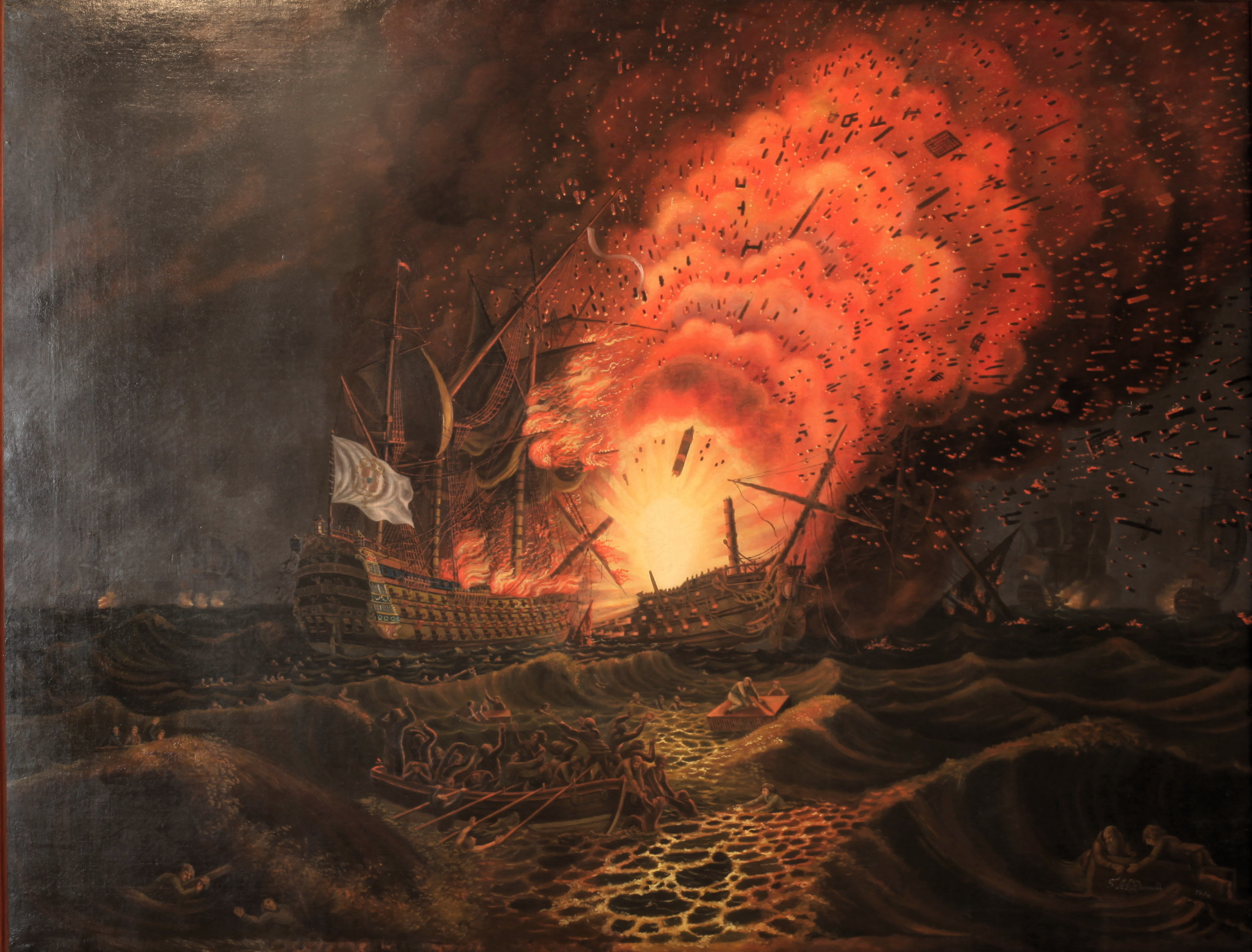
French ship César blows up at the Battle of the Saintes.

Charles Dashwood was born on 1 September 1765 in Vallon Wood, Somerset, England, where his family resided for three hundred years. His father was Mr. Robert Dashwood and his mother was Hon. Mary Sweeting. He was baptized on the day of his birth at Bicknoller.

At the age of thirteen, Dashwood entered the Royal Navy, being appointed as a midshipman on 9 January 1779, and embarking on board the 74-gun ship HMS Courageux, commanded by Captain Lord Mulgrave. After serving some time with the Channel Fleet, from March 1780 to January 1782 he embarked successively on board the frigate HMS Southampton and on HMS Grafton, both under the orders of Captain Garnier, under whom he witnessed the action of 9 August 1780, where the Southampton narrowly escaped to a Franco-Spanish fleet. Returning from Jamaica to England with Garnier in the Grafton, he embarked on board HMS Formidable, flagship of Sir George Rodney, acting as aide-de-camp during the Battle of the Saintes, where the French fleet was beaten thanks to the innovative tactic of "breaking the line", giving Britain a weapon to wield at the Treaty of Versailles, and restoring the status quo that the British had in the West Indies to that of 1776. An eyewitness account of the battle was written by him. During the heat of the battle, Rodney asked Dashwood to make him a glass of lemonade, the ingredients for which were at hand. Not having anything to stir it with but a knife that was already discoloured by the cutting of the lemon, George Rodney said, on Dashwood presenting it to him: "Child, that may do for a midshipman, but not for an admiral. Take it yourself and send my servant to me."

== French Revolutionary Wars ==
After the American War of Independence, Dashwood was employed as master's mate on board the sloop HMS Cygnet until he was sent to the 50-gun fourth-rate HMS Bristol. He served on the latter until she was put out of commission in 1786. After being paid off in 1787, Dashwood joined the packet-service at Falmouth, where he remained for two years. Shortly afterwards he was appointed commander of a merchant vessel, cruising between London and Jamaica until the renewal of hostilities against the French Republic in 1793.

HMS Brunswick fighting Achille and Vengeur du Peuple simultaneously at the Battle of the Glorious 1 June 1794, by Nicholas Pocock.

In early March 1794, he was appointed as a junior lieutenant aboard HMS Impregnable, flagship of Rear-Admirals Benjamin Caldwell and Andrew Mitchell. He distinguished himself in the Glorious First of June, at which British Admiral Richard Howe attempted to destroy a large French fleet protecting a convoy. The convoy escaped the British, but seven French ships were taken and the rest driven back to France. Impregnable was heavily engaged in the action and suffered severe damage. During the course of the engagement, Dashwood had to lash the fore top-sail yard which had been shot in the slings, to the cap, whereby the ship was enabled to wear in pursuit of the enemy. For this action he was promoted, on 20 June 1794, to the rank of full lieutenant. Dashwood's next appointments were from 13 August 1796 to late 1798; first on board HMS Defiance and then on board HMS Magnanime frigate of 48 guns. On the former he resisted a mutiny, while on the latter he assisted in the capture of the 36-gun French frigate Décade, on 24 August 1798, off Cape Finisterre.

He was also present at the Battle of Tory Island, where the French squadron under Jean Bompart was defeated off the coast of Ireland. During the course of the engagement, Charles Dashwood captured the 74-gun Hoche, and later received the sword of the French commodore. He was superseded by an officer of HMS Canada, bearing Sir John B. Warren's broad pendant, and was appointed in command of Coquille, one of the frigates captured that day, which he sailed into Belfast and then to Plymouth. She was accidentally burnt on 14 December, and several of her crew, along with three women, perished. He continued serving on board Magnagnime and after contributing to the capture of some privateers, on 2 August 1799 he was promoted to the rank of commander, and appointed captain of the 18-gun ship HMS Sylph.

The following year, Dashwood's command was employed on operations within gunshot distance of the French batteries in Brest harbour, and on one occasion, during a foggy night, he rescued the British frigate HMS Alcmene, after she had become grounded and began drifting among the rocks. On 31 July, while stationed off the north-coast of Spain, Dashwood beat off the 44-gun French frigate Artémise;^{[b]} after a vigorous action of an hour and 29 minutes. On 28 September, about 40 leagues to the north of Cape Pinas, he discovered a large ship, apparently of similar force to her former opponent. After exchanging broadsides and conducting several tacks, at 7:30 pm the Sylph succeeded in placing herself on the weather bow of the frigate, and the engagement commenced, which continued for two hours until the enemy escaped, having inflicted heavy damage on Sylph's sails and rigging.

After beating the enemy twice, Dashwood, on rejoining the fleet off Brest, was congratulated by Admiral William Cornwallis who recommended to the Board of Admiralty that he be promoted, albeit with no effect.^{[c]} Dashwood had repeatedly hailed the enemy to ascertain her name and nation, but received no answer. In consequence of not being able to tell the name of the enemy ship, his promotion was delayed, as it evidenced in the following letter from the Earl of St. Vincent, replying to Cornwallis' recommendation of Dashwood's application for a post commission:

I have read your official letter with all the attention such a recital merits; but until the Board receive official information of the force, and the nation to which the vessel belongs, which the Sylph was engaged with, and adequate judgement cannot be formed of the merits of the action.

Dashwood was finally promoted to Post-captain on 2 November 1801, and was given command of the 20-gun sloop HMS Bacchante on 28 November 1803. Aboard that ship he convoyed a fleet from Porto and then proceeded to the West Indies, where he captured, on 3 April 1803, the Spanish schooner La Elizabeth, of 10 guns and 47 men. On 14 May 1805 he also took El Felix, a Spanish letter-of-marque of six guns and 42 men. He later wrote an account of the capture to Rear-Admiral James Dacres:

Bacchante, off the Havana, May 14, 1805.
Sir, I beg to acquaint you, that the Spanish schooner le Felix, a Letter of Marque, pierced for ten guns, but only six mounted, with a complement of forty-two men, commanded by Francisco Lopes, laden with coffee and bees wax, from the Havana to Vera Cruz, was this day captured by His Majesty's Ship under my Command, after a Chase of four hours. She sailed the preceding evening, and was permitted to do so from her very great superiority of sailing, and is the first Vessel that has quitted that anchorage since the Embargo was laid on.

I have the honour to be, &c. C. DASHWOOD, Captain.

== Napoleonic Wars ==
On 5 April 1805, as Bacchante was cruising off Havana, Dashwood received information that there were three French privateers lying in the harbour of Mariel, located to the westward and defended by a tower nearly 40 feet high, on the top of which were placed three long 24-pounders, and round its oval numerous loop-holes for musketry. Dashwood endeavoured to cut them out. Accordingly, in the evening, he dispatched on that service two boats, containing about 35 seamen and marines, under the command of Lieutenant Thomas Oliver, with directions to attack and carry the fort prior to entering the harbour. When the boats pushed off, the tower fired at them. Seeing that no time was to be lost, the British marines rushed to the foot of the tower and scaled it. It was defended by a Spanish captain and 30 soldiers, who were quickly over powered after suffering casualties of two killed and three wounded. The privateers had already left the harbour, but Oliver, determined not to quit the harbour empty-handed, captured two schooners laden with sugar, which were brought away.

While commanding HMS Franchise, a frigate of 36 guns,^{[d]} Dashwood saw action in the West Indies, where he captured the Spanish schooner El Carmen and the Dutch armed vessel Brutus. In January 1806 Dashwood received information that several Spanish vessels had anchored in the Bay of Campeche and he determined to try to capture them. On the night of 6 January, having anchored about 5 miles (8.0 km) from the town of Campeche, Dashwood dispatched three of Franchise's boats, under the command of three lieutenants. Because of the distance they had to row, the British did not reach the Spanish vessels until 4:00 am on the 7th, by which time the moon had risen, their approach had been observed and the Spaniards alerted. As the boats pulled in, the British parties became exposed to the fire of two Spanish brigs of war, a schooner and seven gun-boats. After about 10 minutes of hand-to-hand fighting, Dashwood's boarding parties had captured the Spanish national brig Raposa, which mounted 12 guns. The prize was pursued by the other Spanish vessels, which continued to fire on them until they withdrew.

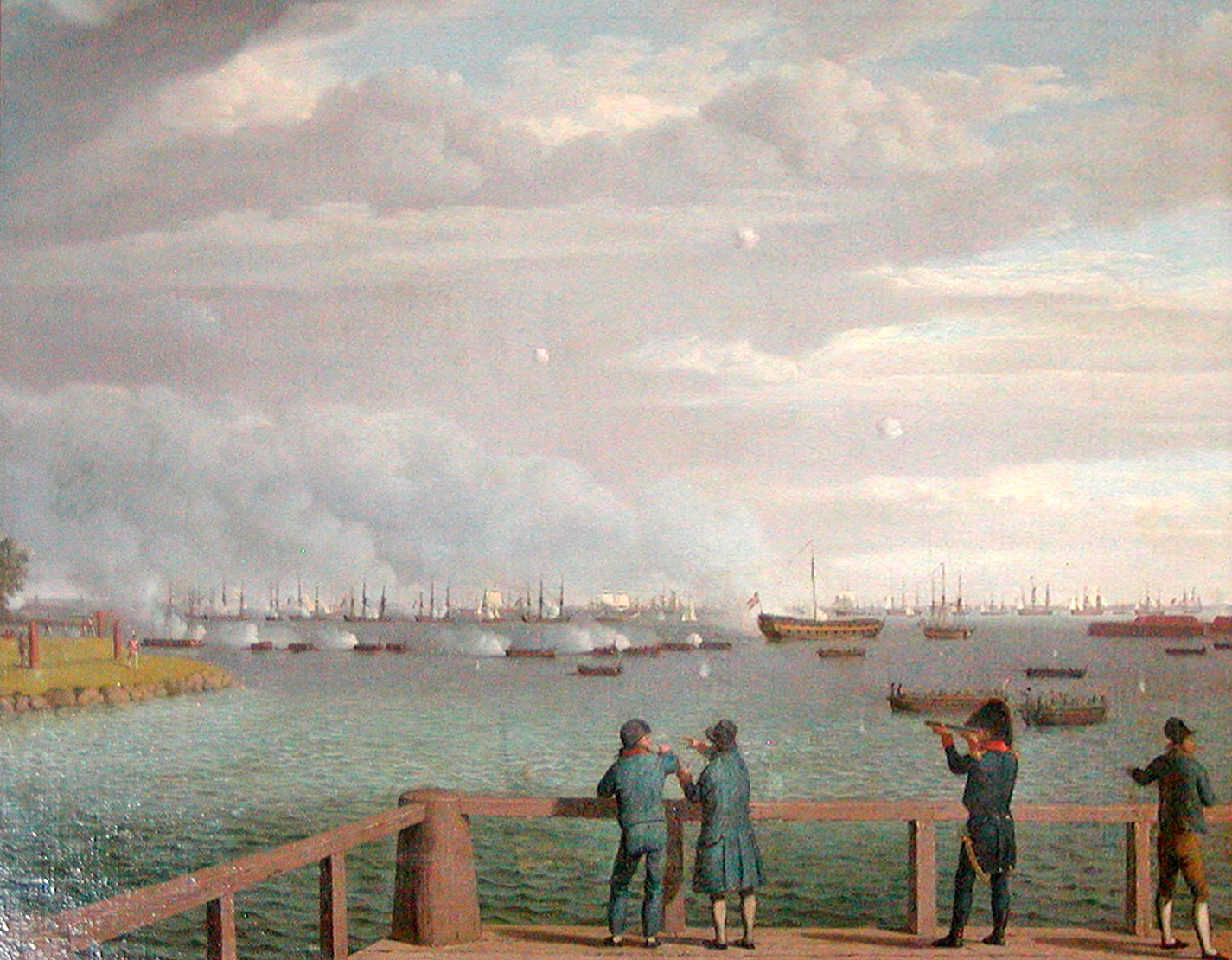
British warships fire upon Copenhagen.

On 1 August 1807, he parted in company with Commodore Richard Keats' squadron and sailed to the passage of the Great Belt, in order to intercept any ships carrying Danish troops crossing from Holstein to Zealand. Accompanied by HMS Magicienne, Dashwood also escorted a convoy of 109 ships from Jamaica, and accompanied James Gambier on his expedition against Copenhagen in August and September 1807. After this expedition, in 1808 he returned to the West Indies with a convoy, and served successively under the orders of John Duckworth and Vice-Admiral James Dacres.

On 17 November 1808 Dashwood rendered an essential service to the Spanish patriots. A squadron under his orders, consisting of the former HM Ships Franchise, Daedalus, Aurora, Reindeer and Pert, blockaded the city of Santo Domingo by taking possession of the town of Samaná, where the French were erecting batteries for their permanent establishment. In the harbour he found two French schooner privateers, Échange and Guerrier, each of five guns and upwards of 100 men, and three trading vessels, all of which were taken. An English ship and a Spanish one were also recaptured while in the act of entering the port. After this brief action, he handed the port over a Spanish force under Don Diego de Lira, and a couple of weeks later he sailed to Port Royal, in Jamaica, with his captures. Dashwood also captured Le Hazard, a French privateer of four guns and 40 men off Scilly. In January 1809, he captured L'Iphigénie, a French letter-of-marque pierced for 18 guns. On 22 September 1809 Captain Dashwood presided a court martial to try Joseph Fountain, Master of HMS Polyphemus. Dashwood's next command was the 36-gun frigate HMS Belvidera, which he obtained in January 1810, and held that command until March. He was then appointed to HMS Pyramus, a 36-gun frigate fitting for the Baltic station. Cruising on those latitudes, Dashwood captured a Danish privateer, giving notice of his feat:

Sir, I beg to acquaint you, that the Danish three-masted schooner privateer Norsk Mod, of six guns, four swivels, 28 men, and of 100 tons burthen, commanded by Mathias Bergt, was captured at two o'clock this morning by the Pyramus. – This privateer had left Arundel only six hours, and sailed for the express purpose of annoying the very large convoy that sailed yesterday from Gottenburgh for England.

I have the honour to be, &c. C. DASHWOOD, Captain.

== Later service ==
During the winter of 1811, Dashwood commanded a squadron of 10 sloops and smaller vessels, in order to collect and bring home the remnant of Rear-Admiral Robert Reynold's convoy that had been prevented from passing through the Skagerrak by bad weather. On this occasion, he availed himself of a strong S.S.W. wind, and boldly pushed through the Malmö Channel, instead of the Great Belt as ordered, saving the remaining of ships from destruction.

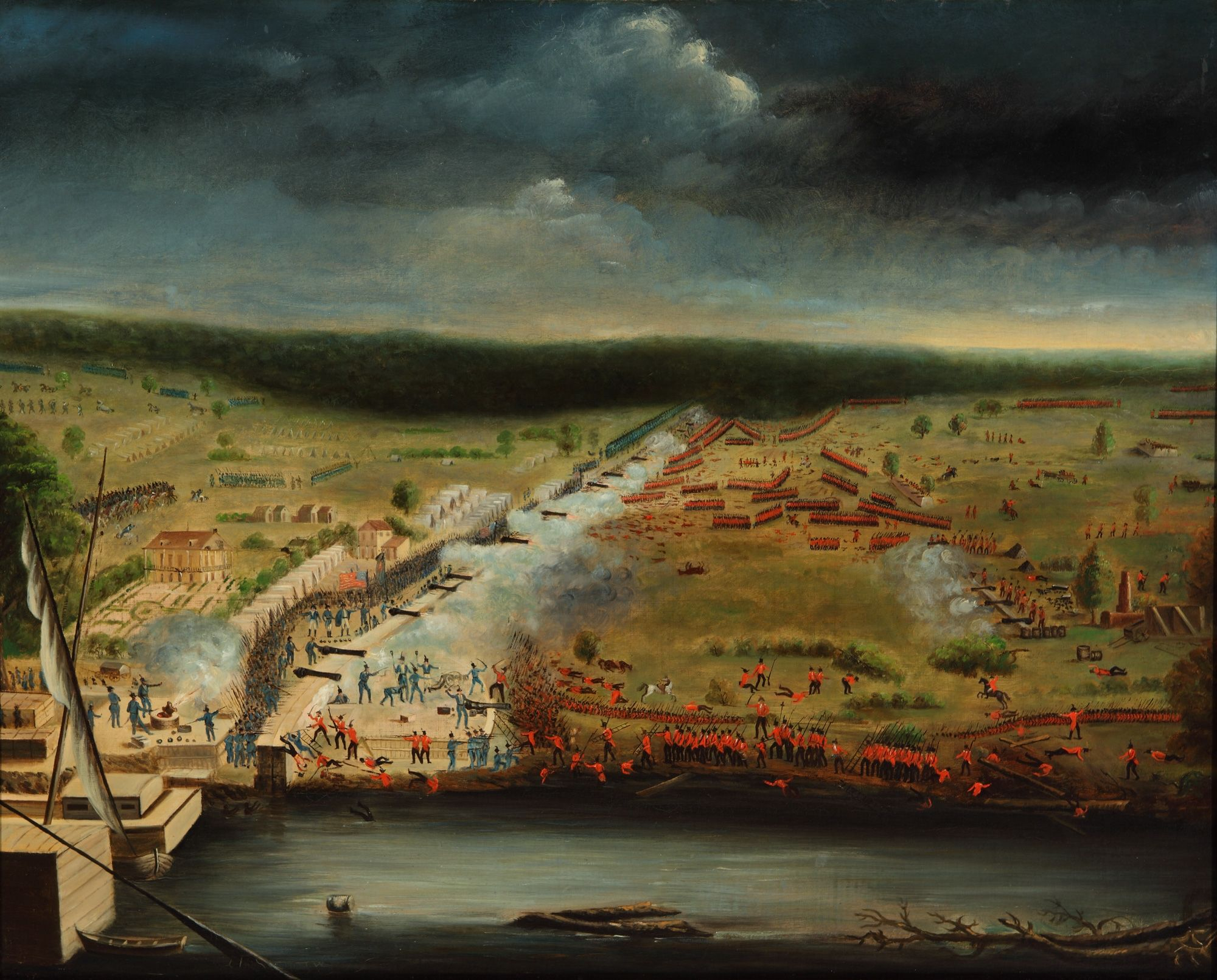
The Battle of New Orleans.

In the Baltic, amidst the context of the Anglo-Swedish War, Dashwood received notice that the Swedes were fitting out eight sail of the line and five frigates at Karlskrona. The British consul in Sweden, a man named Smith, passed on to Dashwood a request from the Swedish government that those ships not be molested. Dashwood gave orders to his crew to respect the Swedish flag, and also informed Swedish Admiral Puke that there should not be misunderstanding between the two nations, as war between the United Kingdom and Sweden existed only on paper. Early in the spring, he was sent with his squadron to provide protection to the island of Anholt, which was threatened by the Danes. No action followed, though, as the Danish attempt to occupy the island was abandoned on the appearance of Dashwood's fleet.

Afterwards Dashwood took eight American merchantmen, and on 15 June 1812, he captured the Hope,^{[e]} a merchant ship off the north of Gotland. On 14 August 1812 he was appointed captain of HMS Cressy of 74 guns, and given a piece of plate by the officers of HMS Pyramus. After serving in the North Sea under Admiral Sir William Young, Dashwood escorted a convoy to the West Indies, whence he returned with another of equal importance. At the review of the fleet at Spithead, in the summer of 1814, he steered the Royal barge. Afterwards he took part, commanding HMS Norge of 74 guns, in the Battle of New Orleans, where he assisted Admiral Pulteney Malcolm in the debarkation of the army, being reported by Sir Alexander Cochrane. He was also present at the Battle of Lake Borgne, where a few gunboats of the Norge, in company with other small vessels, captured five American gunboats. In 1815, when at anchor in Port Royal, his ship was struck by lightning, which broke the main-topgallant-mast in three pieces, shivered the maintop-mast and brought the mizentop-mast and topgallant-mast down on to deck. In 1821 he was given command of HMS Windsor Castle of 74 guns, and HMS Impregnable, of 104 guns, as Cochrane's flag-captain. He recommissioned Windsor Castle on 4 January 1822, as part of the guard-ships in Hamoaze. In 1825 he was put onto half-pay, and was made a rear-admiral on 22 July 1830. He assumed the rank of vice-admiral on 23 November 1841. Charles died while at service, on 21 September 1847. Consequently, on 22 September 1847, the Admiralty promoted him posthumously to the rank of admiral.

== Family ==
In 1799, Dashwood married Elizabeth de Courcy, the daughter of Lord Kingsale, John de Courcy. They had three children. His two eldest sons, Charles Robert and John De Courcy, were commissioned into the Royal Navy. His youngest son, Francis, became a captain in the Bengal Horse Artillery.

== Footnotes ==
- a. He was knighted on 20 April 1825, and made a Grand Cross Tower and Sword on 30 March 1825, conferred to him when the King of Portugal went on board HMS Windsor Castle, while at anchor on the Tagus, in May 1824. Dashwood was appointed Knight Commander of the Order of the Bath of Maxwelton on 4 July 1840.
- b. The real name and force of this ship, still remains unclear.
- c. This was because both actions were fought at night.
- d. Captain Dashwood held the command of HMS Franchise from 21 October 1805 until January 1810.
- e. Boarded by HMS Pyramus, off the north end of Gotland, it appeared to be a neutral property, but Dashwood ordered the ship to join a British convoy, in order to prevent her from going to an enemy's port with naval stores.
