= Princess Amelia (1786 EIC ship) =

History

Great Britain
- Name: Princess Amelia
- Namesake: Princess Amelia of Great Britain
- Owner: Robert Williams
- Operator: British East India Company
- Builder: Barnard & Dudman, Deptford, or Randall
- Launched: 8 November 1786
- Fate: Burned 5 April 1798

General characteristics
- Tons burthen: 799, or 808, or 80849/94
- Length: Overall:143 ft 8 1/2 in (43.8 m); Keel:116 ft 2 1/2 in (35.4 m) (keel)
- Beam: 36 ft 3 in (11.0 m)
- Depth of hold: 14 ft 11 in (4.5 m)
- Propulsion: Sails
- Sail plan: Full-rigged ship
- Complement: 1795:100; 1797:100
- Armament: 1795:26 × 9&6-pounder guns; 1797:26 × 12&6-pounder guns
- Notes: Three decks

Princess Amelia was launched in 1786 as an East Indiaman for the British East India Company (EIC). She made four voyages to India for the EIC and was lost in April 1798 to a fire off the Malabar Coast.

== Career ==
EIC voyage #1 (1787–1788): Captain Stephen Williams sailed from The Downs on 19 February 1787, bound for Madras and Bengal. Princess Amelia was at Madeira on 13 March, reached Madras on 8 July, and arrived at Diamond Harbour on 21 July. Homeward bound, she was at Saugor on 7 March 1788. She returned to Madras on 26 March, reached St Helena on 1 July, and arrived at The Downs on 31 August.

EIC voyage #2 (1790–1791): Captain George Millett sailed from The Downs on 25 March 1790, bound for Bengal. Princess Amelia arrived at Diamond Harbour on 2 August. Homeward bound, she was at Saugor on 3 December, reached the Cape of Good Hope on 26 January 1791 and St Helena on 14 February, and arrived at The Downs on 20 April.

EIC voyage #3 (1793–1794): Captain Millett sailed from Portsmouth on 5 Apr 1793, bound for Madras and Bengal. Princess Amelia reached Madras on 14 August and arrived at Diamond Harbour on 7 September. Homeward bound, she was at Saugor on 9 November, reached St Helena on 11 February 1794, and arrived at The Downs on 30 April.

EIC voyage #4 (1795–1796): War with France had broken out during Princess Amelia's last voyage. Captain Millett acquired a letter of marque on 3 April 1795. He sailed from Portsmouth on 24 May, bound for Bombay. Princess Amelia arrived at Bombay on 3 September. Homeward bound, she reached St Helena on 22 March 1796 and arrived at The Downs on 3 August.

== Loss ==
Captain John Ramsden took over command of Princess Amelia for her next voyage. He had just lost Middlesex, another ship owned by Robert Williams. He acquired a letter of marque on 10 March 1797.

Captain Ramsden sailed from Portsmouth on 6 April 1797, bound for Bombay, on what was Princess Amelia's fifth voyage for the EIC.

Princess Amelia was homeward bound when on 5 April 1798 a fire destroyed her at 14°01′N 74°19′E off Pidgeon's Island on the Malabar Coast. The fire, of unknown origin, began in the aft hold around 1a.m., and developed so quickly nothing could be saved. Sixteen crew and 24 passengers died; 80 crew and 59 passengers survived. It appears that Woodcot, which was on her way to Tellichery, picked up the survivors. (Woodcot arrived at Tellichery on 16 April; the French capture her there, together with Raymond, on 20 April. The French put ashore the captains, crews, and passengers, together with their baggage, they had captured.)

The EIC put the value of the cargo it lost when Princess Amelia burned at £22,061.

== Post script ==
Captain Ramsden was among the sea captains who provided testimonials in support of Thomas Earnshaw's chronometer. Ramsden had gotten his Earnshaw chronometer from Captain Millet and used it on his ill-fated voyage to Bombay.
