= Sir William Burrell, 2nd Baronet =

English antiquarian

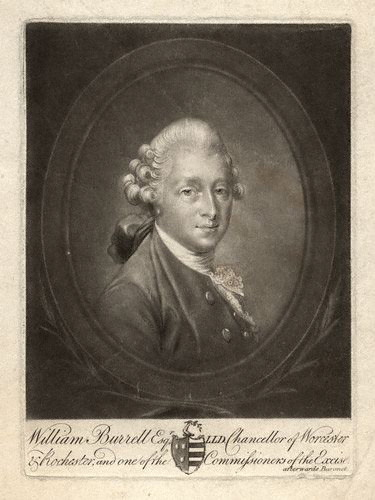
Sir William Burrell, engraving by Robert Laurie

Sir William Burrell FRS FSA (10 October 1732 – 20 January 1796) was an English antiquarian.

== Biography ==
He was the third son of Peter Burrell of Beckenham, Kent, and was born in Leadenhall Street on 10 October 1732. He was educated at St. John's College, Cambridge, whence he graduated as LL.B in 1755, and LL.D in 1760, and in the latter year (3 November) was admitted as an advocate at Doctors' Commons. He practised chiefly in the admiralty court, and there were in the possession of his grandson, Sir Walter Burrell, two volumes of his own manuscript reports of cases decided in that court between the years 1766 and 1774. They were edited by Mr. R. G. Marsden in 1885.

Burrell was made chancellor of the Diocese of Worcester in 1764, and held the same office in the Diocese of Rochester, continuing in both posts till his death. He was elected M.P. for Haslemere in 1768, and became a commissioner of excise in 1774, being re-elected for Haslemere in that year. He was also FRS and FSA, and a director of the South Sea Company. By his marriage in 1773 with his cousin Sophia Raymond, a noted poet and dramatist and daughter of Sir Charles Raymond, he acquired considerable wealth. His father-in-law was created a baronet in 1773 with reversion of the title to Burrell and his heirs, which allowed him to succeed Raymond as 2nd baronet in 1789.

From an early period in life he was interested in antiquarian pursuits and ultimately concentrated his attention upon the history of the county of Sussex. Nearly every parish of Sussex was personally visited by him and its records inspected and partly copied. Drawings were made for him of churches, houses and sepulchral monuments, and he spared no labour in tracing the descent of the county families. He did not print any portion of his work, but bequeathed the entire collection to the British Museum, where it is now deposited among the Add. MSS. His interest in local history was not confined to England however, as he traveled Scotland extensively in 1758. Tourism had scarcely touched Scotland before the middle of the 18th century, making Burrell's travel journals an important early source of local history and Scotland's social and economic conditions.

Burrell was seized with paralysis in August 1787, and, though he partially recovered, found it necessary to resign his public appointments. He retired to Deepdene in Surrey with his wife Sophia, and there died on 20 January 1796. He was buried at St George's Church, West Grinstead, Sussex, where a simple monument to his memory by Flaxman has been placed in the church. A secondary monument (also by Flaxman) was erected at West Grinstead.

Lady Burrell married secondly the clergyman William Clay. She died on the Isle of Wight 20 June 1802.

Baronetage of Great Britain
| Preceded by Charles Raymond | Baronet (of Valentine House); 1788–1796 | Succeeded by Charles Burrell |
