= Charles Raymond, 1st Baronet =

British merchant and aristocrat (1713–1788)

Sir Charles Raymond
- Born: Devon
- Baptised: 23 April 1713
- Died: 24 August 1788; London
- Resting place: St Margaret's Church, Barking
- Years active: 1729 – 1788
- Employer: East India Company
- Spouse: Sarah Webster (m. 1743)
- Children: 3

Sir Charles Raymond, 1st Baronet (1713 – 24 August 1788) was a British merchant and aristocrat. Born to a minor gentry family in Devon, Raymond entered the East India Company in c. 1729, and eventually rose to become one of the company's leading figures.

== Early life ==
Charles Raymond was born in Devon in 1713, the son of John Raymond of Marple and his wife Anna Maria Tanner. He was the couple's fifth child: he had an elder sister, Anna Maria, and three elder brothers who had died young prior to Charles' birth. He was baptised at Withycombe Raleigh on 23 April 1713.

Charles' father died in c. 1725, leaving Charles himself set to inherit a considerable property upon his coming of age; his father had been a wealthy gentleman with connections to the East India Company.

== Career ==
=== East India Company ===
Charles Raymond undertook his first voyage at sea in c. 1729 at the age of sixteen; he was the purser on Dawsonne, an East Indiaman managed by his uncle, Hugh Raymond. Aboard the Dawsonne, Charles travelled to Madras and Bengal in India. Following this first voyage, Charles took to sea again as fourth mate on the Princess of Wales.

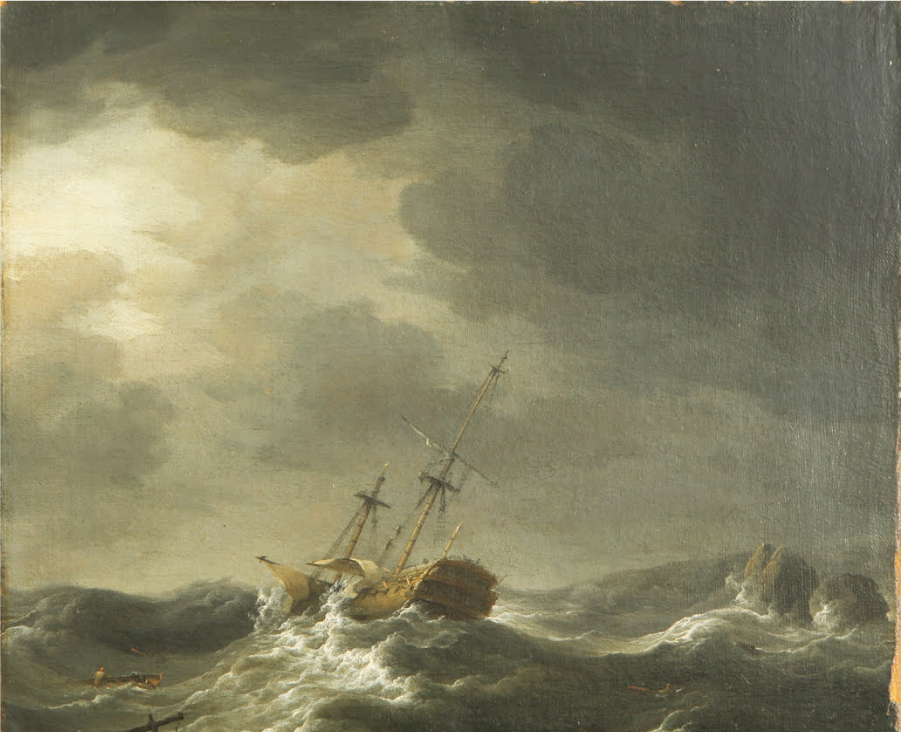
A 1744 painting of Raymond's Wager; by that point, the ship had been sold to the Royal Navy as HMS Wager

Meanwhile, Hugh had had a ship – the Wager – constructed, with his nephew in mind as captain. In 1734, Charles became a captain in the East India Company at the age of just 21; the company would later restrict captaincy to men of 25 years old and above. Charles undertook two journeys on Wager for the East India Company between 1734 and 1746. On these voyages he exploited the opportunity for private trading, building a small fortune for himself.

Charles made two further voyages on other ships. His final voyage began in May 1744. Initially bound for Coromandel in India, the ship was swept off-course by the wind and current, and instead put in at Batavia, Jakarta for repairs and provisioning. They then proceeded to Calcutta, arriving almost a year after leaving England. The crew spent 36 weeks in Calcutta before they were able to set sail for England again, arriving home in August 1746. In all, the crew had spent 117 weeks away from home, and suffered eight losses to a malignant fever – possibly scurvy.

Charles had been due to undertake a fifth voyage in 1747, but recused himself by claiming illness. Instead, he transitioned into a career as a charter-party director, entering contracts with captains to sail aboard his ships. In this, Charles was successful: over the course of 40 years, he served as Principal Managing Owner for more than 100 voyages. This represented roughly a fifth to a quarter of all East India Company voyages in that time period.

=== Valentine House ===
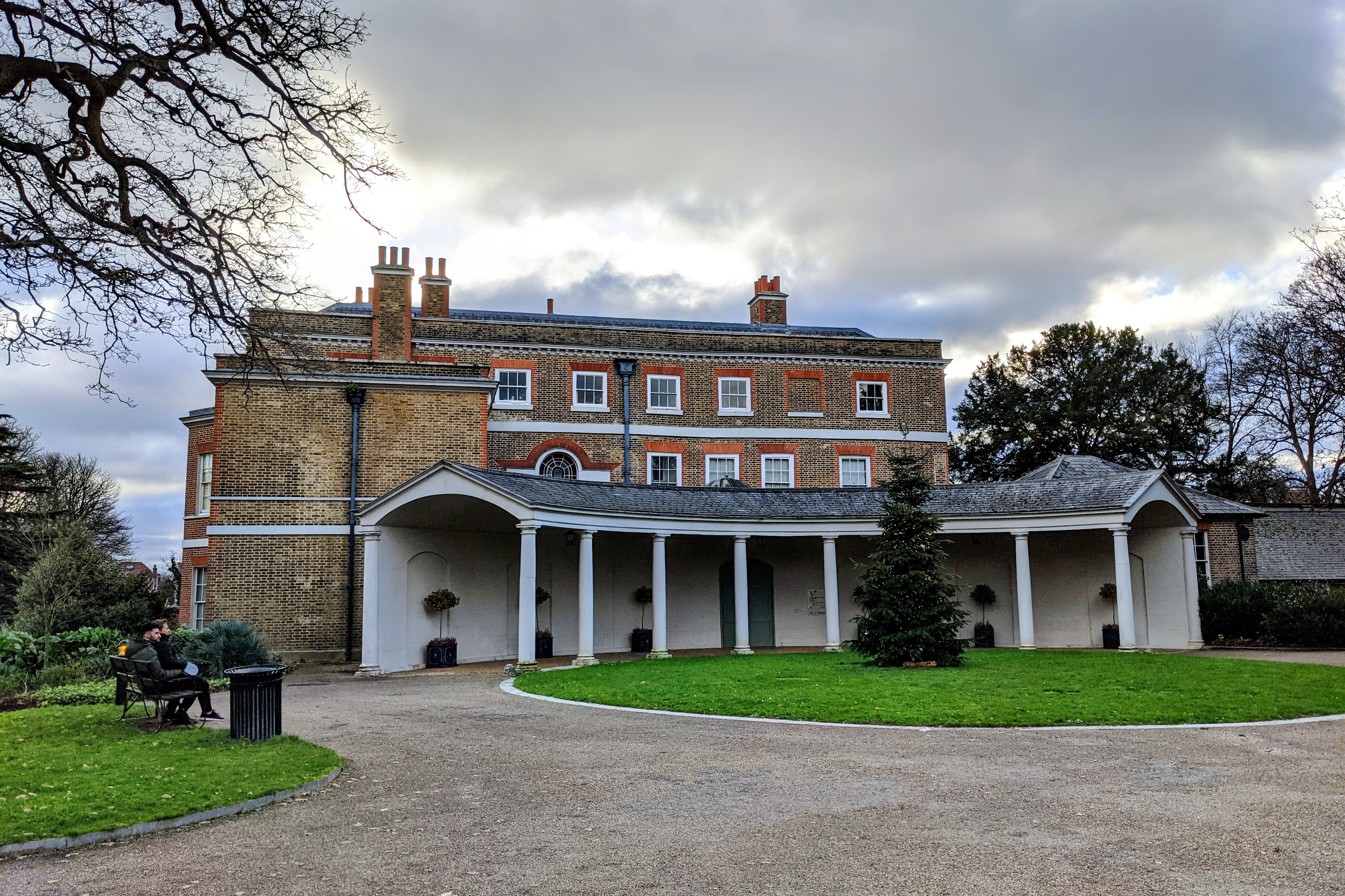
Valentine House (also known as Valentines Mansion), where Raymond lived for many years

Charles Raymond acquired Valentine House, Ilford on 10 October 1754; it had previously belonged to Robert Surman, a business associated of Raymond's. Under his ownership, the main entrance was rebuilt in 1769, including the addition of the Raymond family crest. He also had the surrounding park and gardens greatly expanded, including the introduction of exotic plants such as Camellia japonica and a Black Hamburg Vine.

=== Banking career ===
Charles Raymond's first foray into banking and insurance came with his appointment as Manager of the Sun Fire Office on 8 April 1756. He held the position until 1773, when he disqualified himself to allow his son-in-law, William Burrell, to take the office.

In 1771, Raymond was one of the founding partners of Raymond, Williams, Vere, Lowe & Fletcher, a bank that would eventually be acquired by the Royal Bank of Scotland. Raymond retired from this partnership in 1778, and established a new bank, Raymond, Harley, Webber & Co, win which he remained a partner until his death.

=== Political career ===
In 1771–2, Charles Raymond was Sheriff for the County of Essex. On 31 May 1774 he was created a Baronet.

Raymond twice considered running for Parliament, in Middlesex and in Exeter, but on both occasions withdrew himself from contention prior to the election.

== Family ==
Charles Raymond married Sarah Webster as St Stephen Walbrook, London on 22 January 1743. The couple had a number of children together, though most died in childhood. Three daughters, Sophia, Juliana, and Anna Maria, survived into adulthood. Sarah died in 1778.

== Death and legacy ==
Cranbrook Castle in a postcard sent in 1918

Charles Raymond died on 24 August 1788. A family mausoleum which became known as Cranbrook Castle, Ilford Castle, or Raymond's Folly had been built for him in Ilford in 1765. However it had never been consecrated, and so he was instead buried at St Margaret's Church, Barking. Charles was succeeded as baronet by his eldest daughter Sophia's husband, William Burrell. Cranbrook Castle was demolished in 1923.

== See also ==
- HMS Wager (1739) – Raymond's own ship, later acquired by the Royal Navy, where it became famous for the Wager Mutiny
- Raymond (1782 EIC ship) – An East Indiaman of the East India Company, named after Raymond

Baronetage of Great Britain
Preceded by New creation	Baronet (of Valentine House); 1774–1788	Succeeded by William Burrell
