= Raymond (1782 EIC ship) =

History

Great Britain
- Name: Raymond
- Owner: Henry Boulton
- Builder: Perry, Blackwall
- Launched: December 1782
- Captured: 20 April 1798

United States
- Name: Orion
- Acquired: c.1799 by purchase of a prize
- Fate: Currently unknown

General characteristics
- Tons burthen: 793, or 79378/94 (bm)
- Length: Overall:143 ft 10 in (43.8 m); Keel:116 ft 6 in (35.5 m)
- Beam: 35 ft 9 1/2 in (10.9 m)
- Depth of hold: 14 ft 9 in (4.5 m)
- Propulsion: Sail
- Complement: 100
- Armament: 26 × 9&4-pounder guns
- Notes: Three decks

Raymond was launched in 1782 as an East Indiaman for the British East India Company (EIC). She made six voyages for the EIC and participated as a transport in Admiral Hugh Cloberry Christian's expedition in 1795–96 to the West Indies. The French captured her in 1798. American owners purchased her, renamed her Orion, and sailed her from Mauritius to Boston in 1799.

She was named after Charles Raymond, 1st Baronet, a prominent EIC Captain, and after his retirement from the sea, manager of their voyages.

== Career ==
=== EIC voyage #1 (1783–1784) ===
Captain Joseph Hall sailed from Portsmouth on 16 March 1783, bound for St Helena and Bombay. Raymond reached St Helena on 31 May and arrived at Bombay on 24 September. Homeward bound, she was at the Cape of Good Hope on 7 March 1784, and reached St Helena on 2 April. She visited Ascension Island on 30 April, and arrived at The Downs on 14 June.

=== EIC voyage #2 (1784–1786) ===
Captain Henry Smedley sailed from the Downs on 17 December 1784, bound for St Helena and Bengkulu. Raymond reached St Helena on 12 March 1785, Batavia on 20 July, Benkulen on 14 September, and Manna (southeast of Bencoolen), on 15 January 1786. Homeward bound, she reached St Helena on 16 June and arrived at The Downs on 2 September.

=== EIC voyage #3 (1788–1789) ===
Captain Smedley sailed from Portsmouth on 5 April 1788, bound for Bombay and China. Raymond reached Madagascar on 6 July and arrived at Bombay on 4 August. She was at Batvia on 25 November, and arrived at Whampoa Anchorage on 8 February 1789. Homeward bound, she crossed the Second Bar on 13 March, reached St Helena on 25 June, and arrived at The Downs on 25 August.

=== EIC voyage #4 (1791–1792) ===
Captain Smedley sailed from The Downs on 7 March 1791, bound for Bombay. She reached São Tiago on 8 April, and was at Madagascar on 10 June; she arrived at Bombay on 15 July. On 2 November she was at Cannanore, on 14 November Tellicherry, and 14 December Onore. On 30 December she returned to Bombay. Homeward bound, she was at Tellicherry on 30 January 1792, Anjengo on 8 February and the Cape on 3 May. She reached St Helena on 8 June, and arrived at The Downs on 16 August.

=== EIC voyage #5 (1794–1795) ===
War with France had broken out in 1793 so Captain Smedley acquired a letter of marque on 15 March 1794.

The British government held Raymond at Portsmouth, together with a number of other Indiamen in anticipation of using them as transports for an attack on Île de France (Mauritius). It gave up the plan and released the vessels in May 1794. It paid £458 6s 8d for having delayed her departure by 22 days.

Captain Smedley then sailed from Portsmouth on 2 May, bound for Bombay. Raymond arrived at Bombay on 4 September. She then visited Cannonore (27 October), Calicut (2 November), Anjengo (12 November), Cochin (24 November), and Mahé (9 December), before returning to Bombay on 25 December. Homeward bound she was at Tellicherry on 21 January 1795, reached St Helena on 18 March, and arrived at The Downs on 23 July.

=== 1795-96: West Indies expedition ===
The British Government took up a number of East Indiamen, Raymond among them, and other transports to carry troops on Admiral Christian's expedition to the West Indies. the Fleet did not leave Spithead until 16 November. Bad weather forced the Fleet to return to port after having sustained heavy losses. The Fleet attempted to sail again on 9 December, but bad weather forced most of the warships to return to port on 26 January 1796. The Fleet finally succeeded in leaving on 20 March. Raymond carried hospital tents, bedding, and stores.

The fleet arrived at Barbados around 26 April. It then sailed to invade St Lucia, with troops under Lieutenant-General Sir Ralph Abercromby. St Lucia surrendered to the British on 25 May. The British went on to capture Saint Vincent and Grenada. Raymond arrived at Deal on 7 August.

=== EIC voyage #6 (1797–Loss) ===
Captain Smedley sailed from Portsmouth on 5 June 1797, bound for Bombay.

On 20 April 1798 the French frigate Preneuse captured Raymond just after Raymond came to anchor in Tellicherry Roads. Raymond was homeward bound from Bombay. When she arrived at Tellicherry Woodcot was already there, having loaded a cargo of pepper. Raymond resisted for an hour, and Woodcot for some 20 minutes, before they both struck. The French had fired primarily at the Indiamen's masts and riggings; even so, Raymond had three killed and four or five wounded, among them a woman passenger grazed by a splinter. Casualties on Préneuse were of the same order.

The next day the French, under a flag of truce, sent the captains, crews, and passengers of both ships ashore at Tellicherry with their baggage. Both Raymond and Woodcot then sailed westward under prize crews.

The EIC put a value of £8,963 on the cargo that it had lost on Raymond.

== Postscript ==
Woodcot and Raymond were reported to have been at Île de France in September. The French apparently sold Raymond to American owners who named her Orion. She sailed from Île de France on 25 February 1799, bound for Boston, carrying the French Intendant General and his family, and a number of settlers, all concerned about the unsettled state of the colony.
