= Valentines Park =

Park in Redbridge, London

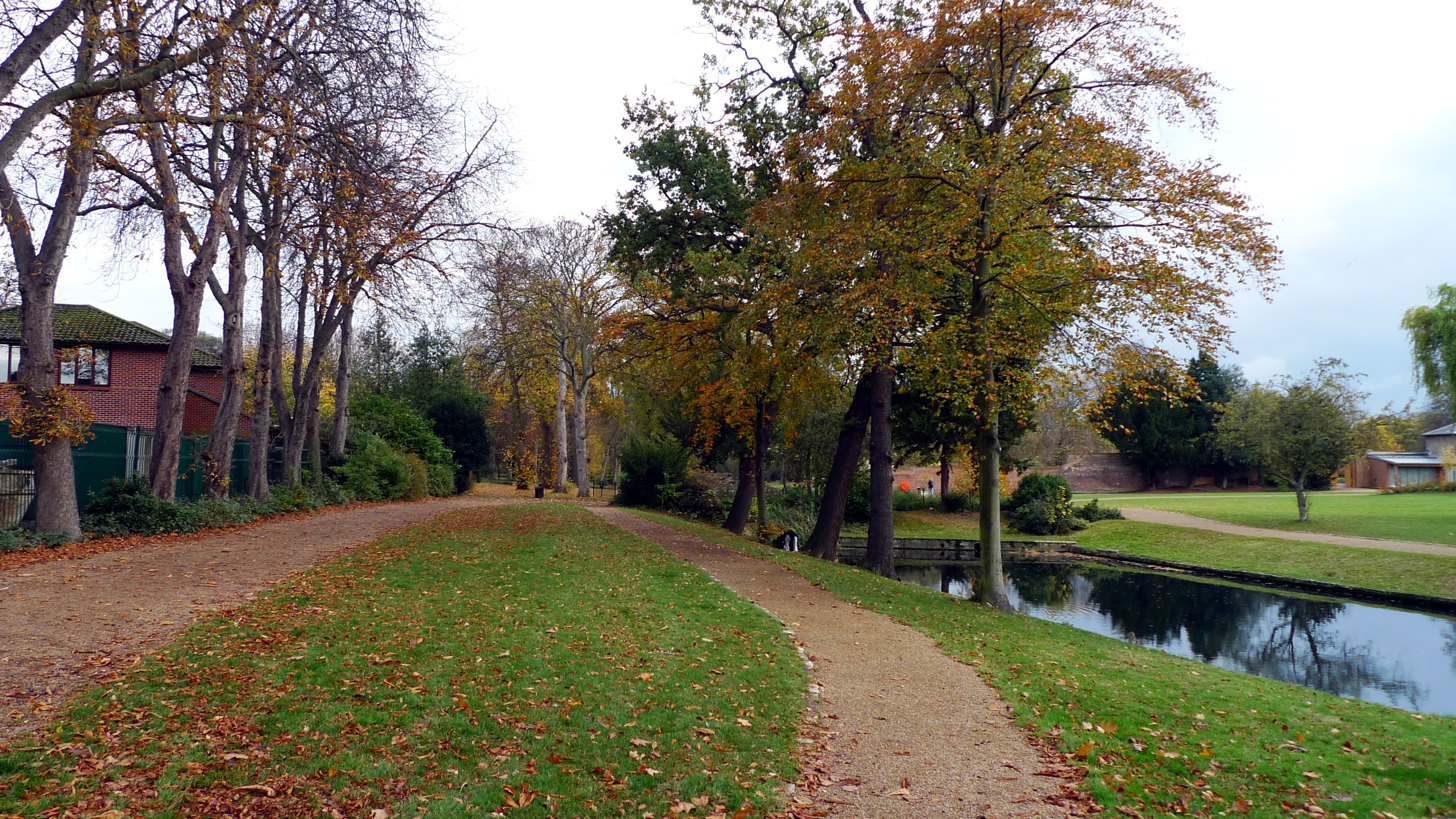
- Entering the park from Cranbrook Road

- Location within Greater London
- Type: Public Park
- Location: Gants Hill
- Nearest city: Ilford
- Coordinates: 51°34′14″N 0°4′16″E
- Area: 52 hectares (130 acres)
- Created: 1899; 127 years ago
- Owner: Redbridge
- Operator: Vision RCL
- Open: 8am to Dusk
- Designation: Listed Park
- Public transit: Gants Hill; Ilford

Valentines Park is a 52-hectare (130-acre) park, south of Gants Hill, it is the largest green space in the London Borough of Redbridge. The park was originally the grounds of Valentines Mansion, a residence built in 1696. Valentines Park holds a Green Flag Award and was voted one of the ten best parks in Britain in 2019.

The park, including Valentines Mansion, is managed on behalf of Redbridge Council by Vision RCL, a registered charity.

== History ==
Valentines Park was put together by various purchases and gifts of land, starting in 1898 and culminating in the 1920s.

=== Cranbrook Estate ===
In 1899 the Cranbrook Estate, which now makes up an area in the west of the park, was about to be sold for housing. The Municipal Borough of Ilford had acquired its first section of parkland a year previously and was keen to enlarge its size as soon as land became available. Local officials believed that, unless an area of "relaxation and pleasure" was retained for the growing urban population, all traces of a rural Ilford could be lost. The park was opened in the same year under the name of Cranbrook Park.

=== Valentines Mansion ===
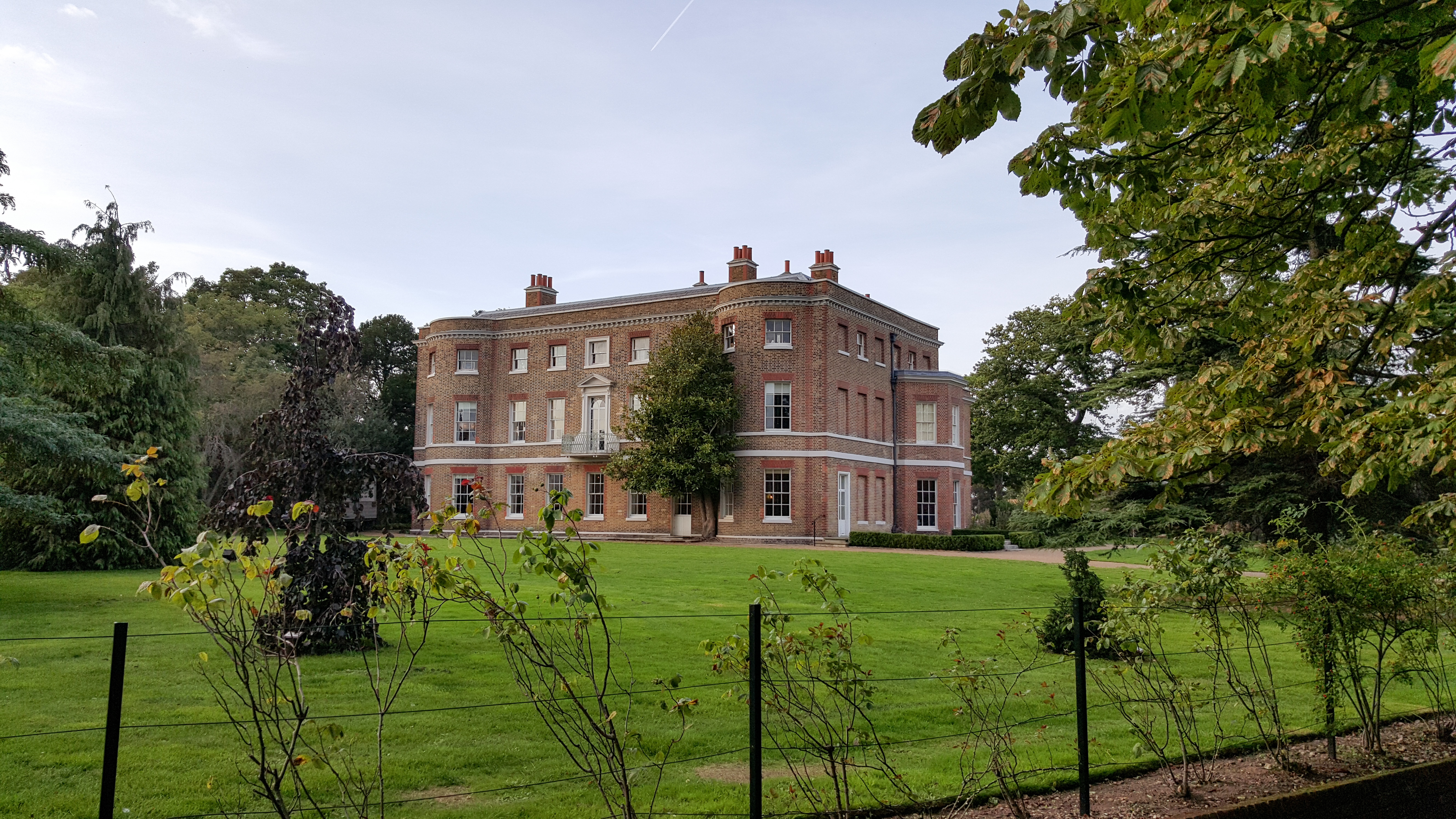
Valentines Mansion viewed from the back

Valentines Mansion was built in 1696 for Lady Tillotson, the widow of John Tillotson, Archbishop of Canterbury. For twenty years until around 1780 it was the family home of Sir Charles Raymond who had considerable interests in the East India Company as a ship owner and later became a banker. The house remained a family house until Sarah Ingleby, its last inhabitant, died on 3 January 1906. Following the death of the mansion's owner the local council acquired the remainder of its grounds and expanded the park. It is now a Grade II listed building.

=== Cricket Grounds ===
County Cricket was first played at Valentines Park in Ilford in 1922 and a pavilion was completed a year later after Mrs Ingleby, who owned 136 acres of land surrounding it, donated the venue to Ilford CC. The first ever county match to be played on a Sunday was played there on 15 May 1966 between Essex and Somerset, with 6,000 spectators attending.

== Features ==
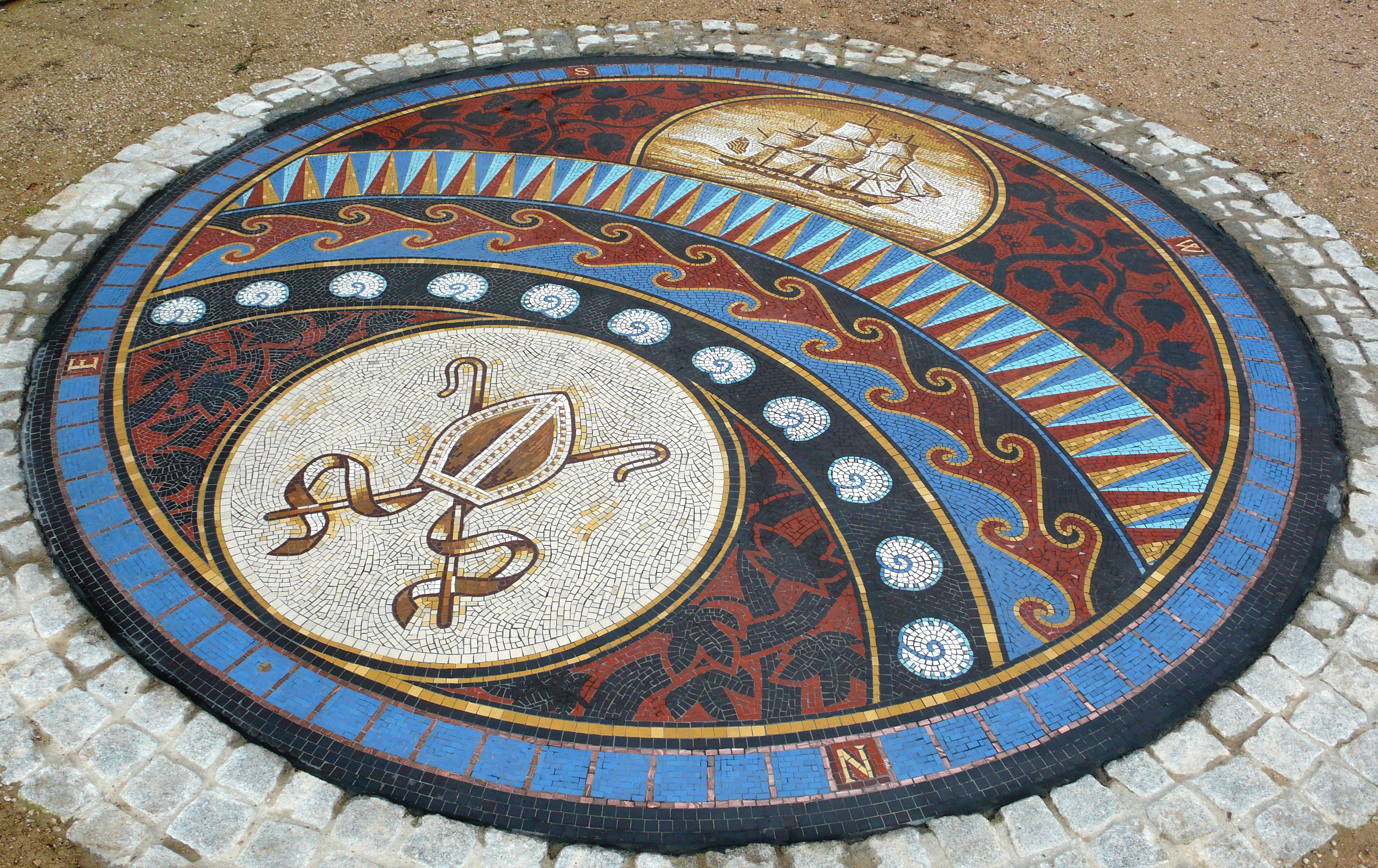
Bishops Walk Mosaic in Valentines Park. Designed and made by mosaic artist Gary Drostle

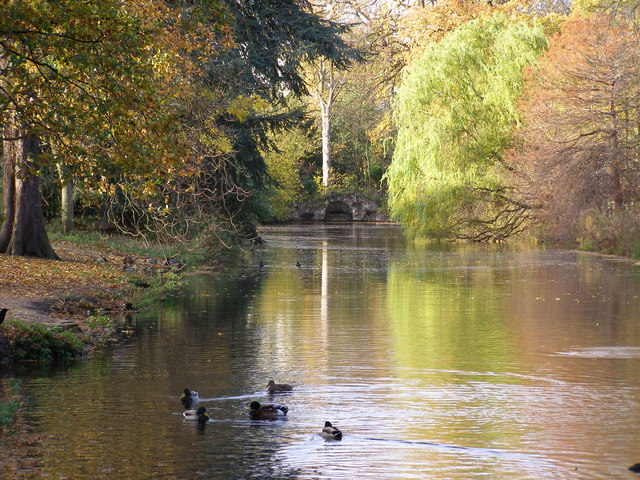
A view of the upper lake in Valentines Park

During 2007–2008 Valentines Park underwent an extensive renovation financed by the Heritage Lottery Fund and by the owners, Redbridge London Borough Council. The survival of formal Rococo features in a suburban park have given the park great heritage value, the park itself is Grade II Listed with several constructions in the park also holding listed status such as the Gardeners Cottage (Grade II) and the railings and gates (Grade II*).

Valentines Mansion (Grade II*) is now open to visit as a historic house and is hired out as a wedding venue.

Some of the parks other features include:

- Boating Lake
- Bandstand
- Children's Play Area
- Cricket Grounds
- Cycle routes
- Dog Exercise Area
- Fitness Equipment
- Picnic Area
- Tennis Court
- Parkrun route
- Public Toilets
- Walled Garden

The park previously had a lido but this was demolished in 1995.

Redbridge Council approved a new Swimming Lido with 25 metre swimming lanes in June 2024. The Lido is estimated to open sometime after August 2025. It will include an indoor gymnasium, dance studio, changing facilities and café. It is planned to be built on the original Lido position.

== Ecology ==
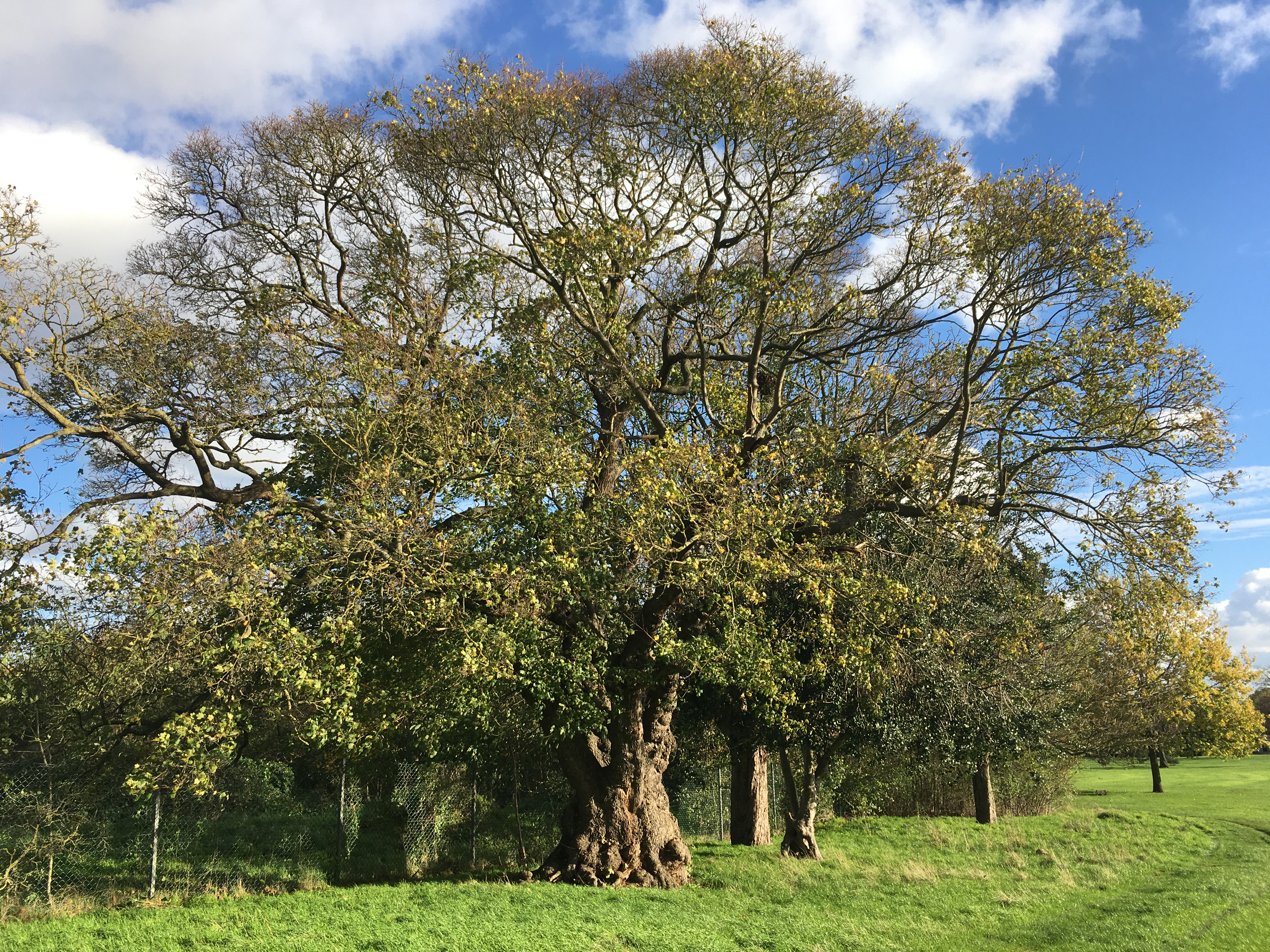
The Field Maple, a Great Tree of London, thought to have been planted in the 17th century

Valentines Park has a number of mature trees (including tulip trees, Scots pine, horse chestnuts, limes, and cedars of Lebanon) large yuccas, and manicured beds of shrubs other plants. The park is popular with birdwatchers and the species that have been spotted there include Marsh Tits and Turtle Doves. It is also home to the Valentines Park Field Maple, planted in the 17th century and one of the Great Trees of London.

== In popular culture ==
Valentines Park is one of parks claimed to be the subject of the Small Faces hit, Itchycoo Park.

It was the filming location of season 2 of The Great British Bake Off.
