= Woodcot (1786 EIC ship) =

History

Great Britain
- Name: Woodcot
- Namesake: Woodcote
- Owner: Voyage #1:John Durand; Voyages #2-4:John Hodson Durand; Voyage #5:Robert Wigram.
- Operator: British East India Company
- Builder: Wells, Deptford
- Launched: 21 December 1786

United States
- Name: Berkshire
- Acquired: c.1799 by purchase of a prize
- Fate: Unknown as of January 2023

General characteristics
- Tons burthen: 802, or 80247/94 (bm)
- Length: Overall:143 ft 5 in (43.7 m); Keel:115 ft 10 1/4 in (35.3 m)
- Beam: 36 ft 1 in (11.0 m)
- Depth of hold: 14 ft 9 in (4.5 m)
- Propulsion: Sail
- Complement: 1795:100; 1797:99
- Armament: 1795:20 × 9-pounder guns + 12 × 18-pounder carronades; 1797:24 × 9&4-guns + 2 carronades
- Notes: Three decks

Woodcot (or Woodcote) was launched in 1786 as an East Indiaman for the British East India Company (EIC). She made four voyages for the EIC. The French captured her in 1798 at Tellicherry as she was homeward bound from her fifth voyage. American owners purchased her, renamed her Berkshire, and sailed her to Bombay in 1799.

== Career ==
=== EIC voyage #1 (1787–1788) ===
Captain Ninian Lowis sailed from The Downs on 12 March 1787, bound for Madras and China. Woodcot reached Johanna on 12 July and Madras on 12 August, before she arrived at Whampoa Anchorage on 11 December. Homeward bound, she crossed the Second Bar on 2 April 1788, reached St Helena on 12 August and Carrick Roads on 31 October, and arrived at The Downs on 13 November.

=== EIC voyage #2 (1790–1791) ===
Captain Lowis sailed from The Downs on 20 February 1790, again bound for Madras and China. Woodcot reached Madras on 2 July and Penang on 8 August, and arrived at Whampoa on 12 September. Homeward bound, she crossed the Second Bar on 14 March 1791. The China fleet left Macao on 21 March. HMS Leopard and Thames escorted them as far as Java Head. Woodcot reached St Helena on 4 July, and arrived at The Downs on 28 August.

=== EIC voyage #3 (1793–1794) ===
Captain Lowis sailed from The Downs on 14 January 1793, this time bound for Madras and Bengal. Woodcot reached Madras on 30 May and arrived at Diamond Harbour on 29 June. She returned to Madras on 7 September, and was back at Diamond Harbour on 2 October. Homeward bound, she was at Saugor on 22 December and Madras on 30 January 1794. She left Madras on 21 February and reached St Helena on 1 May and Galway Bay on 20 July. She arrived at The Downs on 27 August.

=== EIC voyage #4 (1795–1796) ===
War with France had broken out in 1793 so Captain William Haig acquired a letter of marque on 6 May 1795. He sailed from Portsmouth on 18 June 1795, bound for Bengal. Woodcot arrived at Diamond Harbour on 27 October. Captain Haig died on 27 November and was buried in Calcutta. Homeward bound, Woodcott was at Saugor on 19 January 1796 and left on 17 May. She reached St Helena on 3 July and Crookhaven on 26 November. She arrived at the Downs on 11 December.

=== EIC voyage #5 (1797–Loss) ===
Captain Andrew Hannay acquired a letter of marque on 28 February 1797. He sailed from Portsmouth on 5 June, bound for Bombay, and was there in February 1798. Woodcot sailed for Tellicherry and on 3 April, on the way there, she picked up the survivors from Princess Amelia, which had caught fire at 14°01′N 74°19′E.

Woodcot arrived at Tellicherry on 16 April and took on a cargo of pepper. On 20 April Raymond too arrived from Bombay, and anchored about a mile away. Shortly thereafter the French frigate Preneuse came up, having been informed that there were two East Indiamen loading there. Préneuse launched an attack sailing between the two vessels and firing a broadside at each. An engagement developed between Raymond and Préneuse that lasted about 45 minutes, before Préneuse sailed and engaged Woodcot for some 20 minutes. Préneuse only fired small arms at Woodcot, which could not fire her guns because her decks were encumbered with 100 tons of pepper that she had loaded. The captains of both Raymond and Woodcot decided to strike as further resistance would be futile. Raymond had suffered three killed and four or five wounded, among them a woman passenger grazed by a splinter. Casualties on Préneuse were of the same order.

The next day the French, under a flag of truce, sent the captains, crews, and passengers of both ships ashore at Tellicherry with their baggage. At daylight on 22 April both Raymond and Woodcot sailed westward under prize crews. Early reports were that Woodcot had sunk; these reports were not correct.

The EIC put a value of £20,621 on the cargo that it had lost on Woodcot; the value of the cargo that it had lost on Raymond, which had not had time to take on cargo at Tellicherry, was £8,963.

== Postscript ==
Woodcot and Raymond were reported to have been at Île de France in September. The French apparently sold Woodcote to American owners who named her Berkshire. Captain White sailed her from Île de France on 26 February 1799 and she arrived at Bombay on 29 April. Her subsequent fate is currently obscure.
