= Coquille-class frigate =

Class overview
- Name: Coquille
- Builders: Rochefort
- Operators: French Navy; Royal Navy
- Completed: 5

General characteristics
- Type: frigate
- Displacement: 1,180 tonneaux
- Tons burthen: 590 port tonneaux
- Length: 44.7 m (147 ft)
- Draught: 5.3 m (17 ft)
- Propulsion: Sails
- Armament: UD: 28 × 12-pounder long guns; SD: 12 × 8-pounder long guns

The Coquille class (or Patriote class) was a group of five 40-gun frigates designed by Raymond-Antoine Haran.

- Coquille

Builder: Bayonne
Ordered: May 1793
Launched: October 1794
Fate: captured by the Royal Navy October 1798, burned by accident December 1798

- Sirène

Builder: Bayonne
Ordered: June 1794
Launched: 1795
Fate: damaged in action and hulked March 1808, broken up 1825

- Franchise

Builder: Bayonne
Ordered: August 1794
Launched: 17 October 1797
Fate: captured by the Royal Navy May 1803, sold for break up 1815

- Dédaigneuse

Builder: Bayonne (Constructeur: Jean Baudry)
Ordered: June 1794
Launched: December 1797
Fate: captured by the Royal Navy January 1801, sold for break up 1823

- Thémis

Builder: Rochefort
Ordered:
Launched: 13 August 1799
Fate: captured by the Royal Navy June 1814

== Bibliography ==
- Winfield, Rif and Roberts, Stephen S. (2015) French Warships in the Age of Sail 1786-1861: Design, Construction, Careers and Fates. Seaforth Publishing. ISBN 978-1-84832-204-2.
