= HSwMS Prins Gustaf =

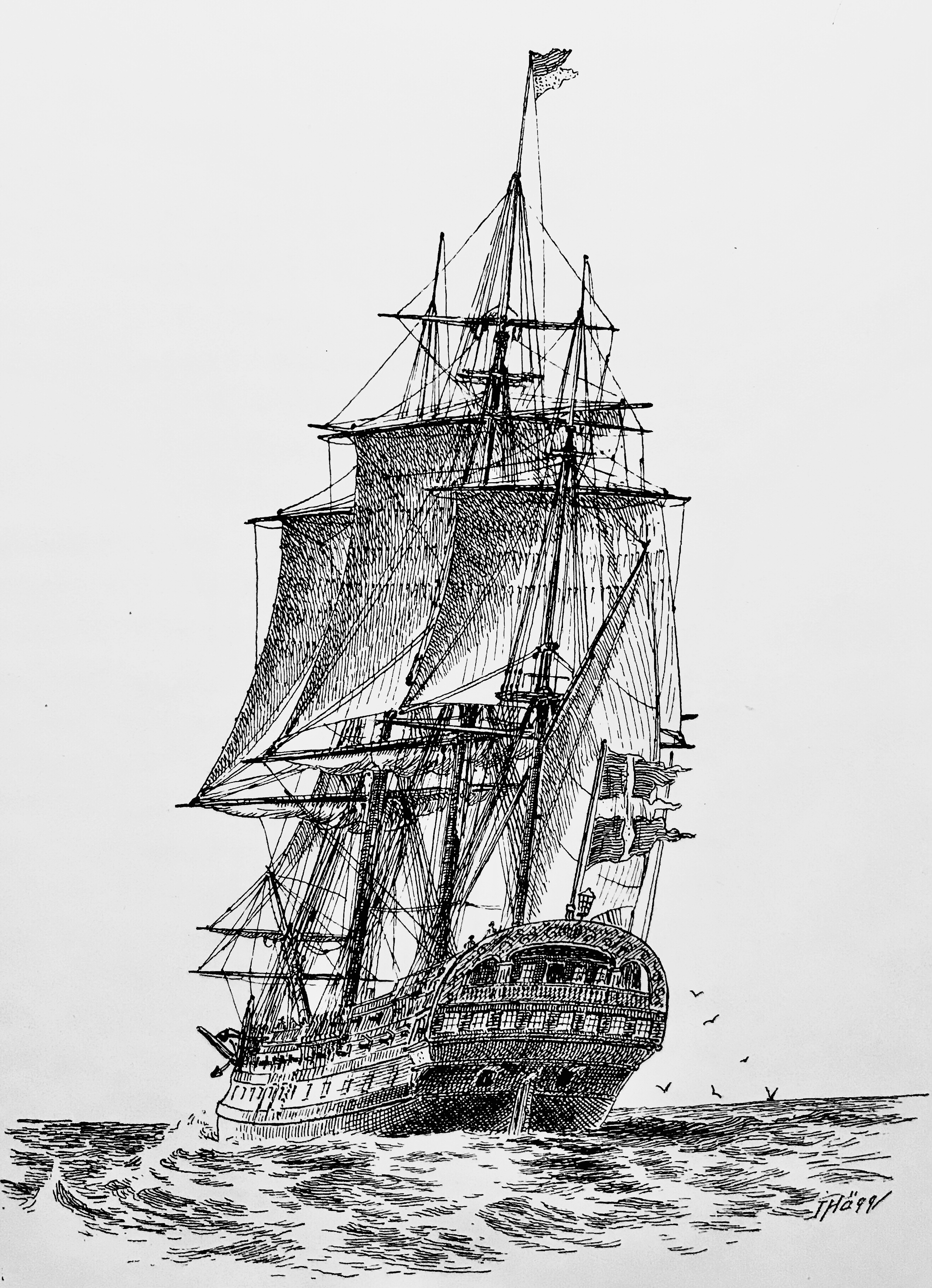
- Prins Gustaf under sail. Drawing by Jacob Hägg.

History

(1758–1788) (1788–1797)Sweden → Russia
- Name: Prins Gustaf
- Namesake: Crown Prince Gustav (later Gustav III)
- Builder: Karlskrona Naval Shipyard
- Laid down: 28 August 1756
- Launched: 6 November 1758
- Fate: Captured by Russia in 1788 after the Battle of Hogland, sank under Russian flag in 1797
- Notes: Designed by Gilbert Sheldon

General characteristics
- Type: Ship of the line
- Displacement: 2,400 tons
- Length: 47.5 m (155 ft 10 in)
- Beam: 12.46 m (40 ft 11 in)
- Draft: 6.38 m (20 ft 11 in)
- Armament: 68 guns on two gun decks

HSwMS Prins Gustaf was a ship of the line in the Royal Swedish Navy, named after Crown Prince Gustav, later King Gustav III. The ship was constructed under the supervision of master shipbuilder Gilbert Sheldon at the Karlskrona Naval Shipyard and launched on 6 November 1758. Her armament included 68 guns of various calibers distributed across two gun decks.

At the beginning of the Russo-Swedish War of 1788–1790, Prins Gustaf was part of a Swedish squadron sent to the Gulf of Finland in the summer of 1788 to threaten Saint Petersburg. On 17 July 1788, the Swedish and Russian fleets met at the Battle of Hogland. As the lead ship in the Swedish vanguard, Prins Gustaf became isolated during a maneuver and was surrounded by Russian ships of the line. Despite being outnumbered, her captain, Colonel Hans Fredrik Wachtmeister, refused to surrender and resisted fiercely for several hours. The ship was only forced to strike her colors when her ammunition was nearly exhausted and a quarter of her crew was incapacitated.

Following the battle, Prins Gustaf was taken to the Russian naval base at Kronstadt. She sank off "Drommel", Norway while in Russian service on 4 October 1797. Her crew survived.

== See also ==
- List of Swedish ships of the line
