= French frigate Coquille =

French frigate

History

France
- Name: Patriote
- Namesake: Seashell
- Builder: Bayonne
- Laid down: May 1793
- Launched: October 1794
- In service: April 1795
- Renamed: Coquille on 30 May 1795
- Captured: 12 October 1798

Great Britain
- Name: HMS Coquille
- Acquired: 12 October 1798
- Fate: Burned 14 December 1798

General characteristics
- Class & type: Coquille-class frigate
- Displacement: 1,180 tonneaux
- Tons burthen: 590 port tonneaux; 898 bm
- Length: 43.8 m (143 ft 8 in)
- Beam: 11.4 m (37 ft 5 in)
- Draught: 5.3 m (17 ft 5 in)
- Depth of hold: 3.6 m (11 ft 10 in)
- Propulsion: Sails
- Sail plan: Ship
- Complement: 209 (peace) & 282 (war)
- Armament: UD: 28 × 12-pounder long guns; SD: 12 × 6-pounder guns

Coquille was a 40-gun frigate of the French Navy, lead ship of her class, and launched in 1794. The Royal Navy captured her in October 1798 and took her into service as HMS Coquille, but an accidental fire destroyed her in December 1798.

== French career and capture ==
Built as Patriote, she was renamed Coquille on 30 May 1795.

On 20 March 1796 she was under the command of lieutenant de vaisseau Chesnneau. While she was escorting a convoy from Brest to the Île-d'Aix roads she encountered a British squadron near Audierne. The British squadron was under the command of Captain Sir John Borlase Warren in Pomone, and included Anson, Artois and Galatea. They engaged the French squadron escorting the convoy near the Bec du Raz. The British captured four brigs from the convoy and Warren instructed the hired armed lugger Valiant to take them to the nearest port. (The four brigs were Illier, Don de Dieu, Paul Edward, and Félicité.)

The British squadron then engaged the French warships escorting the convoy but were not able to bring them to a full battle before having to give up the chase due to the onset of dark and the dangerous location. Galatea was the only vessel in the British squadron to suffer casualties; she lost two men killed and six wounded. The store-ship Etoile, under the command of lieutenant de vaisseau Mathurin-Théodore Berthelin, struck. She was armed with thirty 12-pounder guns and had a crew of 160 men. Four French frigates (Coquille among them), a corvette, a brig, and the rest of the convoy escaped.

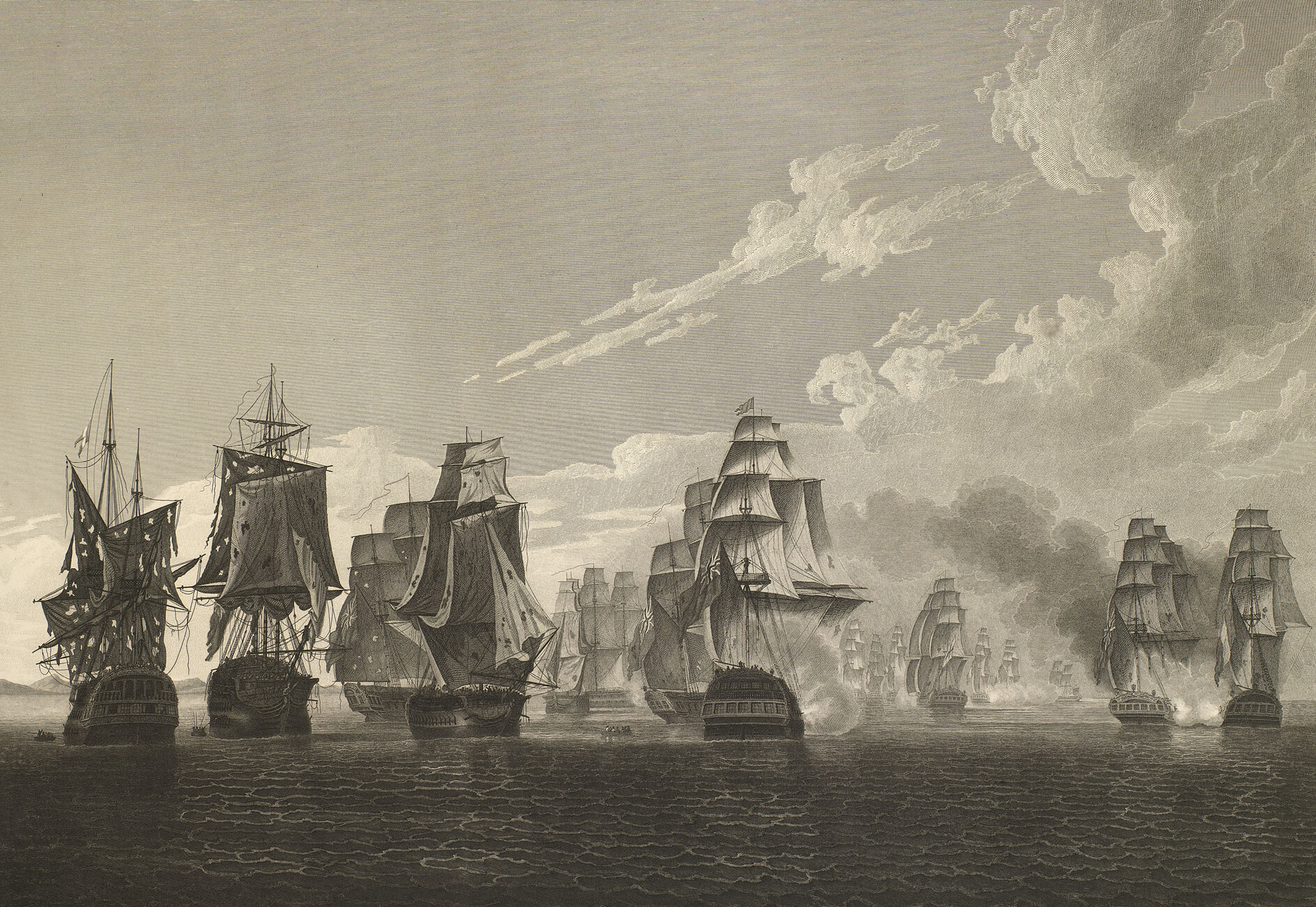
Coquille at the Battle of Tory Island

On 12 October 1798, Coquille took part in the Battle of Tory Island, where she was captured by the British. She was armed with 40 guns, and had a crew of 580 men, under the command of Captain Deperon (actually Léonore Depéronne). She had lost 18 men killed and 31 wounded in the battle. The prize crew was under the command of Lieutenant Charles Dashwood. Because of the frigate's damaged state and the weather, Dashwood first sailed Coquille to Belfast for some refitting. He then sailed her to Plymouth.

== Fate ==
The Royal Navy subsequently commissioned her as HMS Coquille. Coquille was in the Hamoaze on 14 December 1798 when an accidental fire broke out. With few crew on board the fire spread rapidly. To keep the fire from spreading to other vessels, she was towed to a nearby mudbank and left there for the fire to burn out. While she burned to the waterline the fire nevertheless spread to the Scarborough brig Endeavour, which was carrying coal to Guernsey and had grounded on the mudbank. Endeavour was also destroyed. It is estimated that the fire cost her captors £10,000 in prize money. Although most of the crew were saved, 15 people are believed to have died in an explosion in the gunroom: 13 British naval personnel, a woman and a customs official. 20 of her crew were on shore on leave, and another 20 were taken off in boats. Several others may have died also. Gunpowder was involved in the loss, and it must have been "concealed for some improper purpose" as the prize agents always removed gunpowder immediately to forestall accidents.
