= HMS Magicienne =

Five ships of the Royal Navy have been named HMS Magicienne. The origins of the name are from the French word for a female magician or sorceress and were used following the capture of the French frigate Magicienne in 1781.

- HMS Magicienne (1781) was a fifth-rate French frigate captured in 1781 and destroyed at the Battle of Grand Port in 1810.
- HMS Magicienne (1812) was a fifth-rate frigate built in 1812 and broken up in 1845.
- HMS Magicienne (1849) was a frigate built in 1849 and broken up in 1866.
- HMS Magicienne (1888) was a Marathon-class cruiser built in 1888 and sold in 1905.
- HMS Magicienne (J436) was an Algerine-class minesweeper built in 1944 and broken up in 1956.
