= Sir Robert Preston, 6th Baronet =

Scottish merchant and politician (1740–1834)

Sir Robert Preston
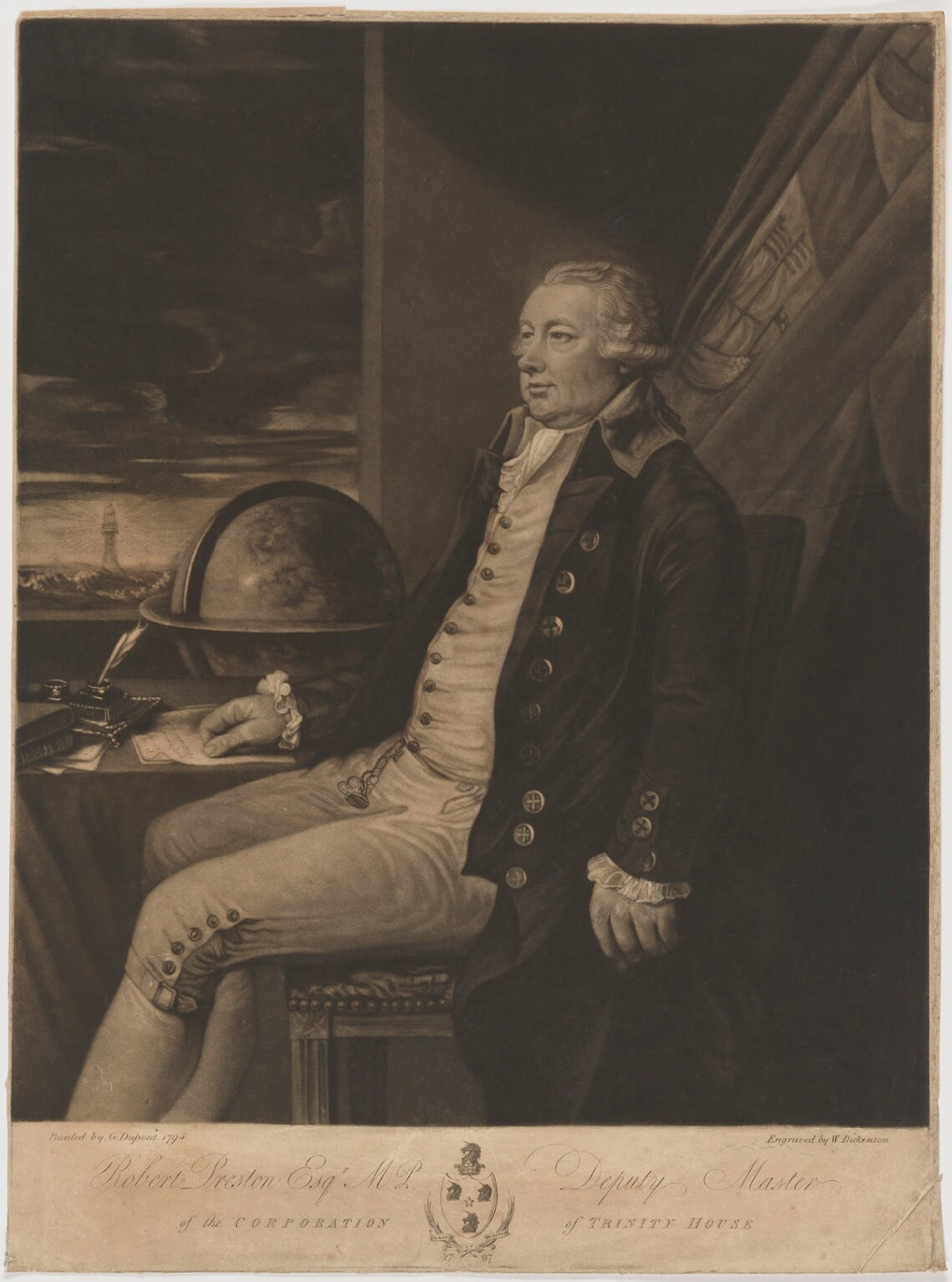
- Sir Robert Preston, portrait by William Dickinson

Member of Parliament for Dover
- In office 1784–1790

Member of Parliament for Cirencester
- In office 1792–1806

Personal details
- Born: 21 April 1740 Valleyfield, Fife, Scotland
- Died: 7 May 1834 (aged 94) Valleyfield, Fife, Scotland
- Spouse: Elizabeth Brown (m. 1790; died 1832)
- Parents: Sir George Preston, 4th Baronet of Valleyfield; Anne Cochrane

Sir Robert Preston, 6th Baronet (21 April 1740 – 7 May 1834) was a Scottish merchant and politician. After making a fortune in the trade with East India, he became the member of Parliament for the constituency of Dover from 1784 to 1790, and for Cirencester from 1792 to 1806. As Baronet of Valleyfield, he sought to improve his stately home, created expansive landscaped grounds, and directed industrial endeavours.

== Early life and career ==
Preston was born in 1740 as the eighth of nine children of Sir George Preston, 4th Baronet of Valleyfield in Perthshire, (Note: Note that while Valleyfield is in the modern county of Fife, the lands around Culross formed an exclave of Perthshire until the 1890s.) and his wife Anne. The Preston baronets had been in possession of the estate of Valleyfield since at least 1534. Because Preston had four older brothers, he did not expect to inherit the baronetcy and instead turned to trade.

His career with the East India Company began in 1758 at age 18 as Fifth Mate on the Streatham. Preston worked his way up the ranks, serving on the Clive first as Third Mate in 1761/62, then as Second Mate in 1764/65. He was promoted to captain the trading ship Asia on three voyages to the East Indies between 1767 and 1776, having been made a Commander of the Company in 1768. Preston returned to London for good in 1777, and entered a business partnership with his friend Charles Foulis, who had previously managed his voyages. Using funds accumulated in the services of the East India Company, Preston was now wealthy enough himself to take over the management of several ships for the company, among them the Busbridge, the General Eliott, and the Coutts. His ships made a combined 55 trips to the East Indies in the following years.

Together with Charles Foulis, Preston established himself as an insurance broker with premises in Old Jewry in the City of London, and both men became managers of the Sun Fire Office. Due to his connection to marine trade and his portly stature, Preston acquired the nickname 'Floating Bob'. His wealth was further boosted in the 1780s by inheriting the estate of his friend and colleague Foulis, who had made Preston his heir. In 1781 he was made an Elder Brethren of Trinity House, the official authority overseeing lighthouses in England, Wales, the Channel Islands, and Gibraltar, eventually becoming the corporation's Deputy Master from 1795 to 1803. Preston is likely to have been the sole investor in the Saint Ann slave voyage which, in 1783, purchased 360 enslaved people from West Central Africa and St. Helena and transported them to Kingston, Jamaica.

Preston served as Director of Greenwich Hospital from 1789 until his death.

=== Parliamentary career ===
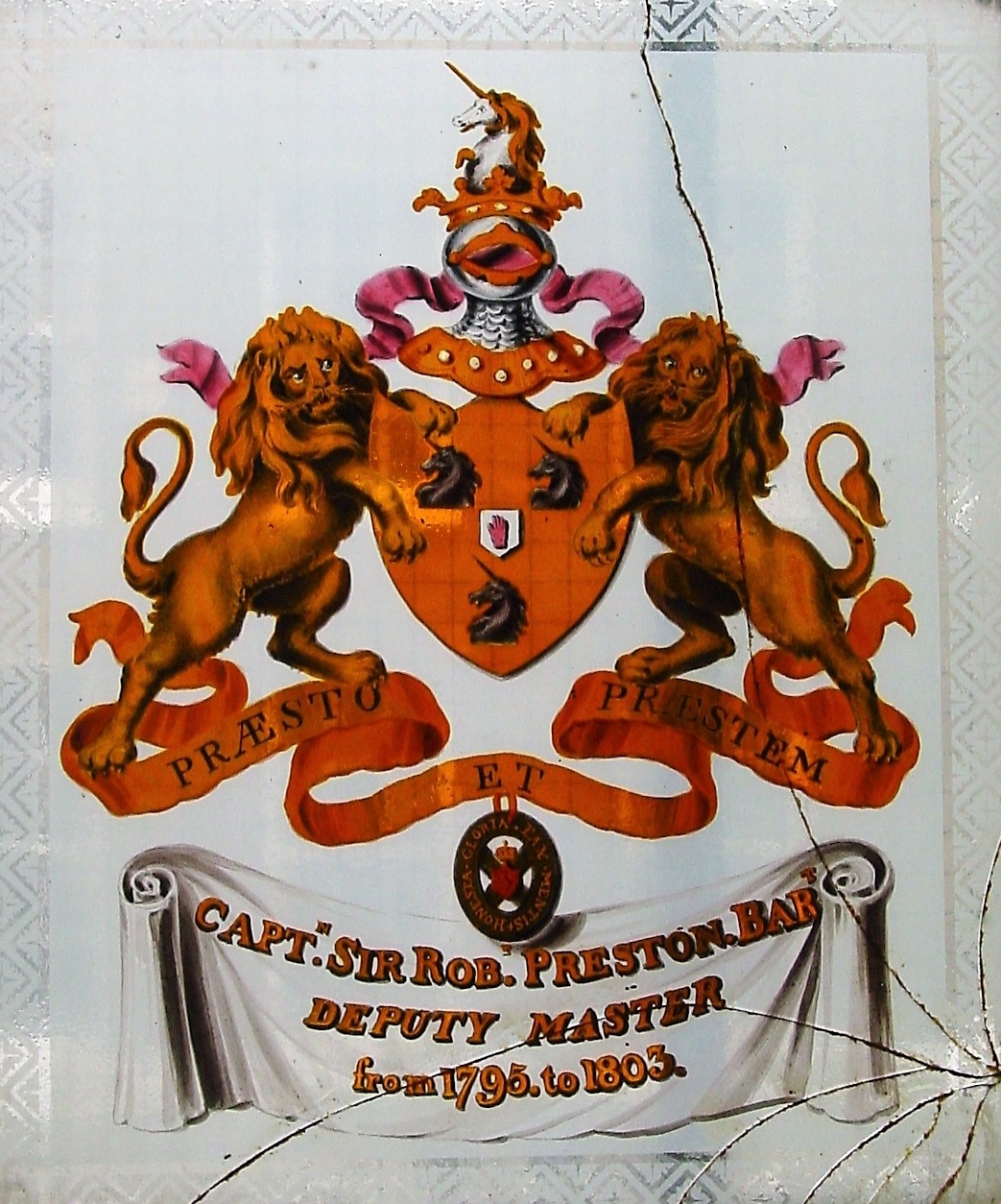
Preston's coat of arms in stained glass in Trinity House, London.

In the 1784 British general election, Preston won one of two seats in the parliamentary constituency of Dover for the governing Tory party of William Pitt the Younger. In the 1790 general election, his party replaced Preston on the ballot, leading him to make a late run at one of the seats in the Cirencester constituency. Although he only came third in the election, he successfully petitioned that illegal votes had been admitted for the second-placed candidate, and was subsequently seated in the House of Commons in 1792. Preston generally supported the governments of William Pitt, and repeatedly voted against the Addington government which took over from Pitt between 1801 and 1804. Despite his 20 years in parliament, the Hansard does not record him ever speaking on the floor.

Already in his 50s, Preston married Elizabeth Brown, daughter of a wealthy London merchant and 25 years his junior, on 27 April 1790. The match further increased his fortune due to Elizabeth's large dowry. Preston was well-connected in the political and artistic circles of his time in Edinburgh and London. He was friends with politicians William Pitt and Henry Dundas, diarist James Boswell, painters Alexander Nasmyth and J. M. W. Turner, and poet Sir Walter Scott. The latter said of Preston that he was "as big as two men, and eats like three".

== Later life in Scotland ==
In 1800, Preston unexpectedly inherited the baronetcy when his brother Charles, 5th Baronet, died childless, their three older brothers having predeceased their father. He sold his house in Downing Street to the government, which used it as one of the seats of the Colonial Office until 1875, and returned to Scotland to the family estate at Valleyfield House.

Sir Robert immediately set about developing his property. In 1801, he commissioned renowned English landscape designer Humphry Repton to improve Valleyfield's grounds. Valleyfield was Repton's only project in Scotland, for which he created ornate terraces and an expansive romantic landscaped park. In parallel, Preston expanded his land holdings in the parishes of Culross and Torryburn, and sought opportunities to develop his property industrially.

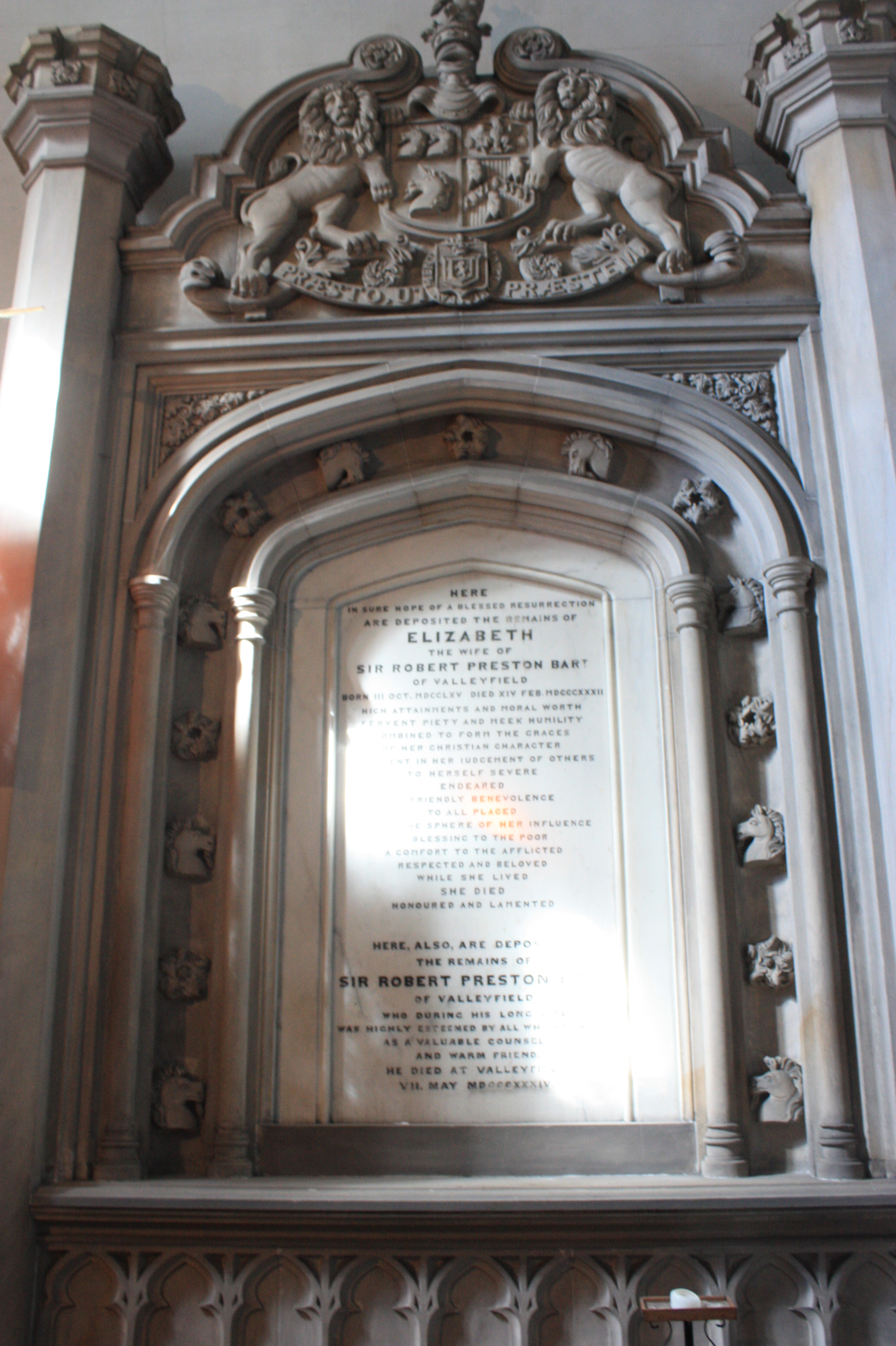
Grave of Sir Robert and his wife Elizabeth, Culross Abbey Parish Church

When traces of coal were discovered on Preston Island–a cluster of rocks in the Firth of Forth's intertidal zone off the coast of Valleyfield–in 1805, Sir Robert established a colliery there. In this Preston explicitly followed the example of Sir George Bruce of Carnock, who had created one of the world's first offshore coal mines in nearby Culross in 1617. After reclaiming land around the island through the construction of a sea wall, Preston used the coal to fuel the production of salt in salt pans until 1811.

In nearby Inverkeithing, Preston directed the development of Preston Crescent in the 1820s, a new road and residential site to the south of the town on the banks of the Inner Bay. Alongside a small stone bridge (today a C-listed building), a number of plain classical houses were built to accommodate retired sea captains. Nearby Preston Hill between Inverkeithing and Dalgety Bay is also named for Sir Robert, who erected a flagpole there intended to aid marine traffic.

Sir Robert donated some of his fortune to charitable works, such as financial help for the poor in Culross and Torryburn, and a hospital for elderly women in Culross. His large-scale building and industrial projects were envisaged as a lasting monument to his name.

Preston only retired from business when he was already 83 years old, and closed his last London office in Old South Sea House in 1823. He died aged 94 at Valleyfield House on 7 May 1834, and was buried in Culross Abbey Parish Church. As his marriage had been childless, on his death the direct male line of the Preston baronets became extinct, and the baronetcy passed to his cousin, also named Sir Robert Preston (the son of George Preston). Neither the House nor its landscaped gardens have survived to the present day. The value of Preston's assets at his death was estimated to be over £1 million (equivalent to £112 million in 2021).

== Notes ==
Parliament of Great Britain
Preceded by Sir John Henniker, Bt; John Trevanion	Member of Parliament for Dover; 1784–1790; With: Hon. James Luttrell 1784–1788; John Trevanion 1789–1790	Succeeded by Charles Pybus; John Trevanion
Preceded by Lord Aspley; Richard Master	Member of Parliament for Cirencester; 1792–1800; With: Lord Aspley 1792–1794; Michael Hicks-Beach 1795–1800	Parliament of the United Kingdom
Parliament of the United Kingdom
New office Parliament of Great Britain	Member of Parliament for Cirencester; 1801–1806; With: Michael Hicks-Beach	Succeeded by Michael Hicks-Beach; Joseph Cripps
Baronetage of Nova Scotia
Preceded by Charles Preston	Baronet (of Valleyfield); 1800–1834	Succeeded by Robert Preston
