= Transport vessels for the British expedition to the West Indies (1795) =

In 1795 Admiral Hugh Cloberry Christian mounted an expedition to the West Indies. The expedition sailed on 6 October, 16 November, and 9 December, but weather forced the vessels to put back. The fleet finally successfully sailed on 20 March to invade St Lucia, with troops under Lieutenant-General Sir Ralph Abercromby. St Lucia surrendered to the British on 25 May. The British went on to capture Saint Vincent and to put down Fédon's rebellion in Grenada.

Among the transport vessels of the expedition were 16 chartered from the British East India Company (EIC).

Ship	Master	Notes
Britannia	Barrow	
Contractor	Whyte	Sailed from the Cape of Good Hope
Duke of Montrose	Burt	
Dutton	Sampson	Wrecked on 26 January 1796 at Plymouth
Ganges	Pile	
General Eliott	Langhorne	
Houghton	Robert Hudson	
King George	John Fam Timins	
Middlesex	Ramsden	Returned via Barbados where she picked up a cargo; wrecked in August 1796 coming up the Thames
Phoenix	Wemys (or Wemyss) Orrok	
Ponsborne	James Clifford	Wrecked after landing her troops
Raymond	Henry Smedley	
Rose	Smyth	
Sir Edward Hughes	Urmston	James Urmston was Commodore for the EIC contingent
Sulivan (or Sullivan)	Sampson Hall	
Valentine	Henry Hughes	Sold for breaking up on her return

In addition to the vessels hired from the EIC, the expedition used a number of vessels belonging to the Transport Board on either long-term or short-term contracts.

- Alexander
- Betsey
- Brothers
- Catherine
- Concord
- Countess of Trautsmansdorff
- Crown
- Eagle
- Elizabeth
- Enterprize
- Fowler
- Galatea (Note: Galatea, of 332 tons (bm) was launched at Whitby in 1793. She became a West Indiaman. A French privateer captured her in 1801 in sight of Jamaica.)
- Golden Grove
- Hardy's
- Hope
- Horn
- Polly
- Rambler
- Sally
- Somerset
- Success
- Swan
- Swansea
- Thomas & Mary
- Three Sisters
- Travellor
- Ulysses
- Vine
- William Beckford

== Other ==
- Prince George

Mentioned in The Times:

- Jane
- Lady Penrhyn
