= Preston baronets of Valleyfield (1637) =

Escutcheon of the Preston baronets of Valleyfield

The Preston baronetcy, of Valleyfield in the County of Perth, was created in the Baronetage of Nova Scotia on 13 March 1637 for George Preston, the son of Sir John Preston and his wife Grizel Colville. The baronetcy came with a grant of 16,000 acres (6,500 ha) in Nova Scotia.

The 5th Baronet sat as Member of Parliament for Dysart Burghs. The title became dormant on the death of the 9th Baronet in 1873. George Preston, a great-nephew of the 1st baronet and father of the 7th baronet, was a lieutenant-general and colonel of the Scots Greys.

== Preston baronets, of Valleyfield (1637) ==
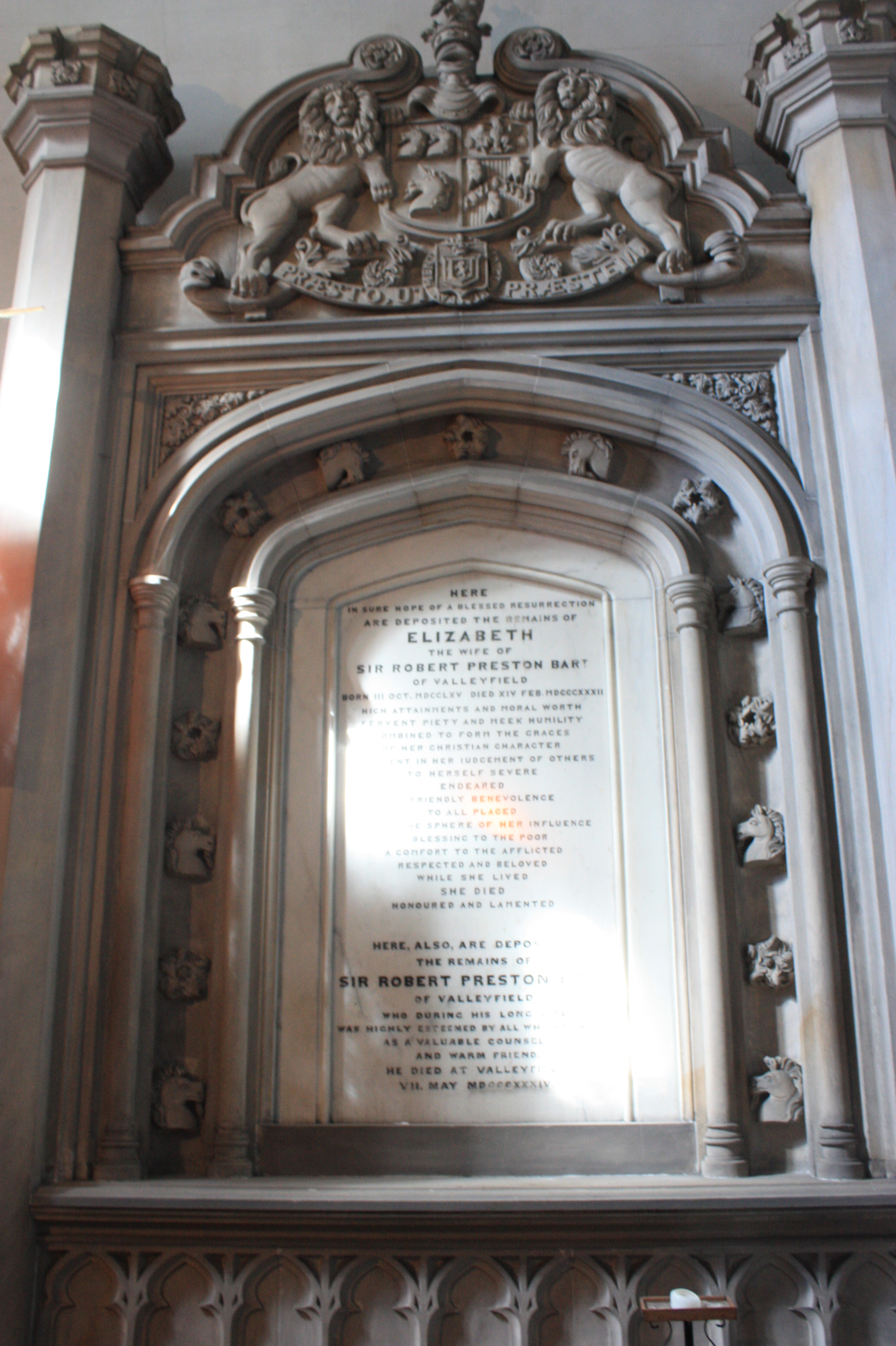
The grave of Sir Robert Preston, 6th Baronet of Valleyfield, Culross Parish Church

- Sir George Preston, 1st Baronet (died 1679)
- Sir William Preston, 2nd Baronet (c. 1703)
- Sir George Preston, 3rd Baronet (c. 1670–1741)
- Sir George Preston, 4th Baronet (died 1779)
- Sir Charles Preston, 5th Baronet (c. 1735–1800)
- Sir Robert Preston, 6th Baronet (1740–1834)
- Sir Robert Preston, 7th Baronet (1757–1846) son of George Preston
- Sir Robert Preston, 8th Baronet (c. 1780–1858)
- Sir Henry Lindsay Preston, 9th Baronet (1789–1873), brother of the 8th Baronet. He died unmarried.
