= Charles Preston =

British Army officer in Canada (c. 1735 – 1800)

Sir Charles Preston, 5th Baronet (c. 1735 – 23 March 1800) was a British Major who was stationed in Canada during the American Revolutionary War.

== Revolutionary War ==
He was ordered by Gen. Guy Carleton to delay the American advance on Montreal, and Quebec. He was in command of 662 men of the 26th Regiment, engineers, Canadians, and Indians. They held Fort Saint-Jean, at Saint-Jean-sur-Richelieu, Quebec, in 1775 when it came under siege by American General Richard Montgomery, and resisted multiple attacks by troops under command of Montgomery and Philip Schuyler. His troops held the fort in hopes of being rescued by reinforcements for two months before surrendering on the third of November 1775.

== After the war ==
On his return to Valleyfield, Fife, in 1784, he became Member of Parliament for Dysart, from 1774 to 1790. After his death, the Preston baronetcy passed to his brother, Robert.

== Legacy ==
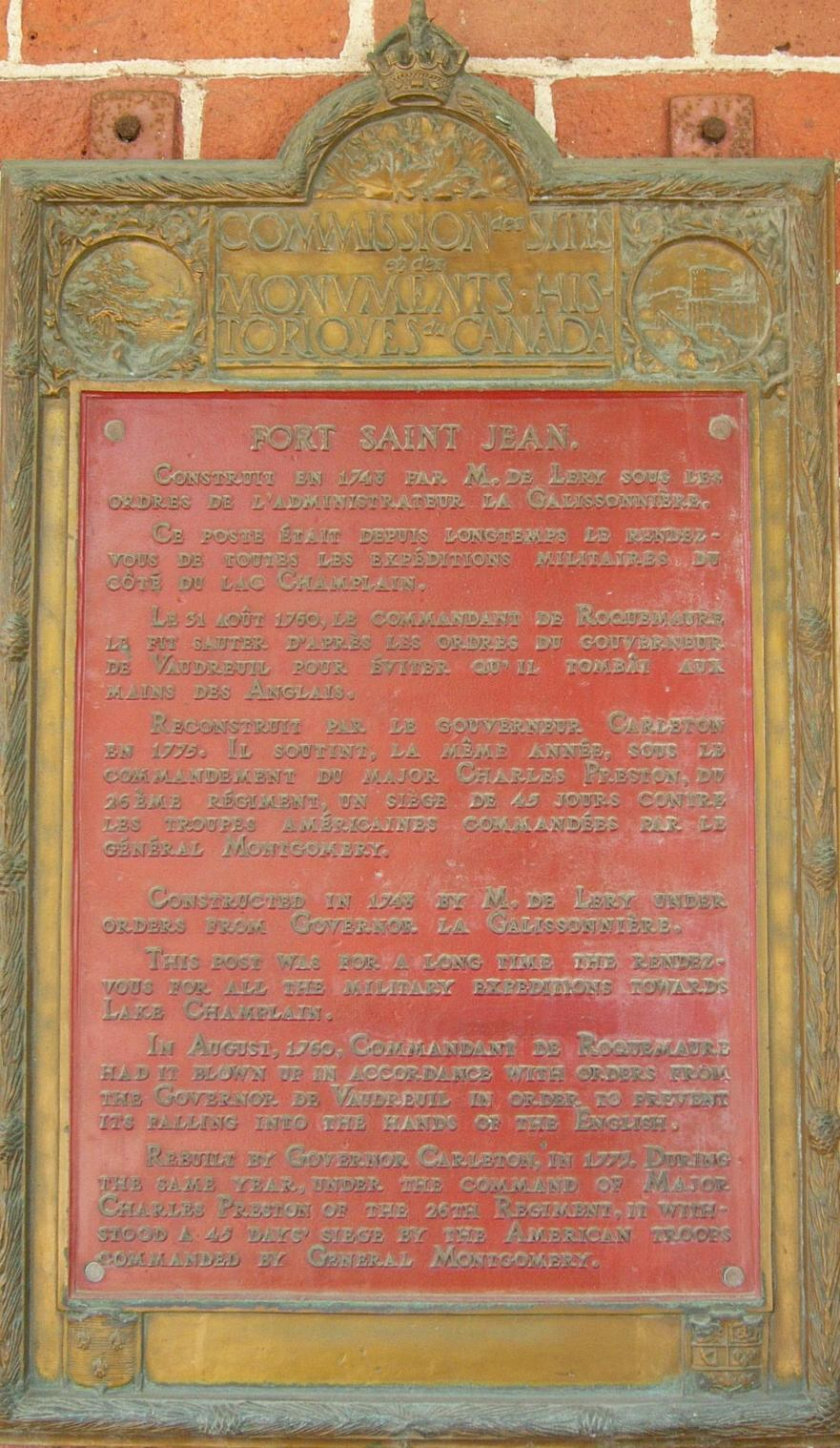
Historic plaque Fort-Saint-Jean 1926

Preston is mentioned in a Fort Saint-Jean plaque erected in 1926 by Historic Sites and Monuments Board of Canada at the Royal Military College Saint-Jean. "Constructed in 1743 by M. de Léry under orders from Governor la Galissonnière. This post was for all the military expeditions towards Lake Champlain. On 31 August 1760, Commandant de Roquemaure had it blown up in accordance with orders from the Governor de Vaudreuil in order to prevent its falling into the hands of the English. Rebuilt by Governor Carleton, in 1773. During the same year, under the command of Major Charles Preston of the 26th Regiment, it withstood a 45-day siege by the American troops commanded by General Montgomery.:

Parliament of Great Britain
Preceded by Sir John Henderson, Bt	Member of Parliament for Dysart Burghs; 1784 – 1790	Succeeded by Charles Hope
Baronetage of Nova Scotia
Preceded by George Preston	Baronet (of Valleyfield); 1779 – 1800	Succeeded by Robert Preston
