= Henry Bathurst, 3rd Earl Bathurst =

British politician (1762–1834)

The Right Honourable The Earl Bathurst KG PC
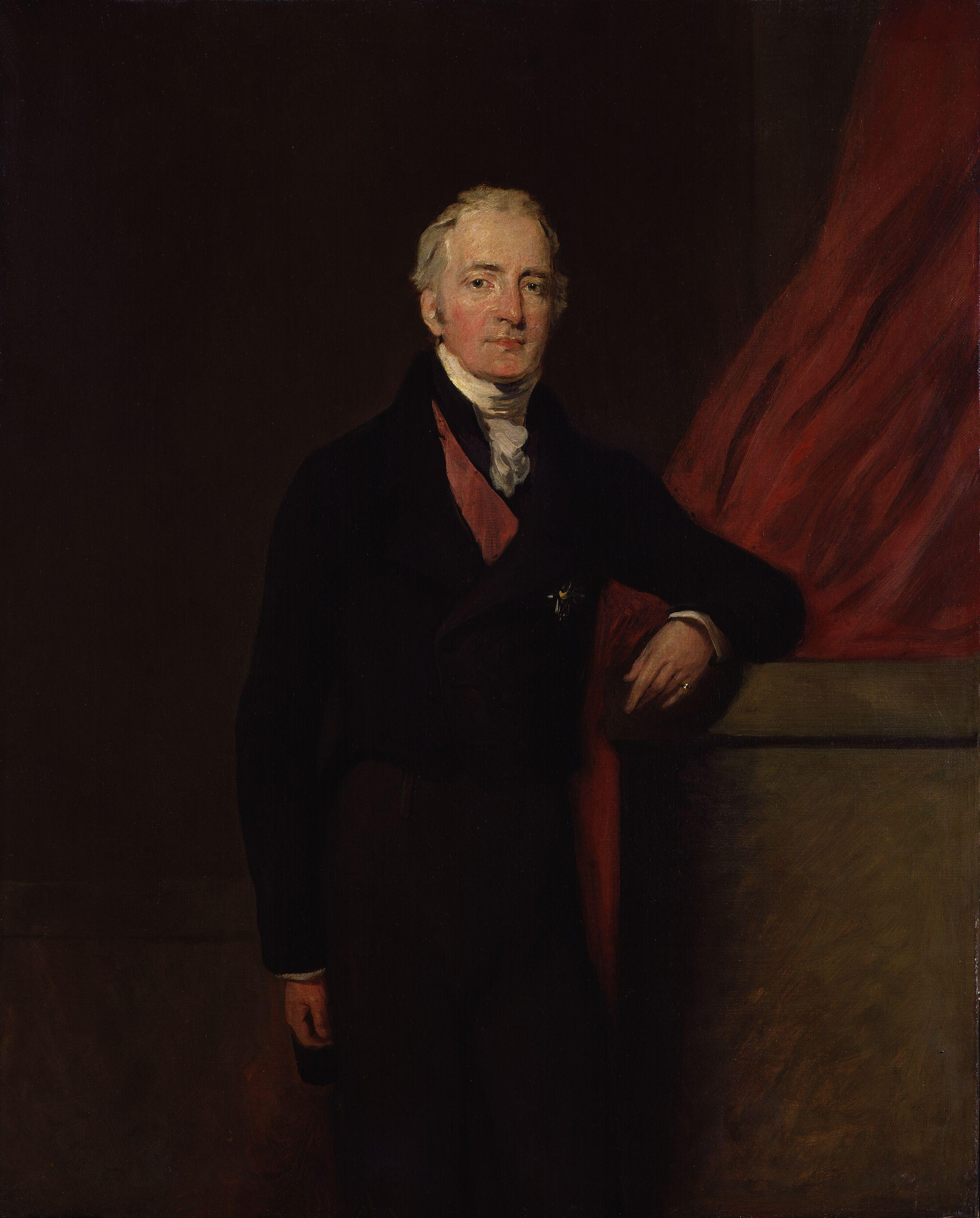
- Portrait by William Salter

President of the Board of Trade
- In office 31 March 1807 – 29 September 1812
- Monarch: George III
- Prime Minister: The Duke of Portland; Spencer Perceval; The Earl of Liverpool
- Preceded by: The Lord Auckland
- Succeeded by: The Earl of Clancarty

Foreign Secretary
- In office 11 October 1809 – 6 December 1809
- Monarch: George III
- Prime Minister: Spencer Perceval
- Preceded by: George Canning
- Succeeded by: The Marquess Wellesley

Secretary of State for War and the Colonies
- In office 11 June 1812 – 30 April 1827
- Monarchs: George III; George IV
- Prime Minister: The Earl of Liverpool
- Preceded by: The Earl of Liverpool
- Succeeded by: The Viscount Goderich

Lord President of the Council
- In office 26 January 1828 – 22 November 1830
- Monarchs: George IV; William IV
- Prime Minister: The Duke of Wellington
- Preceded by: The Duke of Portland
- Succeeded by: The Marquess of Lansdowne

Personal details
- Born: 22 May 1762 London
- Died: 27 July 1834 (aged 72) London
- Party: Tory
- Spouse: Lady Georgina Lennox (m. 1789)
- Children: 7
- Parent(s): Henry Bathurst, 2nd Earl Bathurst; Tryphena Scawen
- Education: Christ Church, Oxford

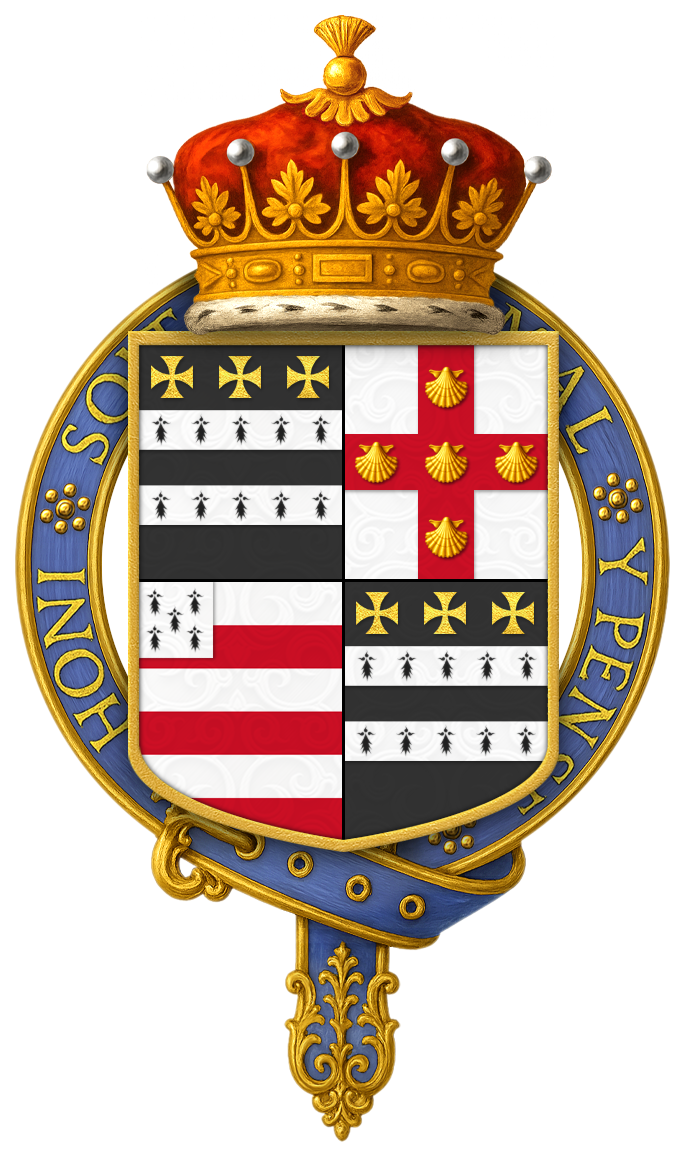
Quartered arms of Henry Bathurst, 3rd Earl Bathurst, KG, PC

Henry Bathurst, 3rd Earl Bathurst (22 May 1762 – 27 July 1834) was a British Tory politician. He was an MP for thirty years before ennoblement. A personal friend of William Pitt the Younger, he became a broker of deals across cabinet factions during the Napoleonic era. After the Napoleonic Wars, Bathurst was on the conservative wing of the Tory party.

== Background and education ==
Lord Bathurst was the elder son of Henry Bathurst, 2nd Earl Bathurst, by his wife Tryphena Scawen, daughter of Thomas Scawen. He was educated at Eton College from 1773 to 1778 and then up to Christ Church, Oxford. This college was considered the most academic at Oxford, and went up with his closest companions at Eton William Wyndham Grenville, Richard, Lord Wellesley, and Canon Bathurst, his cousin. He matriculated at Christ Church on 22 April 1779, at the age of sixteen. In 1781, he decided to embark on a Grand Tour of Europe. Without taking a degree, Bathurst left Oxford for Germany, where he travelled with Grenville. From Switzerland, he went to Italy, before moving north to Paris. On hearing that William Petty, 2nd Earl of Shelburne's government was challenged by a Fox–North coalition, Bathurst headed back to London in February 1783.

Immediately upon entering politics, he admired the patriotism and oratory of William Pitt.

It was through the ultra Tories Pitt and Wellington that he helped to gain recognition for the independence of Spain and Portugal; a policy decision that was influential on the Peninsular War. Later on, he would support Canada and Australia to establish 'white' dominion status, a legacy of what one historian has noted was the significant tenure of Secretary of War and Colonies before Palmerston in the 19th century. This fact is often overlooked since Bathurst was far from being a radical. The social diarist Maria Edgeworth, often alluded to by Jane Austen, wrote that he was an "old school dog". A "formalist", she thought who was "very much from that class".

== Political career ==
Lord Apsley was member of the British Parliament for Cirencester from July 1783, when he was elected the moment he turned 21 but refused to serve with the Whigs owing to a friendship with Tory William Pitt. A maiden speech bravely opposing the East India Bill was sufficiently impressive to bring down the government. On New Year's Eve 1783 the "mince pie" administration was without the young lord who was called away to Cirencester.

He was a junior civil lord of the Admiralty from 1783 to 1789 adhering firmly to the Pittites. At Carshalton a by-election missing voter agents Bathurst sent a former employee to aid Pitt's party cheering on his friends to help. The department included five lords, of whom all the others were MPs with 20 clerks and a secretary, Paul Stephens. He was assisted at the Navy Board by a "hard-working" Captain Charles Middleton.

Apsley contested the General Election in 1790 in his father's interest at Cirencester. Granted the reversion in 1786 from Lord Hardwicke to the tellership sinecure worth £2,700 per annum in the Commons as a lord of the treasury to 1791. A cousin Richard Hopkins vacated a junior post at the Treasury on 10 August 1789. He was therefore responsible for counting the government's votes on divisions in the chamber as well as recording expenditure. On 19 April 1791, he voted for repealing the slave trade in the first such vote on abolition. He was however not in favour of repealing the Test Act in Scotland. On 3 June 1791 he sat on the committee of Inquiry into the Prince of Wales' civil list and use of funds which were granted for the heir apparent's household at Carlton House. Yet by the 21st he had resigned to attend to his dying father at home.

As an unpaid Commissioner of the Board of Control from 1793, he was sworn to the Privy Council on 21 June. When awarded a salary by Pitt he rejected it for the sinecures that already obtained. He was again at the centre of cabinet government, but had failed to make his mark attending only a quarter of the meetings held every ten days. In the Commons, he was a diffident speaker, and not a great orator, which hampered advancement to the great offices of state. He relinquished office on his father's death in 1794. Lord Mornington offered the Governorship of Madras, but even on appointment, he withdrew from travelling to India, to which his wife objected strongly.

In 1801 he was a Joint clerk of the crown in Chancery worth £1,100 pa; a position that monitored claims and civil suits, giving him an eye for better administrative competence. At the height of Bonaparte's invasion scares he returned home to command the Cirencester Volunteer Cavalry. When Pitt was asked to resume as Prime Minister he chose his old friend again in May 1804, to be Master of the Mint in new offices built by Robert Smirke in July, while he worked on the entrance hall at Cirencester. He professed to Pitt he was "well provided for" after he had tried to bring the Pitt and Grenville factions to unite. He advised Grenville that the king would not tolerate Catholic officers in the Army during a national crisis, on the Whig's summons to the palace. His friend's death on 23 Jan 1806 prompted Bathurst to quit politics, but the Ministry of all the Talents was very brief.

Appointed as President of the Board of Trade in March 1807, Bathurst's first concern was Napoleon's Continental System against free trade. Yet he was defeated by cabinet 'hawks', who closed all British ports, invoking the Navigation Acts at home and abroad. Bathurst's response was the Orders-in-council of 11 and 25 November 1807. He was behind Admiral Berkeley's posting to Lisbon, and subsequent championing of John VI of Portugal as Emperor of Brazil. Obliged to concede Napoleon's Convention of Cintra, Canning criticised the policy as "the most disastrous."

In defending royalty when the Duke of York resigned as Commander-in-chief he refuted the allegation of corruption, being bribery for the sale of commissions. "There is no calculation to advantages...to the capture of the Island of Flushing" he told the vice-president at the Board. Bathurst also advised the King on Portland's resignation from ill health. For the two months from 11 October 1809 he was briefly in charge of the Foreign Office he imposed a travel ban to Portugal, withdrawing diplomat Henry Williams-Wynne. Thinking of the lines at Torres Vedras he sent the King a board of backgammon, a strategic victory.

He remained Master of the Mint during the ministries of the Duke of Portland and Spencer Perceval, only vacating these posts in June 1812 to become Secretary of State for War and the Colonies under Lord Liverpool; a position he retained until Liverpool resigned in April 1827.

Bathurst deserves some credit for improving the conduct of the Peninsular War, while it was his duty to defend the government concerning its treatment of Napoleon Bonaparte. Bathurst endorsed Sir George Prevost's policy in British North America when war broke out in 1812. He ordered the Provincial Marines to be replaced with Royal Navy personnel authorising the occupation of the Great Lakes; yet organized with the defence of Canada in mind. The strategy remained essentially defensive and underfunded until Napoleon I was sent to Elba in 1814; by which time it was too late. Bathurst refused to send large-scale reinforcements. However, when operations switched to the north-western forests and inlets of Vancouver Sound in British Columbia 20,000 troops arrived to prevent incursion over the border. The failure of the Plattsburgh Expedition destroyed Prevost's reputation among Royal Navy officers. He was recalled to face a court-martial on Bathurst's orders, but died in 1815.

When King George IV turned to George Canning to form a government following Liverpool's resignation, Bathurst, along with Wellington and Lord Eldon on the far right of the Tory party, who called themselves the 'Ultra Tories', refused to serve under him due to the new prime minister's humble origins, liberal policies and support for Catholic emancipation. When Wellington in turn was called to form a government a few months later in the aftermath of Canning's death, he opted for a middle-of-the-road cabinet and Bathurst had to contend with the relatively minor position of Lord President of the council.

== A High Tory ==
A close friend of Castlereagh's and Wellington's, Bathurst shared their view that the first responsibility of government was to try to preserve the established order both at home and overseas. He enjoyed sinecure incomes as Teller of the Exchequer and Clerk of the Crown and, as such, was a beneficiary of the 'old corruption' system loathed by radicals. He was a High Churchman and a High Tory, a significant Gloucestershire landowner, a lifelong supporter of agricultural interests and a supporter of the Corn Laws. As Colonial Secretary, he would be hostile both to the introduction of representative institutions, and to the development of a free press in Britain's possessions. While himself an efficient and conscientious bureaucrat, he ran the Colonial Office on traditional, paternalistic lines and overseas posting owed much to status, nepotism and family contacts. He appointed his brother-in-law the Duke of Richmond, who was in financial straits, Governor-General of Canada and sent out his son-in-law, Major General Sir Frederic Ponsonby, to be Governor of Malta. He appointed as Governor of Cape Colony Lord Charles Somerset, a son of his friend the Duke of Beaufort. On the other hand, while not an abolitionist, he was a friend of William Wilberforce and he pressed his colonial governors hard to improve the living conditions of Caribbean slaves.

=== Position regarding penal transportation ===
Bathurst reorganized the department with his capable Under-secretary Henry Goulburn. Blue books were introduced for the first time with new office routines. Goulburn's successor, Wilmot Horton was an admirer of practical good sense and discretion. Bathurst appears to have been personable, amused and capable of delegating tasks. To prevent a Tory split he supported Pitt's decision to return the Cape of Good Hope colony in Feb 1801, voted to keep the Aliens Act 1793 and wanted foreigners to carry passports. He accepted the Peace Treaty of Amiens in 1802 following Pitt's lead, whom Malmesbury said: "he looked up to".

In 1817 he dispatched a commission of inquiry to Australia to investigate the colony's use of transportation and treatment of convicts. John Bigge sent back three Reports recommending that more settlers should be sent to the colony, and therefore transportation should continue. Bathurst ordered changes to the administration of justice and land distribution in the colony. He was made Knight of the Garter in 1817, and he held several lucrative sinecures. The collapse of wages and economic depression since 1800 exercised the mind of the Board President

"When I paused over this scene of misery, unequalled in the history of civilised times, I felt naturally to demand, how it was possible to sustain existence in such circumstances, and whether it were not practicable to administer charitable aid?"

Rising unemployment brought a real sense of crisis to Bathurst's statement to the Lords. Much of the blame for importuned labourers begging in the streets was protectionism, Lord Brougham demanding on 13 March 1817, "a full and unsparing review of the whole commercial policy of this country". Also in 1817 he made a signal speech to the Lords governing the conditions under which Napoleon had been sent to St Helena in which he made it clear the hardship the former emperor was facing.

=== Position regarding the abolition of slavery ===
Bathurst's official position caused his name to be mentioned frequently during the agitation for the abolition of slavery, and with regard to this traffic, he seems to have been animated by a humane spirit. This is recognised in the naming of the town of Bathurst, Eastern Cape, which was renamed in memorial for a humanitarian gesture towards the settlers of Albany, and parliamentary censure of Lord Charles Somerset, its excessively punitive governor-general. The current capital of The Gambia, Banjul, was originally named Bathurst after the earl.

Bathurst was Lord President of the Council in the government of the Duke of Wellington from 1828 to 1830, and favoured the removal of the disabilities of Roman Catholics, although did not believe that it would improve the constitution and so voted against. He was however a sturdy opponent of the Reform Bill of 1832. The Earl, who had four sons and two daughters, died on 27 July 1834 at his London home, 16 Arlington Street, Piccadilly. He was buried in Cirencester Abbey's parish church. Charles Greville's much-quoted encomium is hardly flattering but remains largely because it was published in his Memoirs.

== Family ==
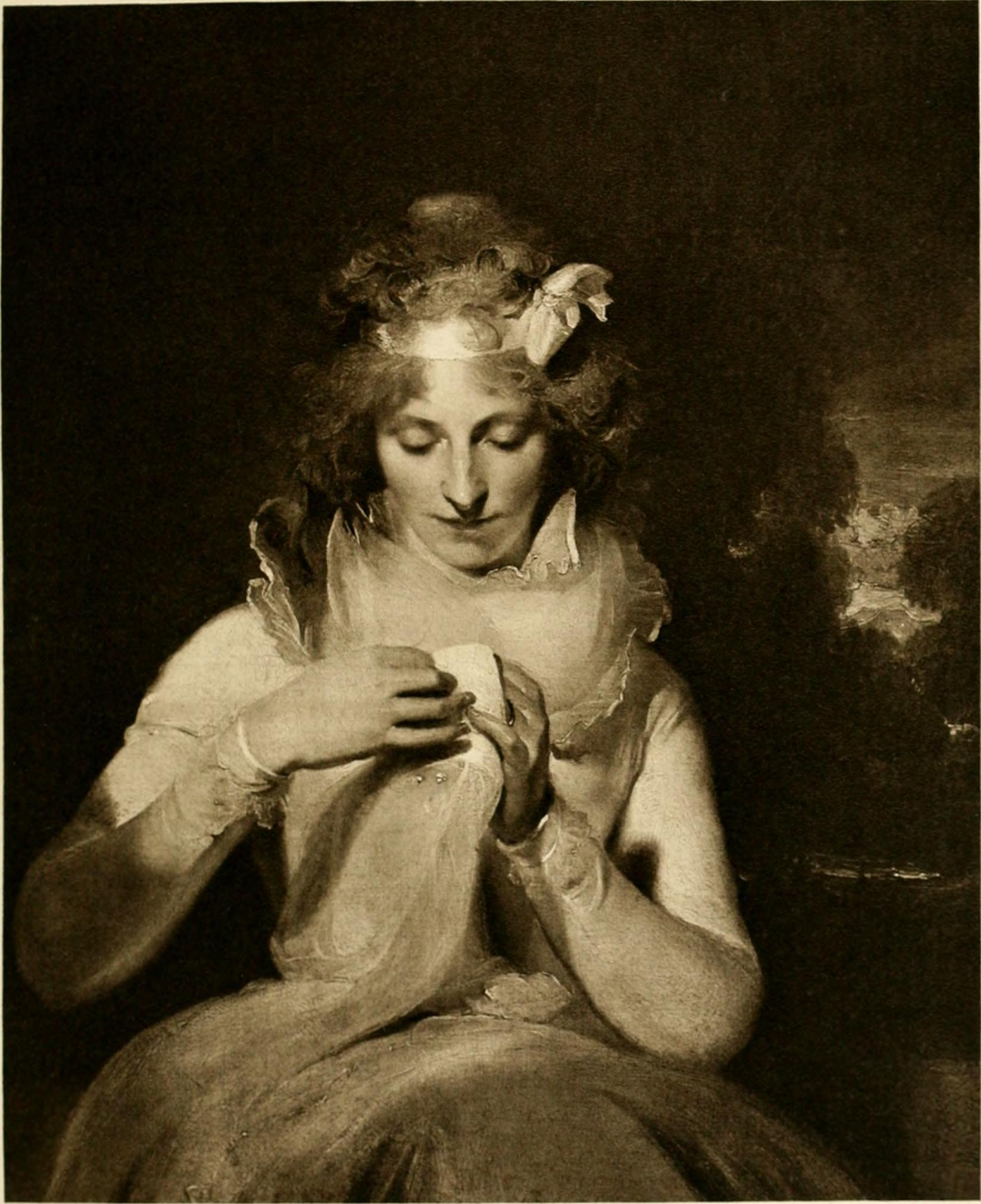
His wife Georgina Lennox, by Thomas Gainsborough

Lord Bathurst married Lady Georgiana, daughter of Lord George Henry Lennox, in April 1789. He died in July 1834, aged 72, and was succeeded in the earldom by his eldest son, Henry.

- Henry George (1790–1866)
- William Lennox (1791–1878)
- Louisa Georgina (1792–1874)
- Peter George Allen (1794–1796)
- Seymour Thomas (1795–1834)
- Emily Charlotte (1798–1877) married Frederick Ponsonby.
- Rev. Charles (1802–1842)

Lady Bathurst died in January 1841, aged 75.

=== Likenesses ===
Sir Thomas Lawrence was the court painter when Bathurst sat for his studio. Subsequent etchings were done in London, in 1810, by Thomas Phillips and Henry Meyer. One example was purchased by the National Portrait Gallery of Australia in Canberra.

There is a sculpture of Bathurst on the exterior of the Colonial Office in London.

== Legacy ==
Bathurst was portrayed by Christopher Lee in the South African television series Shaka Zulu.

Some places named after Bathurst

- Bathurst County, a county in New South Wales, Australia
- Bathurst, a regional city in New South Wales, Australia
- Bathurst Island, part of the Tiwi Islands, in Northern Territory, Australia
- Bathurst Island, an island in Nunavut, Canada
- Bathurst Street, a street in Toronto, Canada
- Bathurst, a city in New Brunswick, Canada
- Bathurst, a town in Eastern Cape, South Africa
- Bathurst, the capital city of The Gambia, now known as Banjul

== See also ==
- Second Portland ministry
- Spencer Perceval ministry

== Sources ==
- Thompson, Neville. "Bathurst, Henry, third Earl Bathurst (1762–1834)". Oxford Dictionary of National Biography (online ed.). Oxford University Press. doi:10.1093/ref:odnb/1696. (Subscription, Wikipedia Library access or UK public library membership required.)
- Arthur Aspinall, The Letters of King George IV 1812-1830, 3 volumes, (London 1938)
- Francis Bickley (ed.), Report on the manuscripts of Earl Bathurst, preserved at Cirencester Park, HMC, 76 (1923)
- Supplementary despatches (correspondence) and memoranda of Field Marshal Arthur, duke of Wellington, ed. A. R. Wellesley, second duke of Wellington, 15 vols. (1858–72)
- Despatches, correspondence, and memoranda of Field Marshal Arthur, duke of Wellington, ed. A. R. Wellesley, second duke of Wellington, 8 vols. (1867–80)
- N. D. McLachlan, 'Bathurst at the colonial office, 1812–27: a reconnaissance', Historical Studies [University of Melbourne], 13 (1967–9), 477–502
- N. Thompson, Earl Bathurst and the British empire (Barnsley 1999)
- G. E. Cokayne, The Complete Peerage of Great Britain and Ireland, vol.XIV (London 1912–1958)
- History of Parliament, Commons
- The Greville memoirs, 1814–1860, ed. L. Strachey and R. Fulford, 8 vols. (1938)
- The Times (29 July 1834)

=== Archives ===
- BL, 108 volumes of corresp. and papers, Loan 57
- Lord Bathurst, Cirencester Papers, 70 Letters
- Glos. RO, Cirencester MSS
- NL Scot., dispatches and papers received
- Surrey HC, secret service accounts
- Surrey HC, Goulburn Papers
- BL, corresp. with Lord Aberdeen, Add MS 43074–43260
- BL, corresp. with Sir William A'Court, Add MS 41511–41523
- BL, corresp. with Lord Grenville, Add MS 58944
- BL, corresp. with Lord Liverpool, Add MS 38247–38575
- BL, corresp. with Sir Hudson Lowe, Add MS 20111–20233, passim
- BL, corresp. with Sir H. Lowe, Add MS 49508, passim
- BL, corresp. with Sir Robert Peel, Add MS 40226–40398
- BL, corresp. with comte de Puisaye, Add MS 7981
- BL, corresp. with George Rose, Add MS 42773
- BL, corresp. with Lord Wellesley, Add MS 37288–37314, passim
- BL OIOC, corresp. with Mary Skelton, MS Eur. E 334
- CKS, corresp. with Lord Camden
- Royal Archives
- Cumbria AS, Carlisle, letters to Lord Lonsdale
- Derbys. RO, corresp. with Sir R. J. Wilmot-Horton (Cotton) Papers
- LPL, corresp. with Bishop Howley · Mitchell L.,
- NSW, letters to Sir Robert Wilmot Horton · Mount Stuart Trust Archive, Mount Stuart, Rothesay, letters to Lord Hastings
- NA Scot., corresp. with Lord Dalhousie
- NA Scot., letters to Sir Alexander Hope
- NL Scot., corresp. with Sir Alexander Cochrane and Thomas Cochrane
- NL Scot., corresp. with Sir Francis Graham
- NL Scot., corresp. with Lord Melville
- NL Scot., dispatches and letters to Lord Stuart De Rothesay
- PRONI, corresp. with Lord Castlereagh · Sandon Hall, Staffordshire, Harrowby Manuscript Trust, corresp. with Lord Harrowby
- TNA: PRO, letters to William Pitt, PRO 30/8
- U. Nott. L., letters to Lord William Bentinck
- U. Nott. L., letters to fourth duke of Newcastle
- U. Southampton L., letters to duke of Wellington [copies].
- U. Keele, Sneyd Papers
- U. NSW Aus, The Mitchell Lib., Bathurst Papers
- U. W Ontario, D.B.Weldon Lib., Bathurst Papers

=== Glossary ===
- BL - British Library
- OIOC - Oriental and India Office catalogue, in British Library
- CKS -
- Derbys RO - Derbyshire Record Office
- Surrey HC - Surrey History Centre
- NL Scot - National Library Scotland
- NA Scot - National Archives Scotland
- PRONI - Public Record Office of Northern Ireland
- U. Nott. L. - University of Nottingham Library
- TNA - The National Archives of UK at Kew, Richmond, Surrey.

Parliament of Great Britain
Preceded by James Whitshed; Samuel Blackwell	Member of Parliament for Cirencester; 1783–1794; With: Samuel Blackwell to 1785; Richard Master 1785–1792; Robert Preston from 1792	Succeeded by Michael Hicks-Beach; Robert Preston
Political offices
Preceded by John Smyth	Master of the Mint; 1804–1806	Succeeded by Lord Charles Spencer
Preceded by The Lord Auckland	President of the Board of Trade; 1807–1812	Succeeded by The Earl of Clancarty
Preceded by Charles Bathurst	Master of the Mint; 1807–1812	Succeeded by The Earl of Clancarty
Preceded by George Canning	Foreign Secretary; 1809	Succeeded by The Marquess Wellesley
Preceded by The Earl of Liverpool	Secretary of State for War and the Colonies; 1812–1827	Succeeded by The Viscount Goderich
Preceded by The Duke of Portland	Lord President of the Council; 1828–1830	Succeeded by The Marquess of Lansdowne
Peerage of Great Britain
Preceded by Henry Bathurst	Earl Bathurst; 1794–1834	Succeeded by Henry Bathurst
