= Henry Bathurst, 4th Earl Bathurst =

British peer and Tory politician

The Right Honourable The Earl Bathurst

Member of Parliament for Weobley
- In office January – October 1812 Serving with Lord George Thynne
- Preceded by: Lord George Thynne; Lord Guernsey
- Succeeded by: Viscount St Asaph; William Bathurst

Member of Parliament for Cirencester
- In office 1812–1834 Serving with: Michael Hicks-Beach (1812–1818); Joseph Cripps (1818–1834)
- Preceded by: Michael Hicks-Beach; Joseph Cripps
- Succeeded by: Joseph Cripps; Lord Edward Somerset

Personal details
- Born: 24 February 1790 Apsley House, London, England
- Died: 25 May 1866 (aged 76) Oakley Park, Cirencester, Gloucestershire, England
- Party: Tory
- Parents: Henry Bathurst, 3rd Earl Bathurst; Lady Georgina Lennox
- Education: Eton College
- Alma mater: Christ Church, Oxford

Henry George Bathurst, 4th Earl Bathurst (24 February 1790 – 25 May 1866), styled as Lord Apsley from 1794 to 1834, was a British peer and Tory politician.

== Background and education ==
Born at Apsley House, he was the eldest son of Henry Bathurst, 3rd Earl Bathurst, and his wife Lady Georgina, third daughter of Lord George Lennox. He was educated at Eton College and went then to Christ Church, Oxford, graduating with a Bachelor of Arts in 1811 and a Master of Arts three years later. In 1820, he received a Doctor of Civil Law degree from the University of Oxford.

== Career ==
Bathurst served as a clerk to the Teller of the Exchequer and in 1812, he was appointed a Commissioner of the India Board, a post he held for the next six years. He was elected to the House of Commons as one of two representatives for Weobley in January 1812, sitting until October the same year. He then represented Cirencester until 1834, when he succeeded his father in the earldom and entered the House of Lords.

On 24 January 1813 he was commissioned as Lieutenant-Colonel Commandant to raise the Royal Cotswold Local Militia at Cirencester.

He was one of the founders of the Royal Agricultural College in 1845.

== Death ==
Bathurst died at his country residence, Oakley Park, Cirencester, on 25 May 1866 aged 76 after a long illness. His body lay in state until it was interred on the estate in front of thousands of mourners.

== Family ==
He never married and was succeeded in the earldom by his younger brother William.

== Bibliography ==
- Kidd, Charles, Williamson, David (editors). Debrett's Peerage and Baronetage New York: St Martin's Press, 1990
- Charles Mosley (ed.), Burke's Peerage and Baronetage 3 volumes, 107th edition (London 2003)
- C Kidd and D Williamson (eds), Debrett's Peerage and Baronetage (London 2000)

Parliament of the United Kingdom
Preceded by Lord George Thynne; Lord Guernsey	Member of Parliament for Weobley; Jan – Oct 1812; With: Lord George Thynne	Succeeded by Viscount St Asaph; William Bathurst
Preceded by Michael Hicks-Beach; Joseph Cripps	Member of Parliament for Cirencester; 1812 – 1834; With: Michael Hicks-Beach 1812–1818; Joseph Cripps 1818–1834	Succeeded by Joseph Cripps; Lord Edward Somerset
Peerage of Great Britain
Preceded by Henry Bathurst	Earl Bathurst; 1834–1866	Succeeded by William Lennox Bathurst
