= HMS Veteran (1787) =

Ship of the line of the Royal Navy

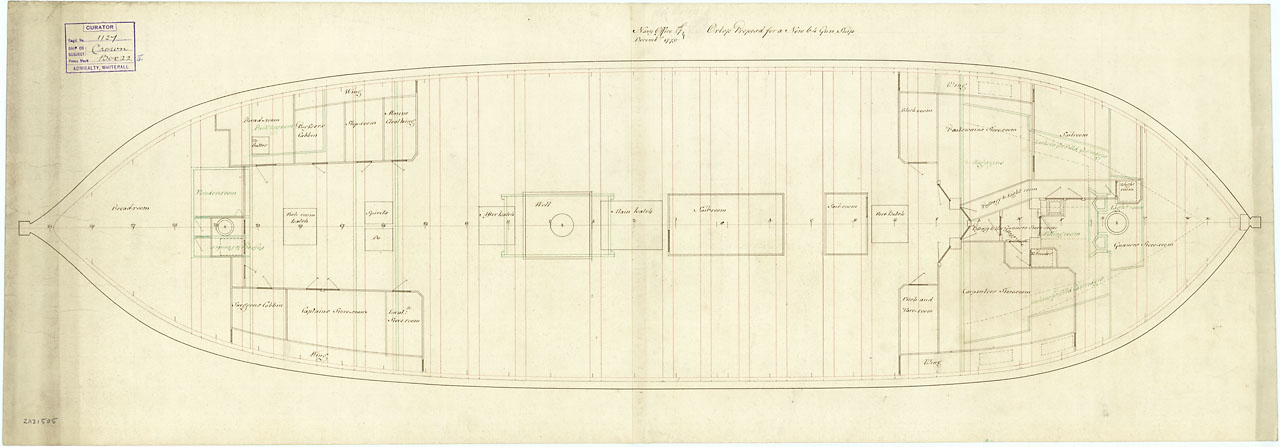
- Plan of the orlop deck of Veteran

History

Great Britain
- Name: HMS Veteran
- Ordered: 3 August 1780
- Builder: Fabian, East Cowes
- Laid down: July 1781
- Launched: 14 August 1787
- Fate: Broken up, 1816
- Notes: Participated in: Battle of Copenhagen

General characteristics
- Class & type: 64-gun third-rate ship of the line
- Tons burthen: 1,397 (bm)
- Length: 160 ft 6 in (48.9 m) (gundeck)
- Beam: 44 ft 6 in (13.6 m)
- Depth of hold: 19 ft 5 in (5.9 m)
- Propulsion: Sails
- Sail plan: Full-rigged ship
- Armament: Gundeck: 26 × 24-pounder guns; Upper gundeck: 26 × 18-pounder guns; QD: 10 × 4-pounder guns; Fc: 2 × 9-pounder guns

HMS Veteran was a 64-gun third-rate ship of the line of the Royal Navy, launched on 14 August 1787 at East Cowes. She was designed by Sir Edward Hunt, and was the only ship built to her draught.

At end-February 1798 Veteran and HMS Astraea towed General Eliott in to Great Yarmouth, Norfolk, after her crew had abandoned her.

In 1801, Veteran was present at the Battle of Copenhagen, as part of Admiral Sir Hyde Parker's reserve fleet.

In 1805, Veteran was captained by Capt. Andrew Fitzherbert Evans. She subsequently served as the flagship of Vice-Admiral Jas. Rich. Dacres, then second in command on the Jamaica Station.

Veteran was broken up in 1816.
