= Valleyfield, Fife =

Coordinates: 56.059282°N 3.6055588°W

Valleyfield
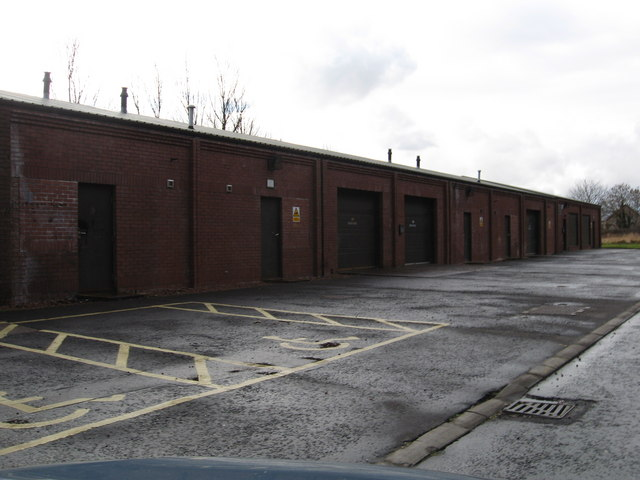
- Industrial lock-up units at Low Valleyfield

- Location within Fife
- Population: 2,280 (2020)
- Council area: Fife
- Country: Scotland
- Sovereign state: United Kingdom
- Post town: DUNFERMLINE
- Postcode district: KY12
- Police: Scotland
- Fire: Scottish
- Ambulance: Scottish

Valleyfield consists of High Valleyfield and Low Valleyfield which are neighbouring villages in Fife, Scotland, midway between Dunfermline and Kincardine-on-Forth. Low Valleyfield is on the shore of the Firth of Forth, High Valleyfield on the ridge immediately to the north.

The population of High Valleyfield was 2,940 in the 2001 Census; separate figures for the smaller settlement of Low Valleyfield were not published.

In 1801, merchant and politician Sir Robert 'Floating Bob' Preston, 6th Baronet, commissioned the English landscape architect, Sir Humphry Repton, to design a parkland setting for his classical mansion, Valleyfield House. Botanist David Douglas worked there as an apprentice gardener for a time. The Baronetcy of Valleyfield became dormant in 1873, following the death of the 9th Baron. By 1918, the estate had been abandoned by its owners, the East of Fife Coal Company, who had opened the Valleyfield Colliery in 1912. Valleyfield House was demolished in 1941.

Preston Island by Low Valleyfield, now a peninsula as the result of the landfill of ash from nearby Longannet power station, was the site of coal mining and major salt works from the 17th century onwards.

High Valleyfield was a mining village linked to the nearby Valleyfield Colliery which opened in 1908 and closed in 1978. The workings at Valleyfield connected to those at Longannet coal mine to the west, and under the Firth of Forth to those at Bo'ness on the south bank opposite. On 28 October 1939, an explosion at the mine killed 35 men.

== Notable people from Valleyfield ==
- Hugh Kelly - played over 400 league games for Blackpool between 1946 and 1960, including two FA Cup Finals.
- Bert Paton - footballer
- David Sinclair - footballer, played for Raith Rovers FC and Millwall
- George Connelly (born March 1, 1949) Footballer, position- Midfielder Celtic FC - 1968 - 1976 Falkirk FC 1976/77

== Footnotes ==
Said to be the inspiration for the Skids " Into the Valley " punk song
