= Preston Island =

Artificial island in Fife, Scotland

Location
- Location within Scotland
- OS grid reference: NT004856
- Coordinates: 56.053°N 3.600°W

Name
- Name meaning: named after Sir Robert Preston

Physical geography
- Island group: Islands of the Forth
- Highest elevation: <10 m

Administration
- Council area: Fife
- Country: Scotland
- Sovereign state: United Kingdom

Demographics
- Population: 0

Preston Island is a former artificial island in the Firth of Forth, Scotland. The reclaimed land was once used for salt production, using local coal. It is part of Fife.

== History ==
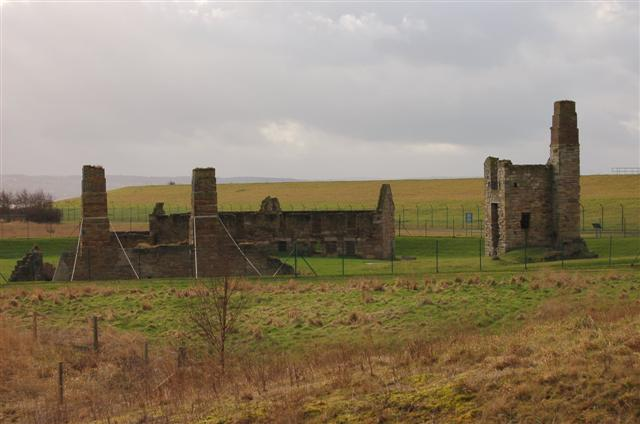
Abandoned buildings on Preston Island

Preston Island, south of Low Valleyfield in the Firth of Forth, was reclaimed by Sir Robert Preston, 6th Baronet in the early 19th century. A sea wall was constructed, followed by buildings and a coal mine, producing coal for the production of salt in saltpans on the island.

Two further coal shafts were in development when a fatal firedamp explosion occurred in 1811, after which the mine was closed.

Salt production continued for some decades, under lease from Preston. The buildings later housed an illicit distillery. Several well-maintained ruins remain.

The 'island' is no longer surrounded by water, following further land reclamation, using ash from the nearby Longannet power station.
