= Siege of Fort St. Jean =

1775 siege of the American Revolutionary War

- Part of the American Revolutionary War
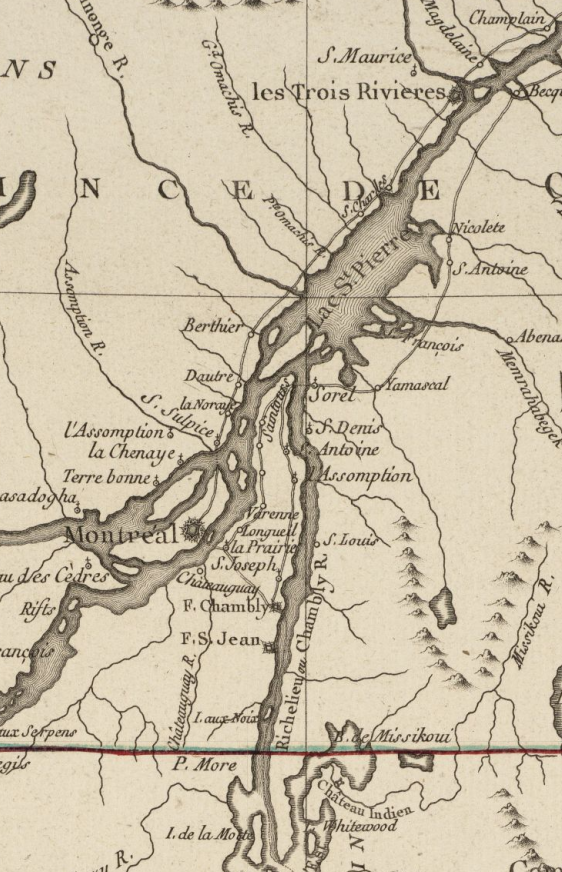
- Detail from a 1777 map of the Richelieu River valley
Date	September 17 – November 3, 1775
Location	Present-day Saint-Jean-sur-Richelieu, Quebec 45°17′56″N 73°15′06″W
Result	American victory
Territorial changes	Continental Army gains control over Quebec territory between Lake Champlain, Montreal and Quebec City

Belligerents
United Colonies	Great Britain; Haudenosaunee

Commanders and leaders
Richard Montgomery; David Wooster; James Livingston	Guy Carleton; Charles Preston; Joseph Stopford

Strength
1,500–over 2,000 (Fort St. Jean); 350 (Fort Chambly)	about 750(Fort St. Jean); 82 (Fort Chambly)

Casualties and losses
20–100 killed and wounded at least 900 sick	20 dead 23 wounded about 700 captured

The siege of Fort St. Jean (September 17 – November 3, 1775 French: Siège du Fort Saint-Jean) was conducted by American Brigadier General Richard Montgomery on the town and fort of Saint-Jean, also called St. John, St. Johns, or St. John's, in the British province of Quebec during the American Revolutionary War. The siege lasted from September 17 to November 3, 1775.

After several false starts in early September, the Continental Army established a siege around Fort St. Jean. Beset by illness, bad weather, and logistical problems, they established mortar batteries that were able to penetrate into the interior of the fort, but the defenders, who were well-supplied with munitions, but not food and other supplies, persisted in their defence, believing the siege would be broken by forces from Montreal under General Guy Carleton. On October 18, the nearby Fort Chambly fell, and on October 30, an attempt at relief by Carleton was thwarted. When word of this made its way to St. Jean's defenders, combined with a new battery opening fire on the fort, the fort's defenders capitulated, surrendering on November 3.

The fall of Fort St. Jean opened the way for the American army to march on Montreal, which fell without battle on November 13. General Carleton escaped from Montreal, and made his way to Quebec City to prepare its defences against an anticipated attack.

== Background ==
Fort Saint-Jean guarded the entry to the province of Quebec on the Richelieu River at the northern end of Lake Champlain. When Benedict Arnold and Ethan Allen captured Fort Ticonderoga and raided Fort St. Jean in May 1775, Quebec was garrisoned by about 600 regular troops, some of which were widely distributed throughout Quebec's large territory.

=== Continental Army preparations ===
The invasion of Quebec began when about 1500 men, then under the command of General Philip Schuyler, arrived at the undefended Île-aux-Noix in the Richelieu River on September 4, 1775. On September 6, the Americans began making forays toward Fort St. Jean, only 10 mi (16 km) away. The army was initially composed of militia forces from New York and Connecticut, with most of its operation directed by Brigadier General Richard Montgomery, who took over complete command from Schuyler on September 16, when Schuyler became too ill to continue leading the invasion.

=== British defensive preparations ===
Fort St. Jean had been under preparations for an attack from the south ever since Arnold's raid on Fort St. Jean on May 18, in which he captured its small garrison and Lake Champlain's only large military ship. When news of that raid reached Montreal, 140 men under the command of Major Charles Preston were immediately dispatched to hold the fort. Another 50 Canadian militia were raised in Montreal on May 19, and were also sent to the fort.

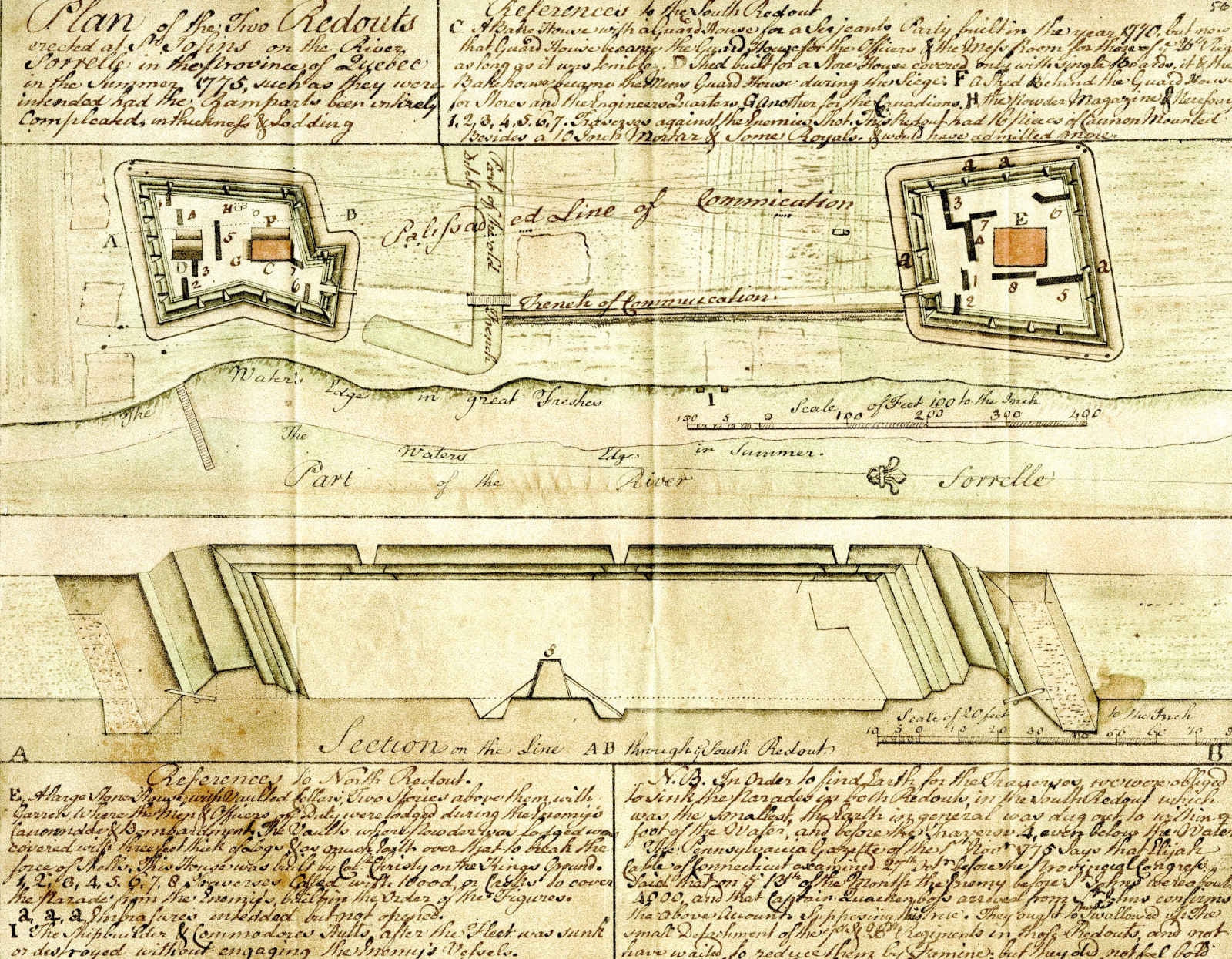
Map of the redoubts erected at Saint-Jean in the summer of 1775. Library and Archives Canada, NMC-2771

When Moses Hazen, the messenger bearing news of Arnold's raid, reached Quebec City and notified British Governor and General Guy Carleton of the raid, Carleton immediately dispatched additional troops from there and Trois-Rivières to St. Jean. Carleton himself went to Montreal on May 26 to oversee arrangements for the defense of the province, which he decided to concentrate on St. Jean, as it was the most likely invasion route.

By the time the Americans arrived at Île-aux-Noix, Fort St. Jean was defended by about 750 men under the command of Major Charles Preston. Most were regular troops from the 7th and 26th Regiments of Foot and the Royal Artillery. There were 90 locally raised militia, and 20 members of Colonel Allen Maclean's Royal Highland Emigrants, veterans of the French and Indian War. A detachment of Indians (probably Caughnawaga from a nearby village) patrolled outside the fort under the direction of Claude de Lorimier and Gilbert Tice. The Richelieu River was patrolled by an armed schooner, Royal Savage, under the command of Lieutenant William Hunter, with other boats under construction.

The fort, sited on the west bank of the Richelieu River, consisted of two earthen redoubts about 600 ft (180 m) apart, surrounded by a ditch 7 ft (2.1 m) wide and 8 ft (2.4 m) deep lined with chevaux de frise. The southern redoubt was roughly 250 by 200 feet (80 by 65 metres), and contained 6 buildings, including a bake house, the fort's magazine, and storage houses. The northern redoubt was slightly larger, enclosing a two-storey stone house used as a barracks. The defenders had cleared brush for several hundred yards around the fort to ensure a clear field of fire. They had erected a wooden palisade west of the redoubts and dug a trench connecting the two redoubts for ease of communications. The eastern side of the fort faced the river, where there was a shipyard and anchorage for Royal Savage.

== First approach ==
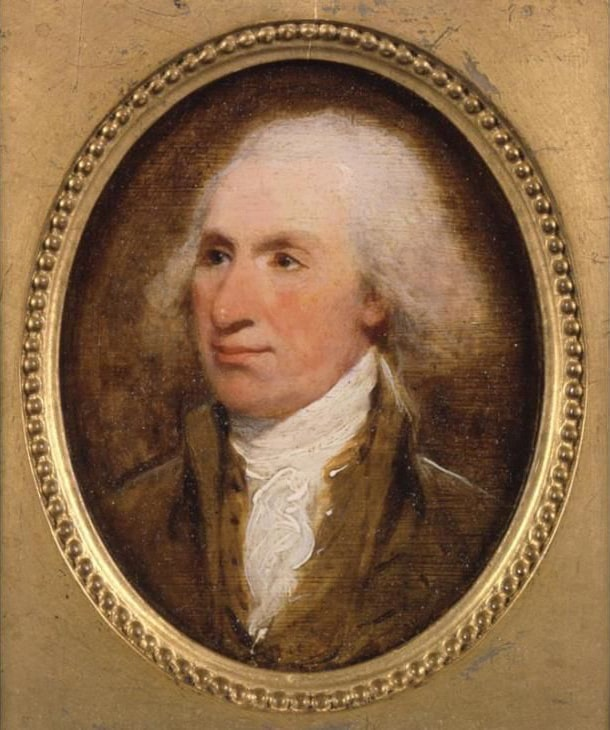
General Philip Schuyler

=== Skirmish with Indians ===
On September 6, Generals Schuyler and Montgomery led a force of men in bateaux to a landing point about 1 mi (1.6 km) upriver from Fort St. Jean. Schuyler remained with the boats while Montgomery led some men into the swampy lands above the fort. There they were surprised by about 100 Indians led by Tice and Lorimier. In the ensuing skirmish, the Americans suffered 8 dead and 9 wounded, while the Indians suffered 4 dead and 5 wounded, with Tice among the wounded. The American troops, which were relatively untried militia forces, retreated to the boats, where they erected a breastwork for protection. The fort's defenders, seeing this, fired their cannon at the breastwork, prompting the Americans to retreat about 1 mi (1.6 km) upriver, where they set up a second breastwork and camped for the night. The Indians, resentful that neither the British forces in the fort nor the habitants had come to their aid in the engagement, returned to their homes.

At this camp, Schuyler was visited by a local man, believed by some historians to be Moses Hazen. Hazen, a Massachusetts-born retired officer who lived near the fort, painted a bleak portrait of the American situation. He said that the fort was defended by the entire 26th regiment and 100 Indians, that it was well-stocked and ready for a siege. He also said that the habitants, while friendly to the American cause, were unlikely to help the Americans unless the prospects for victory looked good. Schuyler held a war council on September 7, in which the command decided to retreat back to Île-aux-Noix. However, on September 8, reinforcements arrived: another 800 men including Connecticut militia under David Wooster and New Yorkers with artillery, joined them. Heartened by this arrival, they decided instead to proceed with a nighttime attempt on the fort. Schuyler, whose illness was getting more severe (he was so ill "as not to be able to hold the pen"), turned command of the army over to Montgomery.

Reports of this first contact between opposing forces outside St. Jean were often wildly exaggerated, with many local reports claiming it as some kind of victory. The Quebec Gazette, for example, reported that 60 Indians had driven off 1,500 Americans, killing 30 and wounding 40. Following this news, General Carleton issued orders for all of the nearby parishes to call up ten percent of their militia. Officers of the militia reported to Montreal, but many militia men stayed home. By September 7, a troop of about 120 men was raised, which was sent to Fort St. Jean.

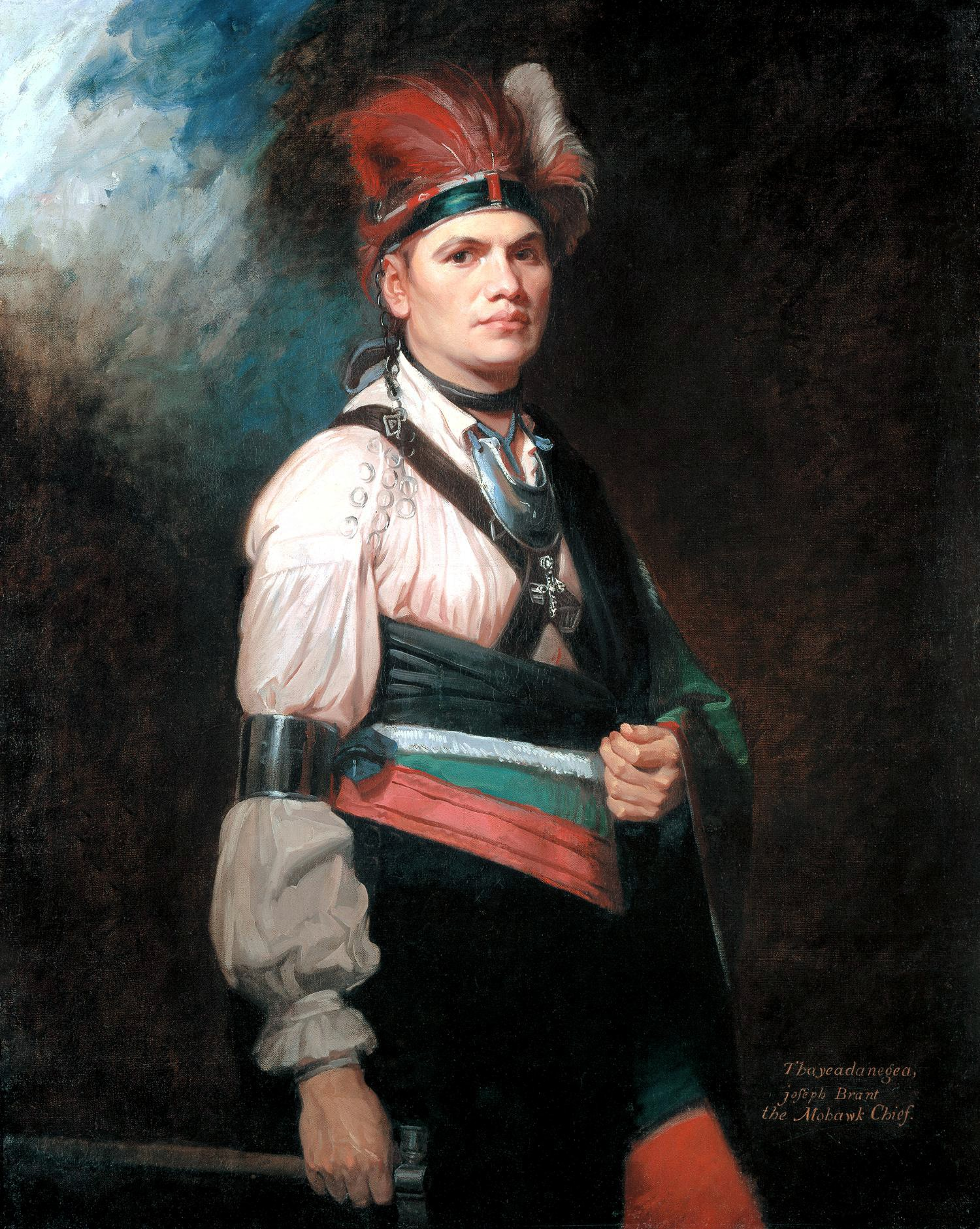
Joseph Brant

=== Propaganda and recruiting ===
On September 8, Schuyler sent Ethan Allen (acting as a volunteer since he had been deposed as head of the Green Mountain Boys by Seth Warner) and John Brown to circulate a proclamation announcing the Americans' arrival, and their desire to free the Canadians from the bondage of British rule. Allen and Brown traveled through the parishes between St. Jean and Montreal, where they were well-received, and even provided with local guards. James Livingston, a local grain merchant (and a relative of Montgomery's wife), began raising a local militia near Chambly, eventually gathering nearly 300 men.

Allen also visited the village of the Caughnawaga, from whom he received assurances of their neutrality. The Caughnawaga had been the subject of a propaganda war, with Guy Johnson, the British Indian agent, trying to convince them (as well as other tribes of the Haudenosaunee Confederacy) to take up arms against the Americans. However, Schuyler had successfully negotiated an agreement in August with most of the Haudenosaunee to remain neutral. Word of this agreement reached the Caughnawaga on September 10; when Carleton and Johnson learned of it, Johnson sent Daniel Claus and Joseph Brant in an attempt to change the minds of the Caughnawaga; their entreaties were refused.

== Second approach ==
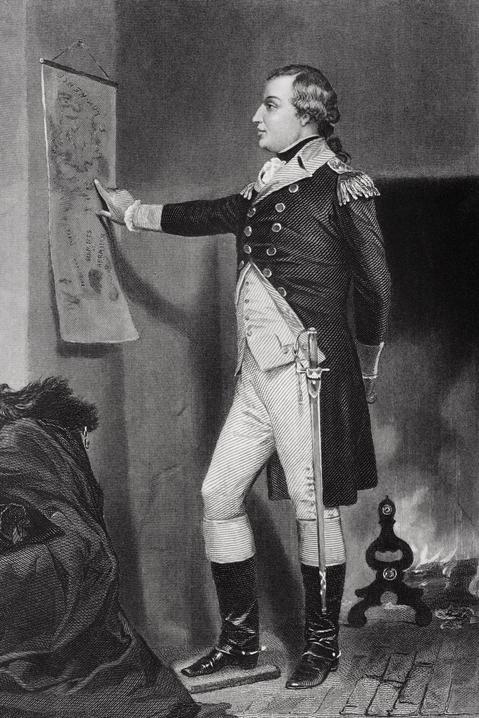
Portrait of Montgomery by Alonzo Chappel

On the night of September 10, Montgomery led 1000 men out again, returning to the first landing site by boat. In the confusion of the darkness and the swamp, some of the troops were separated from the rest. When they encountered one another again, panic ensued as both groups mistook the other for the enemy. After just 30 minutes in the swamp, they returned to the landing. Montgomery, who had stayed with the boats, sent the troops out again. This time, the vanguard encountered a few Indians and habitants, and again panicked. Two of the "enemy" were killed, but the troops again made a disorderly retreat to the landing, which their commander, Colonel Rudolphus Ritzema, was apparently unable to stop.

While the command staff met to discuss the next move, word came that the British warship Royal Savage was approaching. This started a disorganized retreat upriver back to Île-aux-Noix, during which the command staff was nearly left behind.

A third attempt was planned for September 13; bad weather delayed attempts until September 16. However, General Schuyler was by that time so ill he thought a withdrawal to Ticonderoga necessary. Leaving that day, he turned full command of the invasion over to Montgomery. Bad weather and the swampy, malaria-infested terrain of Île-aux-Noix wore down the troops, who also increasingly took ill. The bad news was tempered by good: an additional 250 troops, in the form of a company of Green Mountain Boys under Seth Warner, and another company of New Hampshire men under Colonel Timothy Bedel, arrived at Île-aux-Noix.

== Siege begins ==
On September 17, Montgomery's army disembarked from their makeshift fleet just south of St. Jean, and sent out John Brown with a detachment to block the road going north from the fort to Montreal. A small flotilla of armed boats guarded the river against the possibility of Royal Savage attacking the army as it landed.

Brown and his men made their first interdiction that day, capturing a wagon-train of supplies destined for the fort. Seeing this, Preston sent a sortie to recover the goods. Brown's men, who had had time to hide the supplies in the woods, retreated until the sounds of the conflict reached the main body of the army. Montgomery, along with Bedel and his company, rushed to Brown's aid, and succeeded in driving the British back into the fort without recovering the supplies. During this encounter, Moses Hazen was first captured and questioned by Brown, then arrested again by the British and brought into the fort. That night, Hazen and Lorimier, the Indian agent, sneaked out of the fort and went to Montreal to report the situation to Carleton.

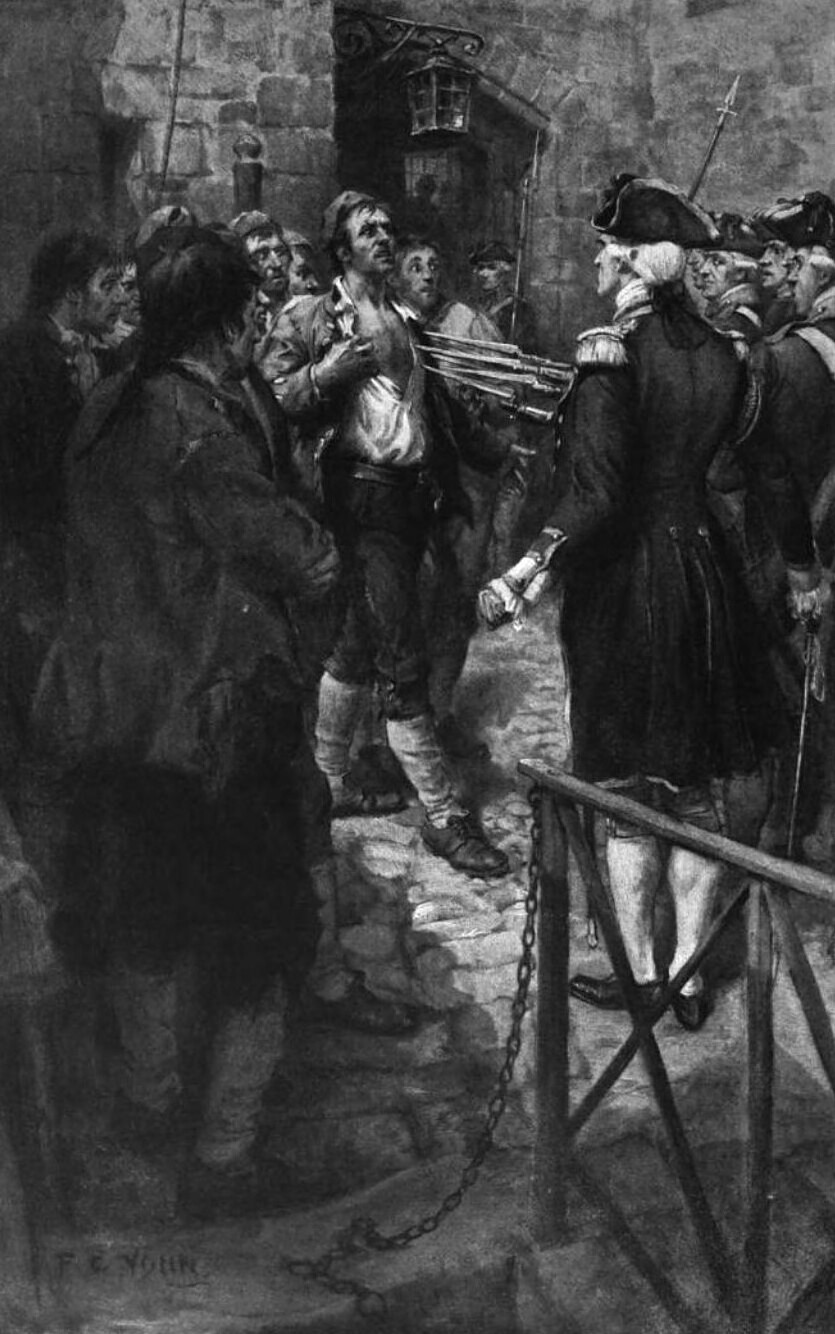
Ethan Allen and his captors in Montreal

Montgomery began entrenching his troops around the fort on September 18, constructing a mortar battery to its south. He ordered Brown to establish a position at La Prairie, one of the sites with a crossing of the Saint Lawrence River to Montreal. Ethan Allen went with a small company of Americans to collect Canadiens that Livingston had been recruiting, and take them to monitor Longueuil, the other major crossing. Livingston had established a base at Point-Olivier, below Fort Chambly, another aging fort at the base of some rapids in the Richelieu River, and urged his compatriots join him there. Some Loyalists attempted to dissuade others from joining with Livingston; Livingston's supporters sometimes violently opposed attempts by Loyalists to organize, and Carleton did nothing at the time to assist the Loyalists outside the city.

Allen, renowned for bravado in the action at Fort Ticonderoga, decided when he reached Longueuil on September 24 to capture Montreal. His efforts failed the next day at the Battle of Longue-Pointe, with Allen and some of his men captured by the British. The alarm raised by Allen's proximity to Montreal resulted in the mustering of about 1,200 men from rural districts outside Montreal. Carleton failed to capitalize on this upwelling of Loyalist support by using them for a relief expedition against the besieging Americans. After several weeks of inaction by Carleton, the rural men drifted away, called by the demands of home and harvest. (Carleton did take advantage of the moment to order the arrest of Thomas Walker, a Montreal merchant who was openly pro-American and had been reporting to the Americans.)

Conditions for Americans constructing the siege works were difficult. The ground was swampy, and trenches quickly filled knee-deep with water. Montgomery described his army as "half-drowned rats crawling through a swamp". To make matters even worse, food and ammunition were running out, and the British showed no sign of giving in despite the bombardment. Disease thinned the American ranks; by mid-October, illness had sent more than 900 back to Ticonderoga. In the early days of the siege, the defenders took advantage of land they had cleared around the fort to make life as difficult as possible for the besiegers erecting batteries. Major Preston wrote in his journal on September 23 that "a deserter [tells us where] the enemy are erecting their battery and we distress them as much as we can with shells." Until large guns arrived from Ticonderoga, the fort's defenders enjoyed a significant advantage in firepower.

== Large cannon arrive ==
On October 6, a cannon dubbed the "Old Sow" arrived from Ticonderoga. Put in position the next day, it started lobbing shells at the fort. Montgomery then began planning the placement of a second battery. Initially favouring northwest of the fort, his staff convinced him to install the battery on the eastern shore of the Richelieu, where it would command the shipyard and Royal Savage. This battery, its construction complicated by an armed row galley sent from the fort to oppose the works, was completed on October 13, opening fire the next day. The day after that, Royal Savage lay in ruins before the fort. Its commander had, in anticipation of her destruction, ordered her to be anchored where her supplies and armaments might be recovered.

== Fort Chambly taken ==
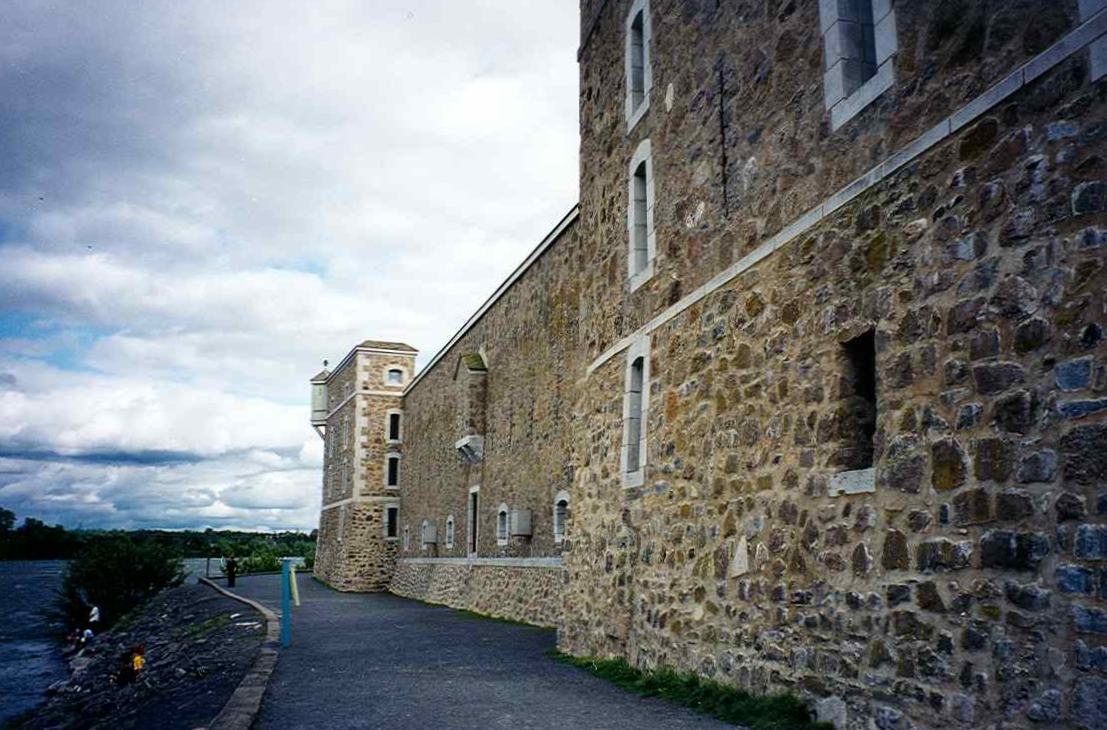
The walls of Fort Chambly

James Livingston had advanced to Montgomery the idea of taking Fort Chambly, near where his militia was encamped. One of Livingston's captains, Jeremy Duggan, had on September 13 floated two nine-pound guns past St. Jean, and these guns were put to use to that end. Chambly, garrisoned by only 82 men (mostly from the 7th Foot) was surrendered on October 18 by its commander, Major Joseph Stopford, after two days' bombardment. Most seriously, Stopford failed to destroy supplies vitally useful to the Americans — primarily gunpowder, but also winter provisions. Six tons of powder, 6,500 musket cartridges, 125 muskets, 80 barrels of flour and 272 barrels of foodstuff were captured.

Timothy Bedel negotiated a cease-fire with Major Preston so that the prisoners captured at Chambly could be floated upriver past St. Jean. The loss of Chambly had a dispiriting effect at St. Jean; some of the militia wanted to surrender, but Preston would not allow it. Following Chambly's capitulation, Montgomery renewed his intention to construct a battery northwest of St. Jean. This time, his staff raised no objections, and by the end of October guns emplaced there opened fire on the fort.

== Carleton tries to help ==
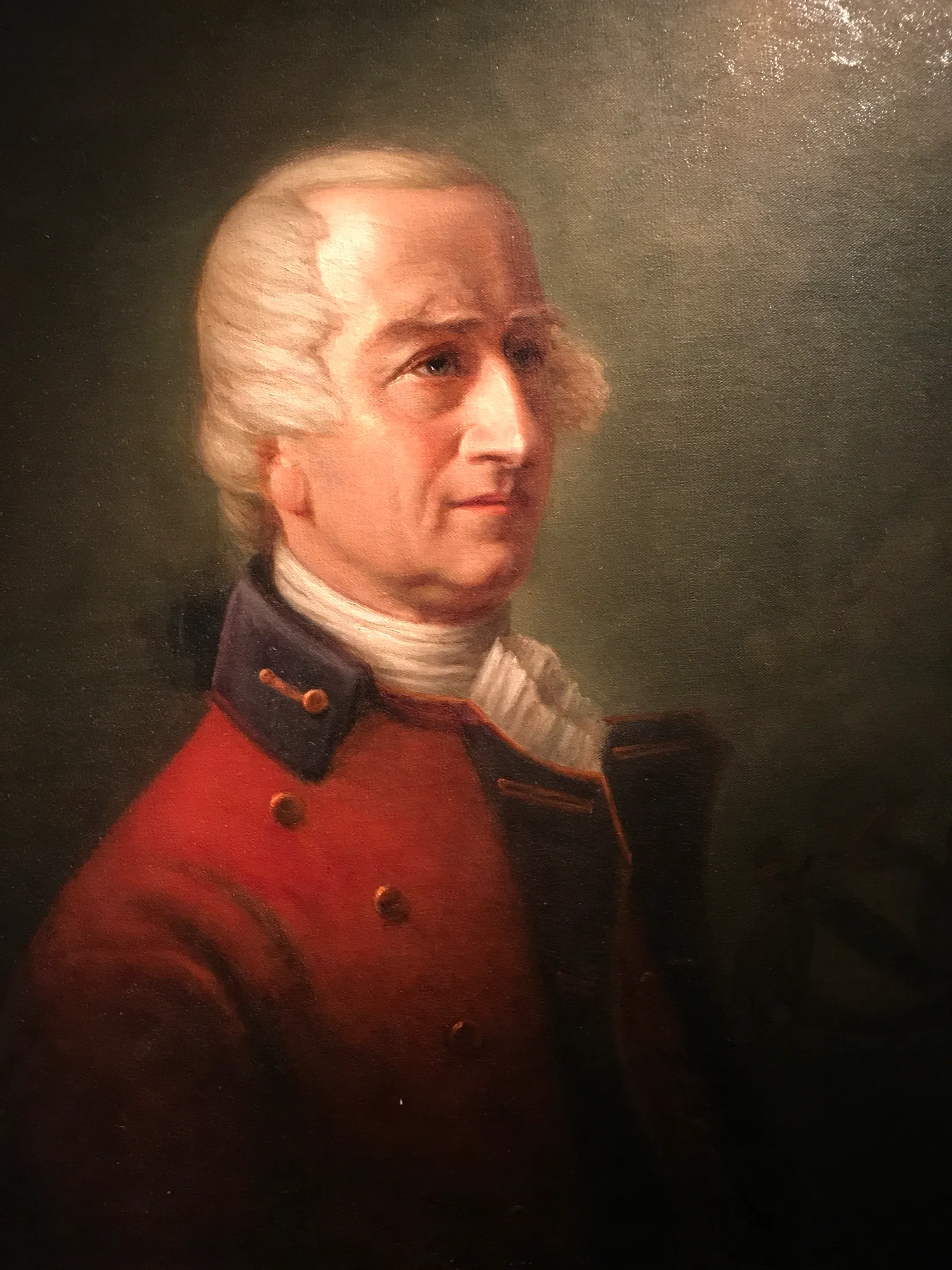
General Guy Carleton

In Montreal, Carleton was finally prodded to move. Under constant criticism for failure to act and mistrustful of his militia forces, he developed a plan of attack. He sent word to Colonel Allan Maclean at Quebec to bring more of his Royal Highland Emigrants and some militia forces to Sorel, from where they would move up the Richelieu toward St. Jean, while Carleton would lead a force across the Saint Lawrence at Longueuil.

Maclean raised a force of about 180 emigrants, and a number of militia. By the time he reached Sorel on October 14, he had raised, in addition to the emigrants, about 400 militia, sometimes using threatening tactics to gain recruits. His and Carleton's hopes were dashed on October 30, when Carleton's attempted landing at Longueuil of a force numbering about 1,000 (mostly militia, with some emigrant and Indian support) was repulsed by the Americans. A few of his boats were landed, but most were driven off by Seth Warner's field artillery which had been captured at Chambly.

Maclean attempted to press forward, but his militia began to desert while the forces of Brown and Livingston grew. He retreated to Sorel and made his way back to Quebec.

== Surrender ==
In late October, American troop strength surged again with the arrival of 500 men from New York and Connecticut, including Brigadier General David Wooster. This news, combined with the new battery trained on the fort, news of the failed relief expedition, and dwindling supplies, made the situation in the fort quite grim.

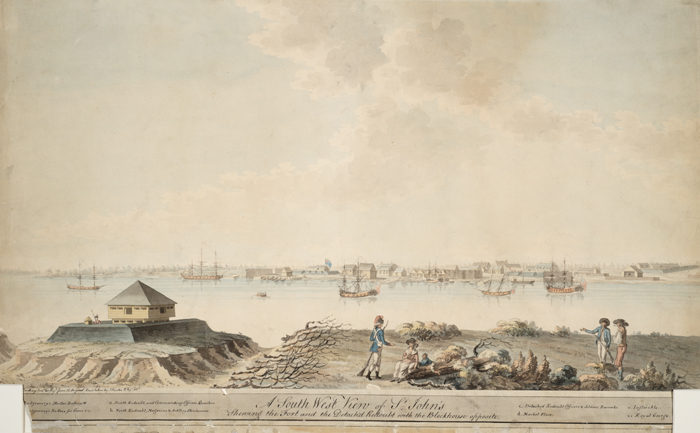
A 1790 watercolor showing Fort Saint-Jean in the background, and HMS Royal Savage in the foreground

On November 1, Montgomery sent a truce flag, carried by a prisoner captured during Carleton's aborted relief attempt, into the fort. The man delivered a letter in which Montgomery, pointing out that relief was unlikely to arrive, offered to negotiate a surrender. Preston, not entirely trusting the man's report, sent one of his captains to confer with Montgomery. The counteroffer, which Montgomery rejected due to the lateness of the season, was a four-day truce, after which the garrison would surrender if no relief came. Montgomery let the captain examine a second prisoner from Carleton's expedition, who confirmed the report of the first. Montgomery repeated his demand for an immediate surrender, terms for which were drawn up the next day.

Preston's troops marched out of the fort and surrendered their weapons on November 3, with the regulars in full dress uniform. He surrendered 536 officers and soldiers, 79 Canadien and eight English volunteers. The Americans were able to raise Royal Savage and return her to service.

== Aftermath ==
Following the news of St. Jean's surrender, Carleton immediately prepared to leave Montreal. He left on November 11, two days before American troops entered the city without opposition. Narrowly escaping capture when his fleet was forced to surrender after being threatened by batteries at Sorel, he made his way to Quebec to prepare that city's defenses.

Casualties on both sides during the siege were relatively light, but the Continental Army suffered a significant reduction in force due to illness. Furthermore, the long siege meant that the Continental Army had to move on Quebec City with winter setting in, and with many enlistments nearing expiration at year's end. Richard Montgomery was promoted to Major General on December 9, 1775, for his capture of Saint Jean and Montreal. He would never learn of his promotion: the news did not reach the American camp outside Quebec before his death on December 31 during the Battle of Quebec.

In 1776, the British reoccupied the fort following the Continental Army's abandonment of it during its retreat to Fort Ticonderoga.

== Legacy ==
The British (and then Canadian) military occupied the Fort Saint-Jean site until 1995, using it since 1952 as the campus of the Royal Military College, which still occupies part of the site. The site now includes a museum devoted to the 350-year military history of Fort Saint-Jean.

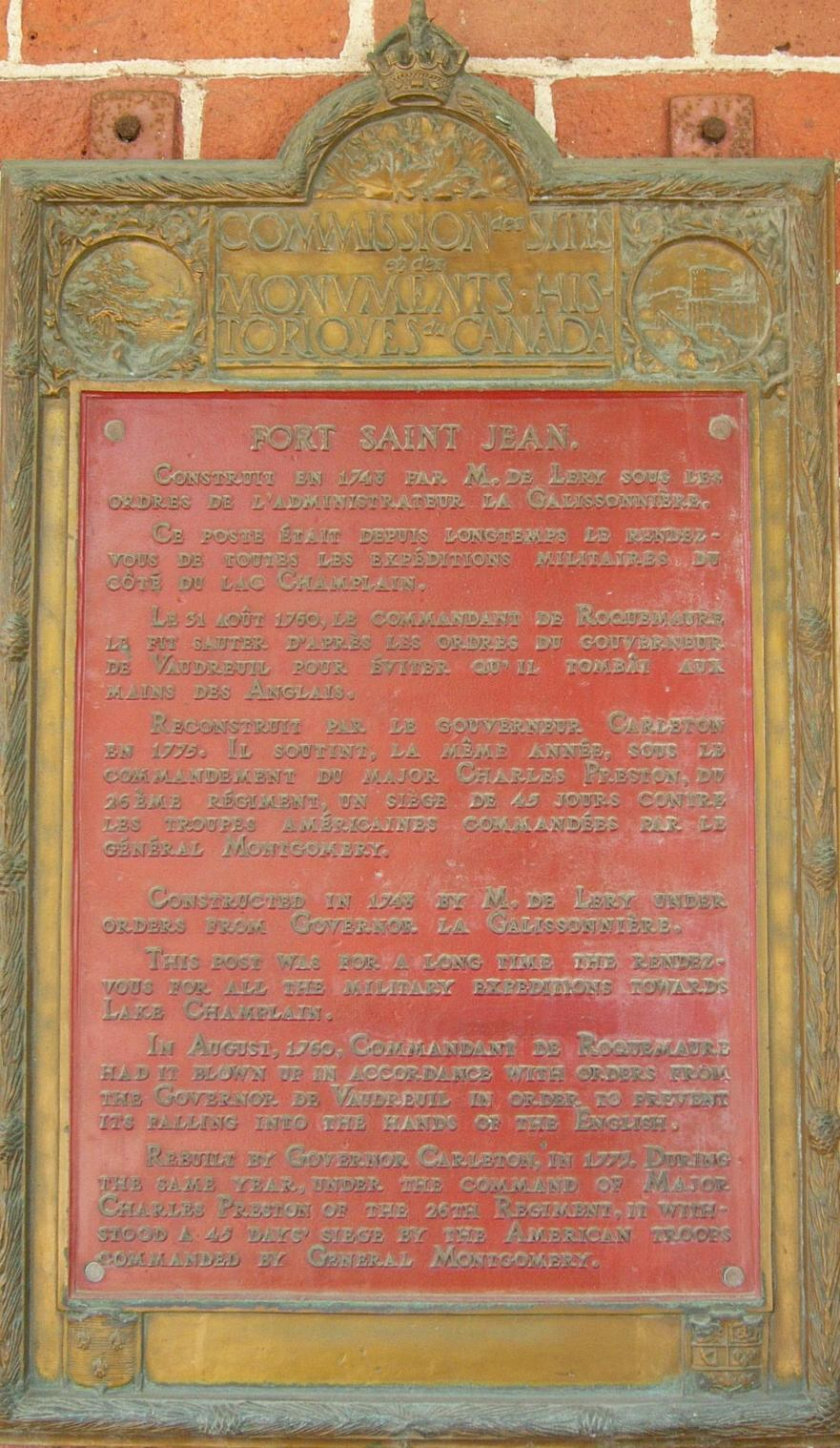
Historic plaque Fort-Saint-Jean 1926

The siege is mentioned in a Fort Saint-Jean plaque erected in 1926 by the Historic Sites and Monuments Board of Canada at the Royal Military College Saint-Jean. It reads, "Constructed in 1743 by M. de Léry under orders from Governor la Galissonnière. This post was for all the military expeditions towards Lake Champlain. In August 31, 1760, Commandant de Roquemaure had it blown up in accordance with orders from the Governor de Vaudreuil in order to prevent its falling into the hands of the English. Rebuilt by Governor Carleton, in 1773. During the same year, under the command of Major Charles Preston of the 26th Regiment, it succumbed to a 45 day siege by the American troops commanded by General Montgomery."
