= William Bathurst, 5th Earl Bathurst =

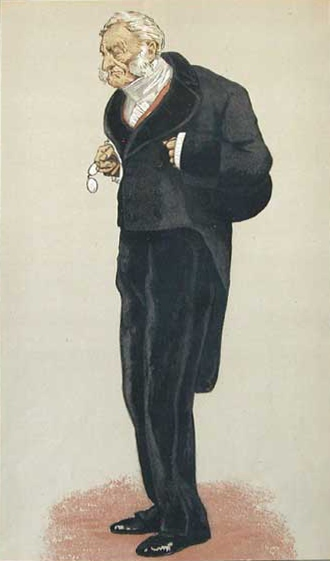
"A Relic" Earl Bathurst as caricatured by James Tissot in Vanity Fair, November 1873

William Lennox Bathurst, 5th Earl Bathurst (14 February 1791 – 24 February 1878), styled The Honourable William Bathurst from 1794 to 1866, was a British peer, Tory Member of Parliament and civil servant.

Bathurst was the second son of Henry Bathurst, 3rd Earl Bathurst, and his wife Lady Georgina (née Lennox). He was educated at Christ Church, Oxford, where he graduated with a Master of Arts in 1812. The same year, aged twenty-one, he was elected to the House of Commons as one of two representatives for Weobley (succeeding his elder brother Lord Apsley), a seat he held until 1816. He then returned to Christ Church and graduated with a Bachelor of Arts in 1817. In 1821 he was called to the Bar, Lincoln's Inn. Bathurst was a Deputy Teller of the Exchequer between 1816 and 1830 and a Commissioner for victualling the Royal Navy between 1825 and 1829 and served as Joint Secretary to the Board of Trade from 1830 to 1847 and as Joint Clerk of the Privy Council from 1830 to 1860. In 1866, aged seventy-five, he succeeded his elder brother in the earldom and entered the House of Lords.

Lord Bathurst died in February 1878, aged eighty-seven. He never married and was succeeded in his titles by his nephew Allen.

== Notes ==
Parliament of the United Kingdom
| Preceded by Lord George Thynne; Lord Apsley | Member of Parliament for Weobley; 1812–1816; With: Viscount St Asaph 1812–1813; James Lenox William Naper 1813–1816 | Succeeded by James Lenox William Naper; Lord Frederick Cavendish-Bentinck |
Government offices
| Preceded by James Buller; Charles Greville | Clerk of the Privy Council; 1830–1860; With: Charles Greville 1830–1859 | Succeeded by Arthur Helps |
Peerage of Great Britain
| Preceded by Henry George Bathurst | Earl Bathurst; 1866–1878 | Succeeded by Allen Alexander Bathurst |
