= George Ashburnham =

George Ashburnham may refer to:

- George Ashburnham, 3rd Earl of Ashburnham (1760–1830), British peer
- George Ashburnham, Viscount St Asaph (1785–1813), British politician
