= Longannet power station =

Former coal-fired power station in Scotland

Longannet Power Station
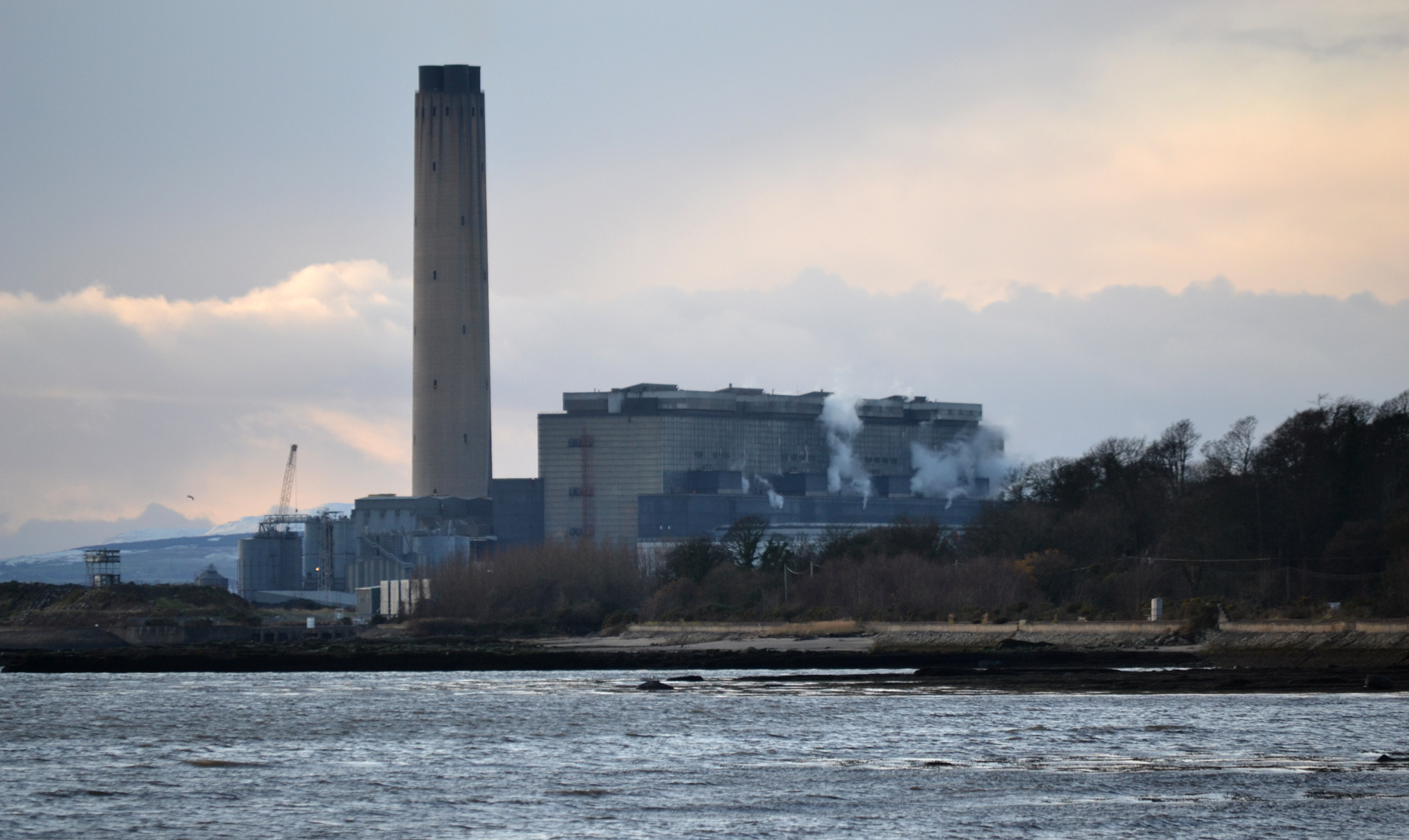
- Longannet power station in 2011
- Country: Scotland
- Location: Fife
- Coordinates: 56.0489°N 3.6823°W
- Status: Demolished
- Construction began: 1964; 62 years ago
- Commission date: 1970–1973; 53 years ago
- Decommission date: 24 March 2016; 10 years ago
- Operators: South of Scotland Electricity Board (1970–1991); Scottish Power (1991–2016)

Thermal power station
- Primary fuel: Coal
- Secondary fuel: Gas

Power generation
- Nameplate capacity: 2,400 MW
- Annual net output: 9,525 GWh (2012)

External links
- Commons: Related media on Commons

Longannet power station was a large coal-fired power station in Fife, and the last coal-fired power station in Scotland. It was capable of co-firing biomass, natural gas and sludge. The station stood on the north bank of the Firth of Forth, near Kincardine on Forth.

Its generating capacity of 2,400 megawatts was the highest of any power station in Scotland. The station began generating electricity in 1970, and when it became fully operational it was the largest coal-fired station in Europe. At the time of closure it was the third largest, after Bełchatów in Poland and Drax in England, and the 21st most polluting.

Longannet was operated by the South of Scotland Electricity Board until 1990, when its operation was handed over to Scottish Power following privatisation. After failing to win a contract from National Grid, the station closed on 24 March 2016.

The station was a regional landmark, dominating the Forth skyline with its 183 m (600 ft) chimney stack. Longannet lacked cooling towers, having instead used water from the River Forth for cooling. On 4 February 2021, the boiler house, turbine hall and control room were demolished in a controlled explosion. On 9 December 2021, the chimney stack was demolished.

== History ==
The station was designed by Scottish architects Robert Matthew, Johnson Marshall & Partners. Consulting Engineers were Merz and McLellan. Construction began in 1964, 4 km (2.5 mi) downstream of the existing Kincardine power station. The station was constructed on 30 hectares (74 acres) of land reclaimed from the Firth of Forth using ash from the Kincardine station. It began generating electricity in 1970, with a design lifetime of 30 years, and was in full operation by 1973. At the time of its completion, the station was the largest in Europe.

The facility was operated by the South of Scotland Electricity Board until 1990 when the electricity industry in the UK was privatised. After that it was operated by Scottish Power, a subsidiary of Iberdrola. It paid £40M per year in connection charges to National Grid due to its distance from South England.

The plant opted in to the UK Transitional National Plan, placing limits on its sulphur dioxide, nitrous oxides and particulates emissions. The plant tested additional technologies that could have permitted it to operate beyond 2020 under the EU Industrial Emissions Directive. The station closed on 24 March 2016.

=== Demolition ===
Demolition at the site commenced in November 2018 with the 'blow down' of the coal stock towers. The eastern boiler annexe was demolished on 11 April 2019. The boiler house, turbine hall and control room were all demolished on 4 February 2021.

On 9 December 2021, the chimney stack was demolished. Three days before this, Scottish Power had illuminated a slogan onto the chimney that read "Make Coal History". The explosives were triggered by the First Minister of Scotland, Nicola Sturgeon.

== Design and specification ==
Longannet had an installed capacity of 2,400 MW and a declared net capacity of 2,304 MW due to plant overheads. The station produced 9,525 GWh of electricity in 2012, an increase on the 9,139 GWh produced in 2011.

=== Electricity generation ===
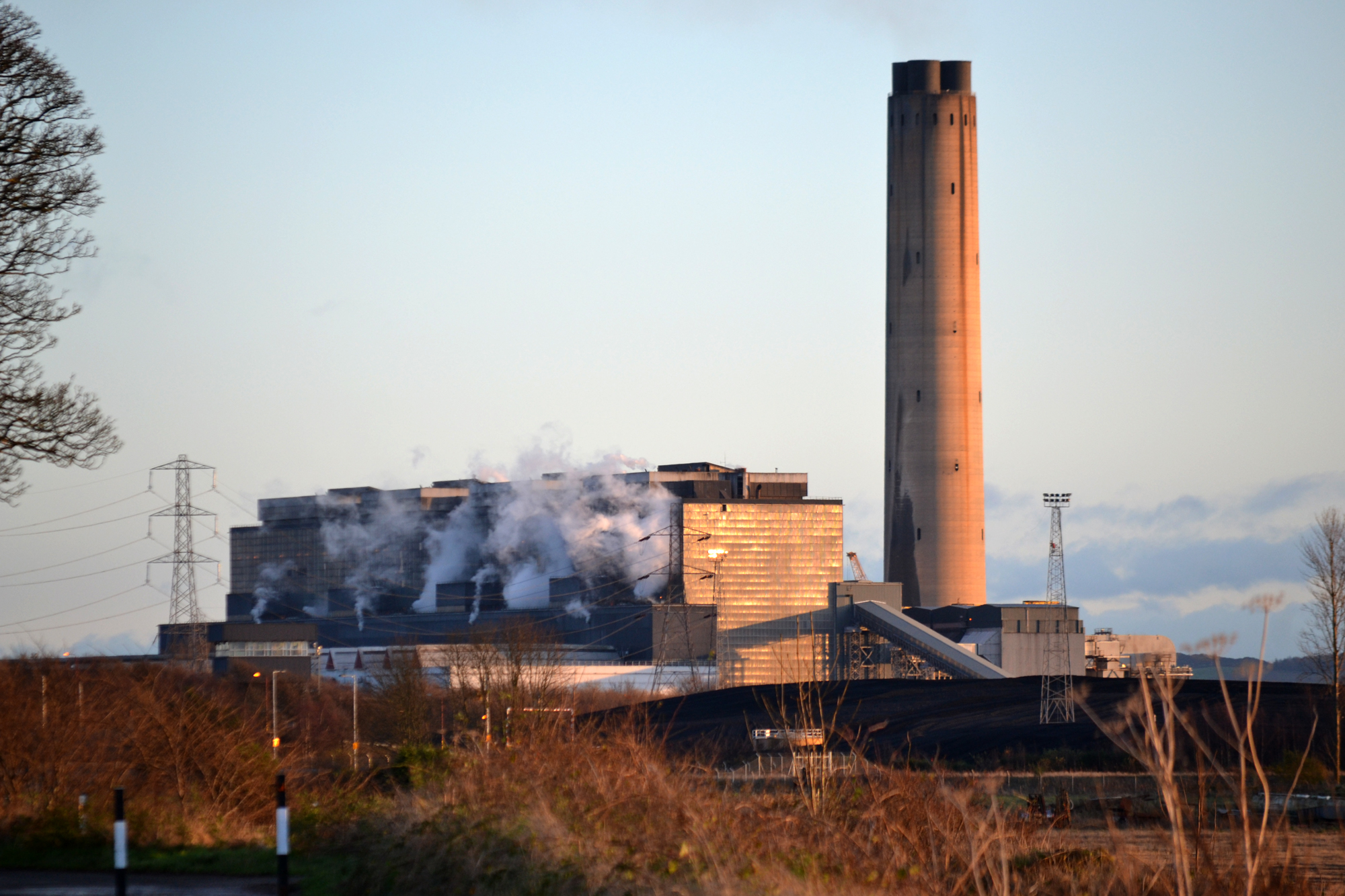
The station in December 2011

The station consumed up to 4,500,000 tonnes (4,400,000 long tons; 5,000,000 short tons) of coal each year. Coal was delivered either by road or rail to the station's coal store, which had the capacity to hold up to 2,000,000 tonnes. It was then fed from the coal store to the boiler house by a conveyor belt capable of carrying 3,500 tonnes of coal per hour.

Each of the four boilers was serviced by eight pulverising units, each capable of processing 40 tonnes of coal an hour. The front-wall-fired Foster Wheeler boilers could each burn around 250 tonnes of coal an hour at full load. There were two forced draft and two induced draft fans on each boiler. Each boiler provided around 1,800 tonnes per hour of steam at a pressure of 168 bars (16,800 kPa) and a temperature of 568 °C (1,054 °F) to two 300 MW General Electric Company turbo generators. The thermal efficiency of the plant was around 37%.

=== Coal supply ===
Coal was originally supplied directly by conveyor belt from the neighbouring Longannet Colliery, until it closed in 2002 after a flood. Around half of the coal used was Scottish, and the rest had to be imported, the majority via the former British Steel plc ore loading facility at Hunterston Terminal in Ayrshire. Onward transport was by rail and the level of traffic required to supply Longannet's fuel demand caused congestion on the Scottish rail network. An alternative route, the Stirling-Alloa-Kincardine rail link, at the mouth of the river Forth was reopened in 2008, and was also used to deliver coal.

=== Cooling system ===
The chimney was 183 metres (600 ft) tall; the station did not have cooling towers, instead using water drawn from the Firth of Forth at a rate of 327,000 cubic metres (11,500,000 cu ft) per hour for the station's cooling condensers. The water was passed through coarse screens and then circulated by four electrically driven pumps. Once circulated through the station's condensers, the water was discharged into a mile long cooling channel, where heat was dissipated before the water reached a wide part of the Forth. Water used by the boilers was on a different cycle, and had to be deionised. Losses from this supply were made up by a plant capable of treating 218 cubic metres (7,700 cu ft) of water per hour.

=== Electrostatic precipitators and sulphur trioxide conditioning ===
The station was fitted with electrostatic precipitators (ESP) to reduce the station's particulate emissions. In the late 1980s, the station's units were fitted with sulphur trioxide (SO_{3}) conditioning equipment to lower the fly ash's electrical resistivity. This was to ensure the station maintained allowable particulate emissions. Between 1989 and 1994, the station's ESPs were given a major refurbishment. This meant that the SO_{3} conditioning equipment did not need to be operated as frequently to maintain the allowed level of particulate emissions. This was beneficial as SO_{3} is hazardous.

=== NOx reduction ===
In 1994, the station was awarded funding from the European Commission under the THERMIE Demonstration Programme. With this money, Unit 2 at the station was retrofitted with gas-reburn equipment. This was the largest scale application of this technology in the world. In this process, natural gas is injected into the boiler. This cut NOx emissions from Unit 2 by 50%, as well as giving a reduction in CO_{2} and SO_{2} emissions. In 1996, all the station's boilers were fitted with Low NOx burners. This reduced the station's NOx emissions by 40%.

The blend of coal fed to each unit was intended to minimise emissions of sulphur.

=== Carbon capture and storage ===
The UK's first carbon capture and storage (CCS) unit was commissioned at the station in 2009. It closed in 2011 after it became clear that it was not financially viable. Plans for a UK Government funded project to convert Longannet to CCS were abandoned in 2011 and no further plans for CCS at Longannet were announced.

== Environmental and health impact ==
In 2003, Longannet was named as Scotland's biggest polluter in a report by the Scottish Environment Protection Agency (SEPA). The station produced up to 4,350 tonnes of ash per day. This was piped to ash lagoons surrounding the nearby Preston Island. This was then landscaped and used to claim land from the Firth of Forth.

To improve environmental emissions, Longannet was fitted with 'Low-NOx' burners to limit the formation of oxides of nitrogen and a 'gas reburn system' that used natural gas to convert NOx into nitrogen and water vapour. Longannet used to burn up to 65,000 tonnes of treated and dried sewage sludge per year, which has a similar calorific value to low-quality brown coal. In 2005, a judge ruled the burning of sludge as illegal, but the SEPA continued to allow Scottish Power to burn the sludge illegally as part of an agreement which originally required Scottish Power to construct, and have in operation, a biomass plant in 2010. All burning of biomass at Longannet – including waste-derived fuel and sawdust pellets – ceased in April 2012.

In 2007, the WWF named Europe's 30 most climate polluting power stations in absolute terms; of these, Longannet was the most polluting in the UK (relative to power output). It was the 21st most polluting power station in Europe.

According to a Greenpeace-commissioned report by Stuttgart University on the health impacts of the biggest coal-burning power plants in Europe, Longannet was responsible for 4,210 lost 'life years' in 2010.

Preceded by Ratcliffe-on-Soar Power Station	Largest power station in the UK; 1973–1986	Succeeded by Drax power station
