= General Eliott (1782 EIC ship) =

British East Indiaman 1782–1802

History

Great Britain
- Name: General Eliott
- Namesake: General Eliott
- Owner: Robert Preston
- Operator: British East India Company
- Builder: Perry, Randall, Rotherhithe
- Launched: 8 November 1782
- Fate: Sold for breaking up in 1802

General characteristics
- Tons burthen: 755, 800, (bm)
- Length: Overall:143 ft 11 in (43.9 m); Keel:116 ft 5 in (35.5 m)
- Beam: 35 ft 11 1/2 in (11.0 m)
- Depth of hold: 14 ft 11 in (4.5 m)
- Propulsion: Sail
- Complement: 1793:99; 1793:85; 1795:80
- Armament: 1793:26 × 9-pounder guns + 4 swivel guns; 1793:12 × 9-pounder guns; 1795:26 × 9&4-pounder guns26 × 9-pounder guns + 4 swivel guns
- Notes: Three decks

General Eliott (or General Elliott) was a British East India Company (EIC) ship, originally launched in 1782 as the East Indiaman Fletcher, but renamed before completion to honour General Elliott's defence of Gibraltar. Under the ownership of Robert Preston (later 6th Baronet), she made six voyages for the EIC and one voyage as a transport for a naval expedition. She then became a West Indiaman until she was sold for breaking up in 1802.

== Career ==
=== EIC voyage #1 (1783–1784) ===
Captain Robert Drummond sailed from Portsmouth on 17 March 1783, bound for Bombay. General Eliott reached Johanna on 28 June and arrived at Bombay on 19 July. She visited Tellicherry on 24 September, Anjengo on 4 October, and Tellicherry again on 26 October, and returned to Bombay on 10 November. She then visited Goa on 29 November, and returned to Bombay on 16 December. Homeward bound, she was at Goa on 21 January 1784, Tellicherry on 6 February, and St Helena on 5 May, and she arrived back at The Downs on 18 July.

=== EIC voyage #2 (1785–1786) ===
Captain Drummond sailed from Portsmouth on 28 March 1785. General Eliott arrived at Whampoa anchorage on 29 August. Homeward bound, she crossed the Second Bar on 27 December, reached St Helena on 25 March 1786, and arrived at The Downs on 27 May.

=== EIC voyage #3 (1787–1788) ===
Captain Robert Preston sailed from The Downs on 1 April 1787, bound for Bombay. General Eliott reached Madeira on 19 April and arrived at Bombay on 28 July. Homeward bound, she was at St Helena on 2 March 1788, and arrived at The Downs on 10 May.

=== EIC voyage #4 (1788–1790) ===
Captain Robert Drummond sailed from The Downs on 19 December 1788, bound for Bombay and China. General Eliott was at Simon's Bay on 13 March 1789, reached Bombay on 16 May, and arrived at Whampoa on 27 September. Homeward bound, she crossed the Second Bar on 8 January 1790, reached St Helena on 13 April, and arrived at The Downs on 19 June.

=== EIC voyage #5 (1792–1793) ===
Captain Drummond sailed from The Downs on 6 April 1792, bound for Bombay. General Eliott arrived at Bombay on 28 July. She visited Surat on 14 November, returned to Bombay on 30 November, returned to Surat on 5 February 1793, and returned to Bombay on 15 February. Homeward bound, she was at Tellicherry on 9 March and Calicut on 27 March. She reached St Helena on 14 June, and arrived at The Downs on 21 August.

=== EIC voyage #6 (1794–1795) ===
War with France had commenced on 1 February 1793 and Captain Robert Drummond acquired a letter of marque on 17 August 1793. However, Captain Adam Drummond acquired one on 23 December 1793.

The British government held General Elliot at Portsmouth, together with a number of other Indiamen in anticipation of using them as transports for an attack on Île de France (Mauritius). It gave up the plan and released the vessels in May 1794. It paid £1,346 12s 8d for having delayed her departure by 71 days.

General Eliott sailed from Portsmouth on 2 May 1794, bound for Bengal. She arrived at Diamond Harbour on 11 September. Homeward bound, she was at Saugor on 28 November, reached St Helena on 18 May 1795, and arrived at The Downs on 22 July.

=== West Indies expedition (1795–1796) ===
General Eliott had no sooner returned to England when she joined Admiral Hugh Cloberry Christian's expedition to the West Indies. The Government chartered General Eliott and a number of other EIC vessels, as transports. Captain Joshua Langhorne acquired a letter of marque on 30 October 1795.

The expedition sailed on 6 October, 16 November, and 9 December, but weather forced the vessels to put back. At some point General Eliott and Sulivan sustained so much damage in gales that they had to come into harbour to refit.

The fleet finally successfully sailed on 20 March to invade St Lucia, with troops under Lieutenant-General Sir Ralph Abercromby. St Lucia surrendered to the British on 25 May. The British went on to capture Saint Vincent and Grenada.

=== West Indiaman ===
General Eliott was sold into the West Indies trade in 1796. On 25 February 1798 her officers and crew (some 70 persons in all), abandoned her on the Goodwin Sands as she was returning from Jamaica. A Danish vessel took them aboard. Although she was taking on water, and had lost her rudder, cables, and anchors, she continued to float. Boats came from shore and salvaged her. Estimates were that the salvors would earn £10,000 for their efforts. The Royal Navy frigate HMS Astraea and ship of the line HMS Veteran towed General Elliot in to Great Yarmouth, Norfolk.

== Fate ==
General Eliott was sold in 1802 for breaking up.
