= Longannet coal mine =

Coordinates: 56°3′31″N 3°41′32″W

Longannet coal mine was a deep mine complex in Fife, Scotland.

== History ==
Longannet was the remnant of three mines, established in the 1960s. Built on the north side of the Firth of Forth, east of Kincardine, it connected with the Bogside, Castlehill and Solsgirth Collieries, forming a single, five-mile (eight-kilometre) tunnel. They provided fuel for the nearby, 2,400MW Longannet power station.

The Bogside Colliery closed in the 1980s, and by the early 1990s, the Castlehill and Solsgirth coal reserves were exhausted. Production continued from the Castlebridge area. On privatisation of the coal industry, the complex passed into the ownership of Mining Scotland and later Scottish Coal (Deep Mine) Ltd. In the late 1990s, new "roadway" tunnels were driven to access a coal seam beneath the Forth, downstream of the Kincardine Bridge. When production from Castlebridge ceased, in 2000, the northern side of the complex was sealed off and flooded. Dams were constructed, isolating the old workings from the active Kincardine working.

In March 2002, millions of gallons of water flooded into the underground workings. The 15 people below ground at the time were in another part of the mine and all were evacuated safely. Shortly after the flooding, Scottish Coal (Deep Mine) Limited, went into receivership. It became clear that no new operator would take over the mine, and all the pumps were switched off, allowing further flooding. Without access, the true cause of the flooding could not be conclusively determined by the investigation. It was concluded that one of the dams, or the surrounding strata, had probably failed, but the exact reason was not known. The design margins for the dams appeared to be adequate.

Before the site's complete flattening in 2019 the multiple buildings on the site lay derelict with most of their interiors undamaged and untouched since its abandonment in late 2002 after the liquidation of Scottish Coal (Deep Mine) Ltd. The site now lies to the North East of a Specialist Sand Facility.

Longannet was the last deep mine of any significance in Scotland and its closure effectively ended underground coal mining in Scotland. As of 2008, opencast coal mining continued in Scotland, with 51.4% of Great Britain's opencast coal mines (18 out of 35 mines) and 60.1% of the saleable production by weight (5.68 million tonnes out of 9.45 million tonnes).
