= Sulivan (1782 EIC ship) =

History

Great Britain
- Name: Sulivan
- Owner: Robert Williams
- Builder: Barnard, Deptford
- Launched: 7 November 1782
- Fate: Sold 1798

Great Britain
- Name: Washington
- Acquired: 1798 by purchase
- Fate: Sold 1805 for breaking up

General characteristics
- Tons burthen: 755, or 875, or 876, or 87654/94 (bm)
- Length: Overall:142 ft 9 in (43.5 m); Keel:114 ft 0 in (34.7 m) (keel)
- Beam: 38 ft 0 1/4 in (11.6 m)
- Depth of hold: 14 ft 10 1/2 in (4.5 m)
- Propulsion: Sails
- Sail plan: Full-rigged ship
- Complement: 1797:100; 1798:62
- Armament: 1782:20 × 12-pounder guns + 5 × 3-pounder guns (Note: Sulivan acquired her guns from Lord Holland, when Lord Holland was being broken up in August 1782.); 1797:26 × 9&6–pounder guns; 1798:2 × 6-pounder guns + 6 × 12-pounder guns + 16 × 24-pounder carronades; 1799:8 × 12-pounder guns + 20 × 24-pounder carronades
- Notes: Three decks

Sulivan (or Sullivan), was launched 1782 as an East Indiaman. She made five voyages for the British East India Company (EIC), and twice participated as a transport for military expeditions. Her owners sold her to an American and she became the British-registered vessel Washington. She was involved in a single-ship action with a French privateer shortly after her sale. She traded with America until 1805 when she was sold for breaking up.

== Career ==
=== EIC voyage #1 (1783-1784) ===
Captain Stephen Williams sailed from Portsmouth on 16 March 1783, bound for Bombay and China. Sulivan reached São Tiago on 10 April and Johanna on 19 August; she arrived at Bombay on 20 September.

There the government chartered Sulivan to shuttle troops up and down the coast in connection with the siege of Mangalore. On she was at Tellicherry on 23 November, Cochin on 1 December, Tellicherry on 11 December, Mangalore on 28 January 1784, and Tellicherry on 4 February. She returned to Bombay on 11 March.

She then sailed for China. She reached Tellicherry on 23 April and Malacca on 1 June before arriving at Whampoa anchorage on 7 July. Homeward bound, she crossed the Second Bar on 5 November, reached St Helena on 24 March 1785, and arrived at The Downs on 11 June.

=== EIC voyage #2 (1785-1787) ===
Captain Robert Pouncy sailed from The Downs on 23 December 1785, bound for Madras and China. Sulivan reached Madeira on 17 January 1786 and the Cape of Good Hope on 8 April, and arrived at Madras on 6 June. Bound for China, she reached Malacca on 25 August, and arrived at Whampoa on 29 September. Homeward bound, she crossed the Second Bar on 14 February 1787, reached St Helena on 26 May, and arrived at The Downs on 28 July.

=== EIC voyage #3 (1789-1790) ===
Captain Pouncy sailed from Portsmouth on 27 February 1789, bound for Madras and China. Sulivan reached Madras on 11 June. Bound for China, she reached Penang on 11 August, and arrived at Whampoa on 21 September. Homeward bound, she crossed the Second Bar on 19 December, reached St Helena on 1 March 1790, and arrived at The Downs on 18 May.

=== EIC voyage #4 (1792-1793) ===
Captain Pouncy sailed from Plymouth on 8 April 1792, bound for Bombay and China. Sulivan arrived at Bombay on 28 July. She arrived at Whampoa on 13 January 1793. Homeward bound, she crossed the Second Bar on 26 February, reached St Helena on 14 June, and arrived at The Downs on 21 August.

=== EIC voyage #5 (1794-1795) ===
War with France had broken out in 1793. Captain Sampson Hall was ready to sail when the British government held Sulivan at Portsmouth, together with 38 other Indiamen in anticipation of using them as transports for an attack on Île de France (Mauritius). It gave up the plan and released the vessels in May 1794. It paid £456 6s 8d for having delayed her departure by 22 days.

Captain Hall sailed from Portsmouth on 2 May 1794, bound for China. Sulivan arrived at Whampoa on 13 October. Homeward bound, she crossed the Second Bar on 30 December, reached St Helena on 13 April, and arrived at The Downs on 23 July.

=== West Indies Expedition (1795-96) ===
The Admiralty chartered Sulivan as a troopship for Admiral Hugh Cloberry Christian's expedition to the West Indies. She sailed for the West Indies on 9 December, but bad weather delayed the start of the expedition and the vessels had to put back to England. At some point General Eliott and Sulivan sustained so much damage in gales that they had to come into harbour to refit.

After numerous false starts aborted by weather issues, the fleet sailed on 26 April to invade St Lucia, with troops under Lieutenant-General Sir Ralph Abercromby. St Lucia surrendered to the British on 25 May. The British went on to capture Saint Vincent and Grenada.

=== EIC voyage #6 (1797-1798) ===
Captain Hall acquired a letter of marque on 10 March 1797, and sailed from Portsmouth on 6 April, bound for Bombay. Sulivan arrived at Bombay on 20 July. She then visited several ports on the Malabar Coast. She was at Tellicherry on 12 September, Cochin on 18 September, Anjengo on 20 September, Quilon on 10 October, Cochin again on 21 October, Calicut on 5 November, and Mahé on 15 November. She returned to Bombay on 29 November. Homeward bound she was at the Cape on 26 April 1798, reached St Helena on 26 May, and arrived at The Downs on 2 August.

=== Transatlantic trader ===
In 1798 Thomas Ketland, Philadelphia, U.S.A., purchased Sulivan and renamed her Washington. Washington entered Lloyd's Register in 1799 with Williamson, master, Kentland, owner, and trade London–Philadelphia.

==== Action with a French privateer (1799) ====
On 18 September 1799 Washington sailed from Gravesend, bound for Philadelphia.

On 24 October Washington encountered a French privateer at 48°30′N 8°50′W. The privateer attacked although Washington hoisted American colours. (This may have been a consequence of the Quasi-War.) The vessels exchanged fire over a four hours, including more than two hours of intense combat, with the result that both vessels sustained extensive damage to masts, sails, and rigging. Washington lost one man killed and had two wounded. She went into Lisbon for repairs. There she found out that on the 27th or the 28th, the French privateer Bellone had come into A Coruña for repairs after having unsuccessfully attacked an American ship. Bellona had suffered 37 dead and 28 wounded. The casualty disparity is surprising as Washington never was able to deploy more than 23 guns and had only 62 crew, whereas Bellona had twenty-six brass 12-pounder guns and four 32-pounder carronades, and 240 men. Two of Washington's 6-pounder guns were unavailable (one was stowed and one was foul), and in an initial exchange of broadsides, recoil dismounted five or six carronades; these the crew were able to remount during a lull in the engagement. However, throughout the engagement Bellona fired at Washington's rigging, while Washington fired at Bellona's hull.

One of the passengers on Washington was the American Secretary of State, Timothy Pickering. Another passenger was Robert Leslie, who was travelling with his wife and children. During the action the women and children took refuge in the hold.

On the 26th another privateer approached, but a warning shot from Washington hit the privateer, which then veered off. Washington arrived at Lisbon on the 30th. She was detained there for five months and two days while she was being repaired, which repairs cost £12,000, with a deduction of £2000 for old materials.

Washington left Lisbon on 31 March 1800, and that same day a gale took away her new main top mast. One seaman was killed when he went overboard, but a boy saved himself by hanging on to the shrouds.

In the evening of 3 April, a warship approached and Washington cleared for action. Fortunately the stranger turned out to be HMS Seahorse.

Washington arrived at Philadelphia on 11 May, 42 days after leaving Lisbon, and seven months and 26 days after leaving London.

==== Other incidents ====
In 1795, the U.S. Government decided to purchase gun-locks from the British firm Ketland & Co., of London and Birmingham, placing the order through the firm's Philadelphia office, which was under the direction of James and Thomas Ketland. Further orders followed. There exists an invoice from Ketland & Walker dated 15 July 1800, for 1,553 locks shipped to Philadelphia on Washington, James Williamson, master.

In December 1804, Thomas Ketland of Philadelphia, merchant, stated in a petition that he, John Ketland, and James Williamson, in June 1799 were owners of the ship Washington. She had arrived at Philadelphia in May 1800 brought a cargo that she then took to Batavia. The owners were claiming a drawback of customs duties they had paid on the importation by virtue of the exportation. Such drawbacks were available to American vessels, but Washington was not registered in the U.S. as only vessels built in America were accepted for registration. There were some other issues as well. Their petition was denied.

Lloyd's Register for 1805 showed the same information as in 1799. The volume for 1806 no longer listed Washington.

== Fate ==
On 12 November 1805 Washington was sold at Lloyd's Coffee House for breaking up.
