= Preston baronets =

Set index for Preston baronets

There have been four baronetcies created for persons with the surname Preston, two in the Baronetage of Nova Scotia, one in the Baronetage of England and another in the Baronetage of the United Kingdom.

- Preston baronets of Airdrie (1628)
- Preston baronets of Valleyfield (1637)
- Preston baronets of Furness (1644)
- Preston baronets of Beeston St Lawrence (1815)
