= Michael Hicks-Beach (1760–1830) =

British politician

Michael Hicks-Beach (1760–1830) was the member of Parliament for the constituency of Cirencester for the parliaments of 1794 to 1818. He owned the Manor of Chigwell in Essex.

He was the son of Sir Howe Hicks, 6th Baronet, and the brother of Sir William Hicks, 7th Baronet. His elder son Michael Beach Hicks-Beach was the father of Sir Michael Hicks Beach, 8th Baronet, and his younger son William Beach was also an MP.
