= Ashburnham =

Ashburnham may refer to:

- Ashburnham, East Sussex, England
  - Ashburnham Place, a country house in that village, the ancestral home of the Ashburnham family
- Ashburnham, Massachusetts, United States
- Ashburnham, Ontario, Canada, a village annexed by the city of Peterborough in 1904
- Ashburnham (surname)
- Earl of Ashburnham
- John Ashburnham (disambiguation)
- Ashburnham baronets
- Ashburnham House, London, place of the 1731 Ashburnham House fire
