= Ashburnham (surname) =

Ashburnham is a surname, and may refer to:

- Bertram Ashburnham, 4th Earl of Ashburnham (1797–1878), British peer
- Bertram Ashburnham, 5th Earl of Ashburnham (1840–1913), British peer
- Charlotte Ashburnham, Countess of Ashburnham (1776–1862), formerly Lady Charlotte Percy
- Cromer Ashburnham (1831–1917), British Army officer
- Denny Ashburnham (c.1628–1697), English landowner and politician
- George Ashburnham, 3rd Earl of Ashburnham (1760–1830), British peer
- George Ashburnham, Viscount St Asaph (1785–1813), British politician
- John Ashburnham (MP for Winchelsea) English politician
- John Ashburnham (Royalist) (1603–1671), English courtier, diplomat and politician
- John Ashburnham, 1st Baron Ashburnham (1656–1710), English landowner and politician
- John Ashburnham, 2nd Earl of Ashburnham (1724–1812), British peer and courtier
- Thomas Ashburnham (MP) (by 1462–1523), English politician
- Thomas Ashburnham (general) (1816–1872), Commander of British Troops in China and Hong Kong
- Thomas Ashburnham, 6th Earl of Ashburnham (1855–1924), British peer
- William Ashburnham (Royalist) (c.1604–1679) was an English army officer and MP
- William Ashburnham, 2nd Baron Ashburnham (1679–1710), English landowner and politician
- Sir William Ashburnham, 2nd Baronet (1678–1755), British politician
- Sir William Ashburnham, 4th Baronet (1710–1797), Church of England priest
- Sir William Ashburnham, 5th Baronet (1739–1823), British politician
