= John Ashburnham =

John Ashburnham may refer to:

- John Ashburnham (died 1417), MP for Sussex
- John Ashburnham (MP for Winchelsea) (by 1483–1518/23)
- John Ashburnham II (by 1528–1562/63), MP for Sussex
- John Ashburnham (Royalist) (1603–1671), English Member of Parliament for Hastings and Sussex, his son
- John Ashburnham, 1st Baron Ashburnham (1656–1710), his grandson, English peer
- John Ashburnham, 1st Earl of Ashburnham (1687–1737), his son, British Member of Parliament for Hastings
- John Ashburnham, 2nd Earl of Ashburnham (1724–1812), his son, Lord Lieutenant of Sussex
- Sir John Ashburnham, 7th Baronet (1770–1854) of the Ashburnham baronets

== See also ==
- Ashburnham (disambiguation)
