= Bertram Ashburnham =

Bertram Ashburnham may refer to:

- Bertram Ashburnham, 4th Earl of Ashburnham (1797–1878), British peer
- Bertram Ashburnham, 5th Earl of Ashburnham (1840–1913), British peer
- Bertram Ashburnham (Constable of Dover Castle) (c. 1010–1066), British peer
