= Crowhurst, East Sussex =

Village in East Sussex, England

Coordinates: 50.89°N 0.50°E

Crowhurst
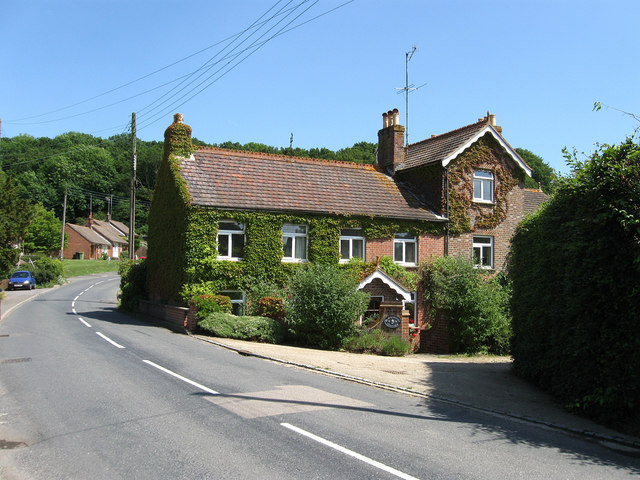
- Blacksmiths Cottage, Crowhurst

- Location within East Sussex
- Area: 10.1 km^{2} (3.9 sq mi)
- Population: 891 (Parish-2011)
  - Density: 219/sq mi (85/km^{2})
- OS grid reference: TQ755125
  - London: 50 miles (80 km) NNW
- District: Rother
- Shire county: East Sussex
- Region: South East
- Country: England
- Sovereign state: United Kingdom
- Post town: BATTLE
- Postcode district: TN33
- Dialling code: 01424
- Police: Sussex
- Fire: East Sussex
- Ambulance: South East Coast
- UK Parliament: Bexhill and Battle
- Website: Crowhurst Village

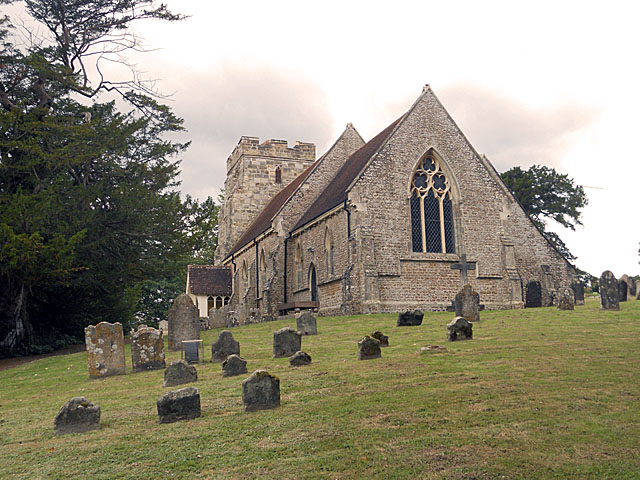
St Georges Churchyard, Crowhurst from the south east. The ancient yew tree is on the left.

Crowhurst is an isolated village situated five miles (8 km) north-west of Hastings in East Sussex. It has a parish council and is located within the Rother District Council.

== The village ==
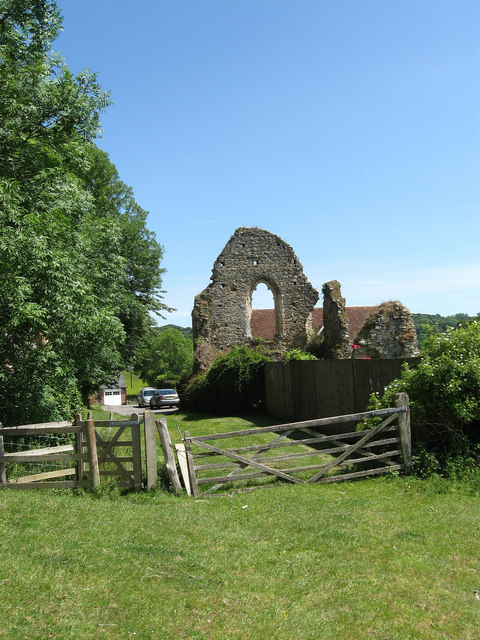
The ruins of the manor house at Crowhurst

The parish church is dedicated to St George. The ruins of the manor house lie to the south of it.

Although small, the village does have a railway station on the London to Hastings line. It was built in 1902 as a junction station for a branch line to Bexhill. The line crossed nearby marshes on a 17-arch viaduct; the line was closed under the so-called "Beeching cuts" in 1964, and the viaduct was demolished in 1969.

The village has a primary school. The village post office closed in March 2008: until then it served as a convenience store also. There is a pub, The Plough; until 1998 there was a second pub, The Inn at Crowhurst.

== History ==
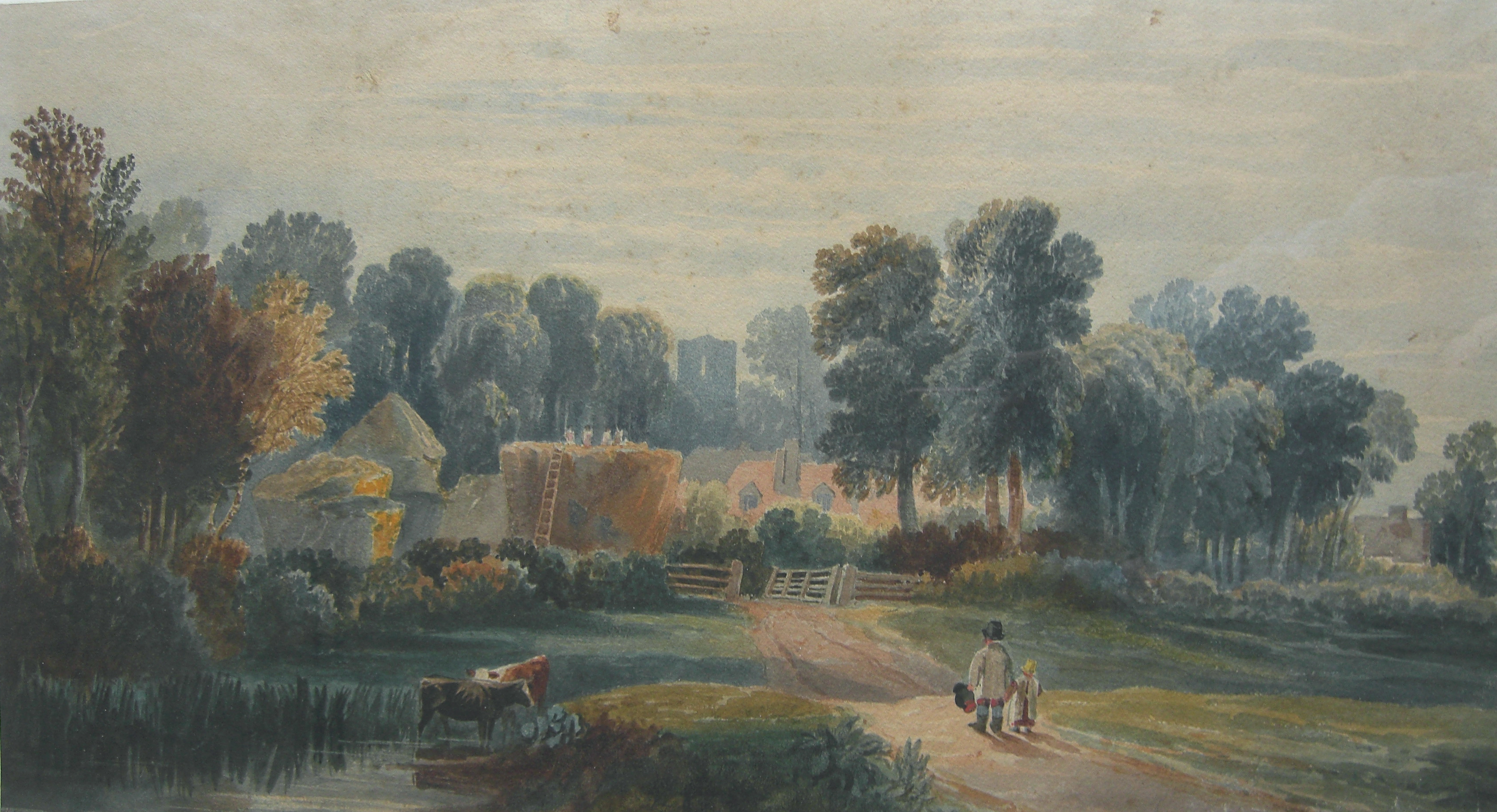
Crowhurst in 1820, by Henry Harris Lines

The earliest mention of the settlement is in 771, when King Offa of Mercia gave the Bishop of Selsey a piece of land here; a church was then built by the Bishop. Crowhurst (then called Croghyrst) itself remained the king's land until 1412, although various landowners were given possession of it over that time:

- Robert Count of Eu, after the Norman Conquest of England
- the Fitz-Lambert family, until the 12th century
- Walter de Scotney, given by Richard I after the Third Crusade, although Walter forfeited it in 1259, having been found guilty of a crime
- Sir John Pelham, given to him by Henry IV in 1412; Pelham built the present parish church

Crowhurst was a centre of the Wealden ironworking industry.

== Religion ==
=== St George's Church ===
The Norman church is dedicated to St George. A 4000 year old yew tree in the church yard testifies to the location as likely being a sacred place in pagan times.

The church is of simple design, and all ornamentation was removed during the Puritan times of the 17th century. It is an architecturally Grade II listed building . It was mostly built from the 12th to the 15th centuries. The body of the church appears to have been 11th or 12th century in origin, but was largely rebuilt in 1794 and again completely in 1856. The oldest remaining part is the 15th century tower of sandstone ashlar.

A nearby flying bomb explosion destroyed much of the original stained glass in 1944.

=== Crowhurst Christian Healing Centre ===
The Crowhurst Christian Healing Centre (CCHC) is an Anglican healing retreat, located at The Old Rectory on Forewood Lane. It was founded in 1928 as the Divine Healing Mission by the Australian faith healer James Moore Hickson.

== Landmarks ==
The ruins of the ancient manor house originally built by Walter de Scotney in 1250 stand in a private garden just south of the churchyard. It was rebuilt and enlarged by John, Earl of Richmond between 1357 and 1360.

The village is home to the Fore Wood RSPB reserve, part of which is a Site of Special Scientific Interest (SSSI). The interest is due to its ghyll habitat; steep ravines cut into the underlying sandstone. The site is a rich breeding area for birds.

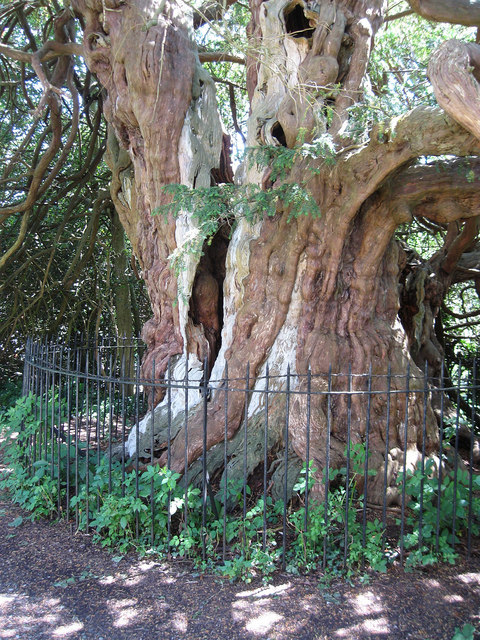
Yew Tree in St George's parish churchyard, Crowhurst, East Sussex. Legend has it that the Reeve of the Saxon King Harold was hung from the tree for refusing to reveal the location of Harold's treasure.

Like the village of the same name in Surrey, this East Sussex Crowhurst also has an ancient yew tree (Taxus baccata) in the grounds of its church which is also dedicated to St George. This has caused much confusion. The Sussex yew is cordoned off by iron railings and reinforced with steel wires to prevent collapse. The tree's age is uncertain but estimates range from 1,300 to 4000 years.

Another SSSI within the parish is Combe Haven. This site is of biological importance due to its diversity of habitat supporting many species of flora and fauna. Alluvial meadows and reed beds cover a large section of the area.

Crowhurst is located within the heart of the Sussex Weald in the designated High Weald Area of Outstanding Natural Beauty.

== Governance ==
At a local level, Crowhurst is governed by a parish council which is responsible for street lighting, allotments and recreational areas. It provides a local voice to the district and county councils. The parish council consists of seven councillors. The May 2007 election had ten candidates standing.

Rother District council provides the next level of government with services such as refuse collection, planning consent, leisure amenities and council tax collection. Crowhurst is within the Crowhurst ward, along with the parishes of Ashburnham, Catsfield, Penhurst and part of Battle. In the May 2007 election Crowhurst ward was won by the Conservative candidate. The population of this ward at the 2011 census was 2,686.

East Sussex county council is the third tier of government, providing education, libraries and highway maintenance. Crowhurst falls within the Battle and Crowhurst ward. Kathryn Margaret Field, Liberal Democrat, was elected in the May 2005 election with 48.8% of the vote.

The UK Parliament constituency for Crowhurst is Bexhill and Battle. Huw Merriman was elected in the May 2015 election.

== In film ==
A fictionalised version of medieval Crowhurst was presented in the 2009 docudrama 1066 The Battle for Middle Earth, produced by Channel 4.
