= Earl of Ashburnham =

Earldom in the Peerage of Great Britain

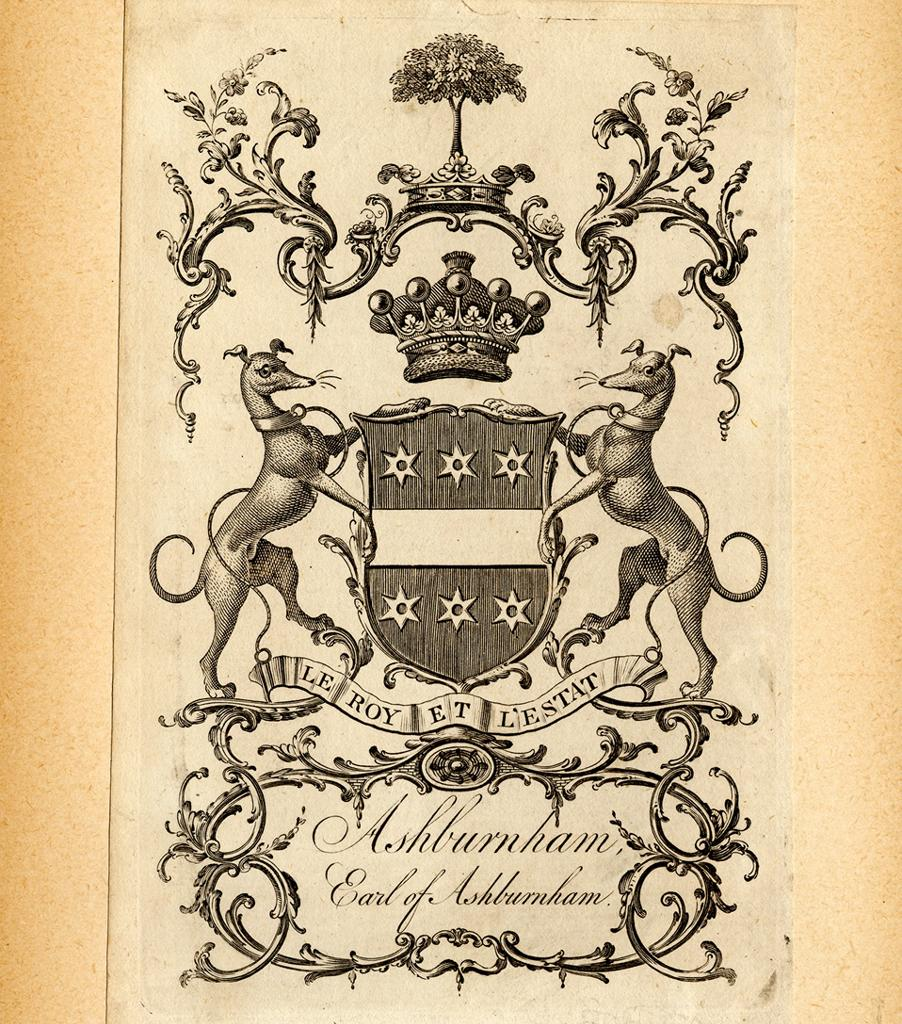
Bookplate showing the coat of arms of the Earls of Ashburnham

Earl of Ashburnham (pronounced "Ash-burn-am"), of Ashburnham in the County of Sussex, was a title in the Peerage of Great Britain created in 1730 for John Ashburnham, 3rd Baron Ashburnham, who was also created Viscount St Asaph, in Wales.

Baron Ashburnham was created in the Peerage of England in 1689 for John Ashburnham, grandson of the John Ashburnham who helped King Charles I escape from Oxford and Hampton Court Palace. He obtained from the King, for his London seat, the Westminster Abbey Prior's House, which had been seized by the Crown during the dissolution of the monasteries. He rebuilt it and renamed it Ashburnham House; it now stands as one of the central buildings of Westminster School, and has given the family name to one of the co-ed day houses.

The titles all became extinct in 1924, with the death of the 6th Earl. The surviving member of the family was Lady Mary Catherine Charlotte Ashburnham (1890–1953), daughter of the 5th Earl.

The family's wealth was substantially drawn from the Welsh village of Pembrey; as late as 1873 the earls owned 7,568 acres in Wales. They also carried on the iron industry at their extensive landholdings across Sussex.

The 2nd and 3rd Earls of Ashburnham were successful courtiers. The 4th Earl bought a famous collection of Illuminated manuscripts, which was sold by the 5th Earl, mostly to the British Library, although the Ashburnham Pentateuch is in Paris. The 5th Earl sold off most of the painting collection, including one of Rembrandt's self-portraits. He was a supporter of the Spanish Carlist claimant, Juan, Count of Montizón.

The country seat of the Earls of Ashburnham was Ashburnham Place in Sussex. It was occupied by the 6th earl's niece, Lady Catherine Ashburnham (1890–1953), until her death in 1953, and subsequently the contents were sold in 1953 and the land in 1953–1957. The estate was inherited by the Reverend John Bickersteth (1926–1991). The house was reduced in size and turned into a Christian conference centre, which caters to both individuals and groups.

== Barons Ashburnham (1689) ==
- John Ashburnham, 1st Baron Ashburnham (1656–1710)
- William Ashburnham, 2nd Baron Ashburnham (1679–1710)
- John Ashburnham, 3rd Baron Ashburnham (1687–1737; created Earl of Ashburnham in 1730)

== Earls of Ashburnham (1730) ==
- John Ashburnham, 1st Earl of Ashburnham (1687–1737)
- John Ashburnham, 2nd Earl of Ashburnham (1724–1812)
- George Ashburnham, 3rd Earl of Ashburnham (1760–1830)
  - George Ashburnham, Viscount St Asaph (1785–1813)
- Bertram Ashburnham, 4th Earl of Ashburnham (1797–1878)
- Bertram Ashburnham, 5th Earl of Ashburnham (1840–1913)
- Thomas Ashburnham, 6th Earl of Ashburnham (1855–1924)

== Toponymy ==
Ashburnham County in New South Wales, Australia, was named after the 4th Earl.
