= Petit Livre d'Amour =

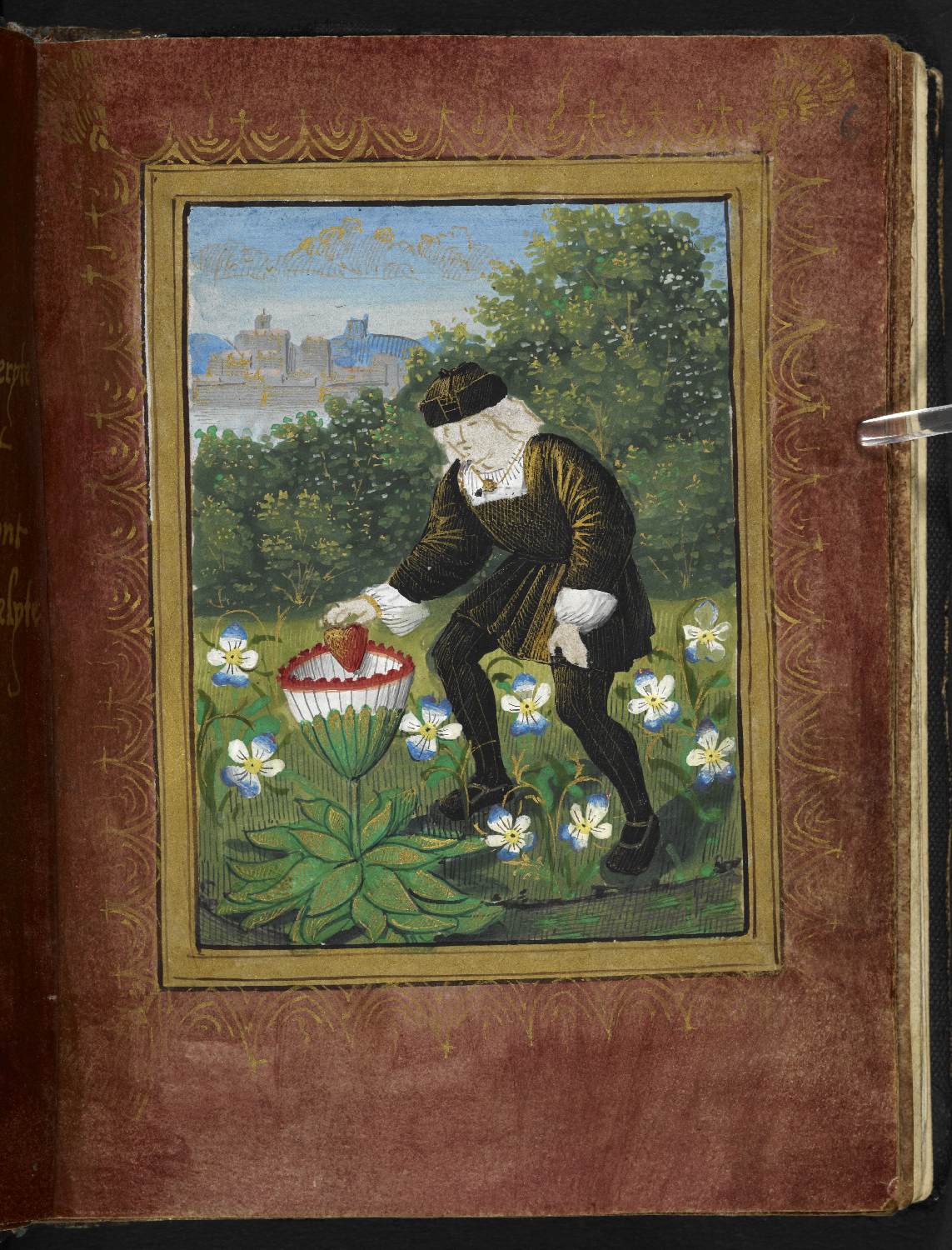
The miniature on f. 6r.

The Petit Livre d'Amour (British Library Stowe MS 955) is a collection of love poems (also known as Emblesmes et Devises d'Amour), written in c. 1500 by Pierre Sala (1457–1529), an antiquary and valet de chambre of Louis XII.

The poems extend to 18 folia (ff. 1r-17v, including a supernumerary fol. 9* inserted after fol. 9) and are followed by an 18th-century transcription of the same poems (ff. 18r-34r). It is dedicated by the author to his mistress and future wife, Marguerite Bullioud. The poems are in French, except for one in Italian, Segua piano filliolo myo (f. 7v). The manuscript also includes 13 miniatures in colours and gold (on the recto of foll. 6 to 17), the one on f. 6r depicting Pierre Sala dropping his heart into a marguerite flower (viz. the namesake of his mistress'). Each miniature is facing a quatrain inscribed on a placard or scroll, accompanied above and below by the initials 'M' and 'P'. The miniature on f. 17r is a portrait of Pierre Sala. The painter is identified as the Master of the Chronique scandaleuse (according to Avril and Reynaud 1993), except for the portrait, attributed to Jean Perréal (b. after 1450 - d. after 1530).

Manuscript measures are 13 cm x 9,5 cm and it was protected in a small case made of wood and golden green leather.

The manuscript was formerly in possession of Jean-Andoche Junot (1771–1813), Richard Temple-Nugent-Brydges-Chandos-Grenville, 1st Duke of Buckingham and Chandos, of Stowe House, near Buckingham (1776–1839) and his son Richard Plantagenet (1797–1861), who in 1849 sold it to Bertram Ashburnham, 4th Earl of Ashburnham. It was acquired by the British Museum with the other Stowe manuscripts in 1883. A high-quality facsimile of the manuscript was published in 1994.

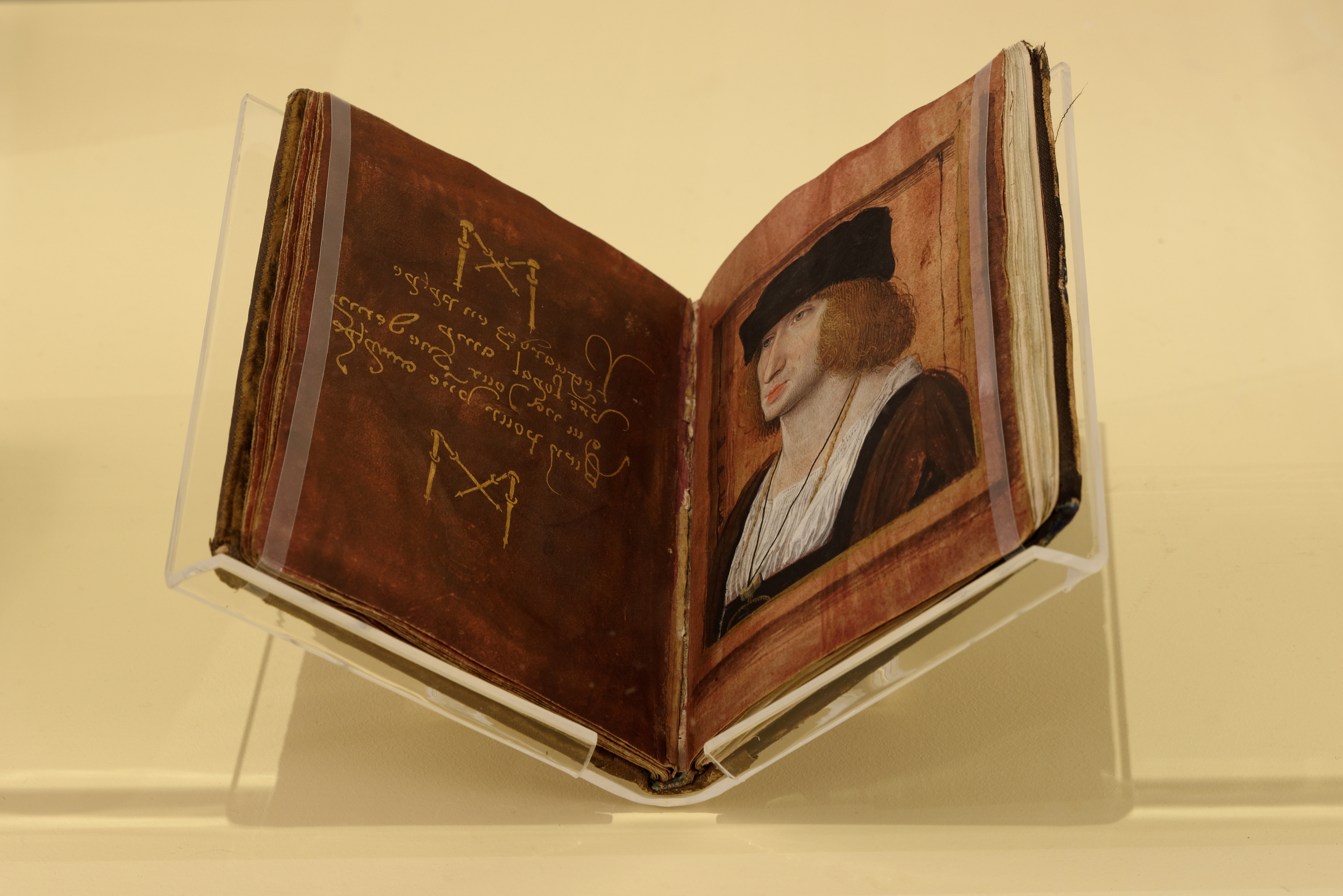
Petit Livre d'Amour, in exhibition in Museum of Fine Arts of Lyon 2015-2016

The manuscript and its case was lent to French Museum of Fine Arts of Lyon, for exhibition 'Lyon Renaissance. Arts et humanisme' from October 2015 to January 2016.
