= Catsfield =

Village in East Sussex, England

Coordinates: 50.90°N 0.45°E

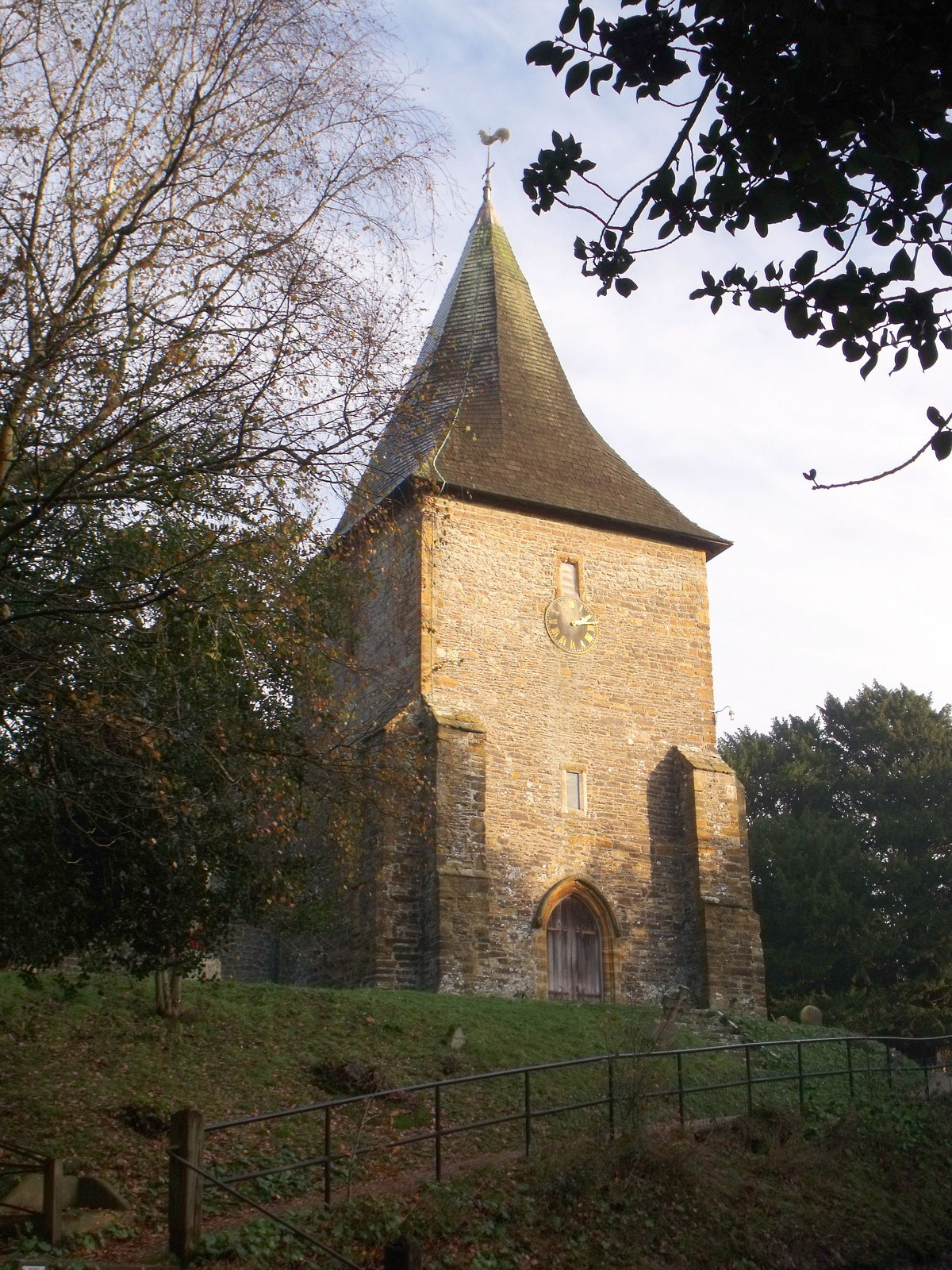
- St Laurence Church

- Location within East Sussex
- Area: 12.2 km^{2} (4.7 sq mi)
- Population: 891 (2011)
  - Density: 177/sq mi (68/km^{2})
- OS grid reference: TQ725136
  - London: 49 miles (79 km) NNW
- District: Rother
- Shire county: East Sussex
- Region: South East
- Country: England
- Sovereign state: United Kingdom
- Post town: BATTLE
- Postcode district: TN33
- Dialling code: 01424
- Police: Sussex
- Fire: East Sussex
- Ambulance: South East Coast
- UK Parliament: Bexhill and Battle

Catsfield is a village and civil parish in the Rother district of East Sussex, England. It is located six miles (9.7 km) north of Bexhill, and three miles (5 km) southwest of Battle.

The village was first documented in the Domesday Book of 1086 where it was recorded "there is a little church serving the hall". It is one of the oldest settlements in the area, with Romano British period archaeological remains.

The village once consisted of two manors: Catsfield and Catsfield Levett. Thomas Lyvet (Levett) held the lordship of the manor of Catsfield in 1445 but forfeited it, along with the lordship of Firle, for his debts. But the manor of Catsfield Levett remained in the Levett family for centuries, and in the seventeenth century a Levett heiress carried it into the Eversfield family. (Richard Lyvet of Firle was lord of the manor of Catsfield in 1431.) With a fortune built on ancestral landholdings and later on iron making, the Levetts held land across Sussex. The parish church is dedicated to St Laurence.

Catsfield is located in the Sussex Weald within the designated landscape the High Weald Area of Outstanding Natural Beauty.

== Governance ==
At a local level, Catsfield is governed by a parish council which is responsible for street lighting, allotments and recreational areas. They provide a local voice to the district and county councils. The parish council consists of seven councillors. In the May 2007 election, the seven councillors were uncontested.

Rother District council provides the next level of government with services such as refuse collection, planning consent, leisure amenities and council tax collection. Catsfield is within the Crowhurst ward, along with the parishes of Ashburnham, Crowhurst, Penhurst, and part of Battle. In the May 2007 election Crowhurst ward was won by the Conservative candidate.

East Sussex county council is the third tier of government, providing education, libraries and highway maintenance. Catsfield falls within the Battle and Crowhurst ward. Kathryn Margaret Field, Liberal Democrat, was elected in the May 2005 election with 48.8% of the vote.

The UK Parliament constituency for Catsfield is Bexhill and Battle. Huw Merriman was elected in the May 2015 election.

At a European level, before the United Kingdom left the European Union in 2020, Catsfield was represented by the South-East region, which held ten seats in the European Parliament.

== Landmarks ==
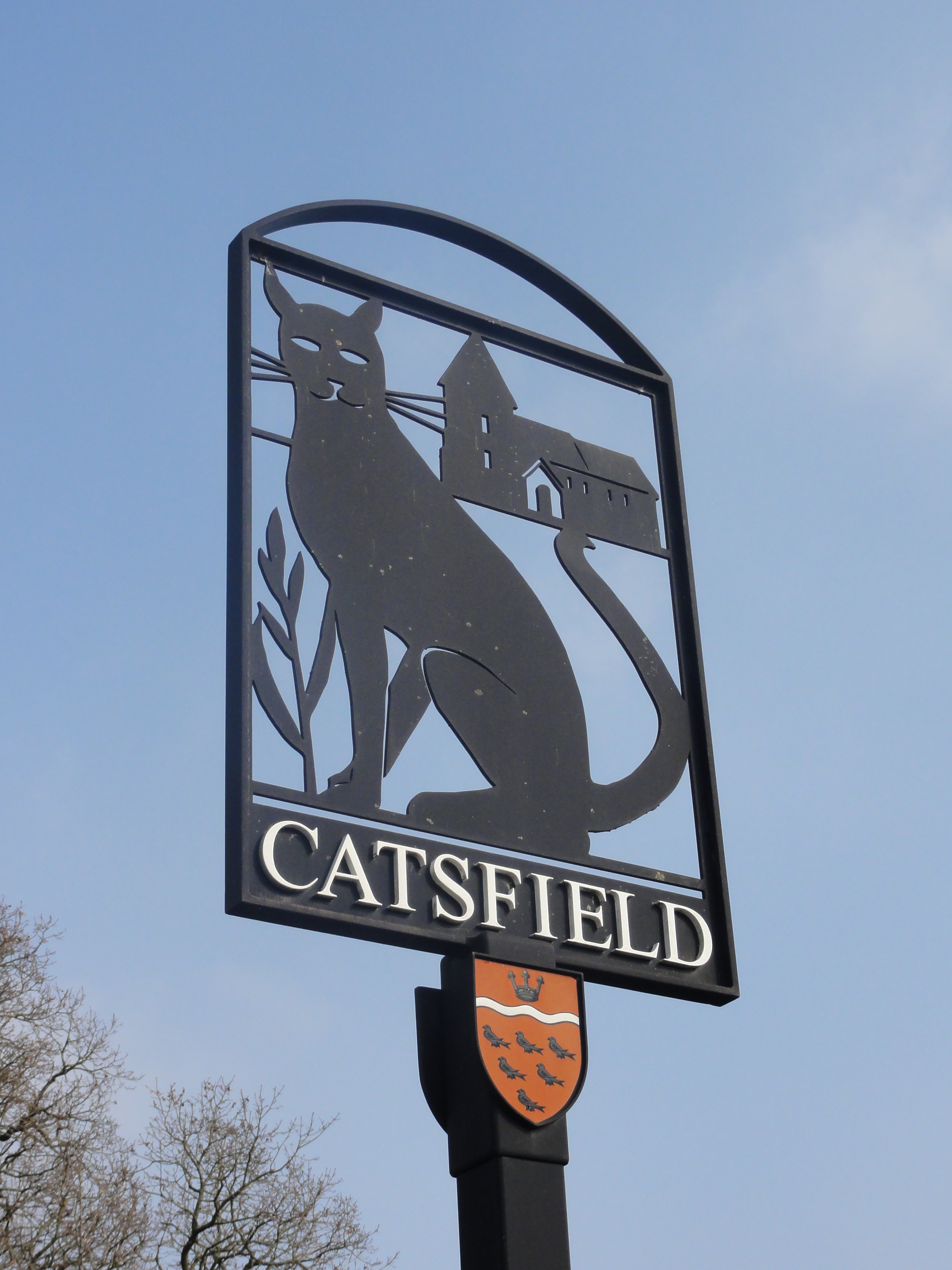
The village sign

The Site of Special Scientific Interest Ashburnham Park is partly within the parish.

The National Monuments Record documents sites of Roman cremation, post-medieval iron works and architectural remains in Catsfield.

Monument No. 414618 is located within an area of ancient woodland "Twisly Wood". A Romano British cremation burial accompanied by pottery was found in 1902 during the construction of "Twisly" house. While excavating for a rain-water drain about 6 feet from the house and at a depth of 10–12 inches, a workman James Hodgkin found a pottery vessel of about one gallon capacity. It was of earthen colour and rather soft paste. It was full of earth and in the bottom there was chalk-like material. About a yard away he found another vessel, smaller and of thinner material which contained the remains of fine bones. The British Museum assessed the smaller vessel as the remains of a small Roman vase commonly found with cremated burials.

Monument No. 414623 is located at Watermill Stream. The site of a forge having a large bay with cinder below it. The name "Hamerwyse" is given to the meadow at the site in a 13th-century document suggesting a bloomery and in a lease of 1582 it is mentioned as "lyemeweke or lyerne Forge and Foryers". A forge pond is shown on a map dated 1795. Across the valley of Watermill Stream is a breached pond-bay containing sufficient forge cinder to indicate ironworking nearby.

Monument No. 1513805 is a documented site of Pulhamite garden features within the grounds of Normanhurst Court. The features were installed in 1886 by James Pulham II (1820–1898) and James Pulham III (1845–1920).

== The Church of Saint Laurence ==
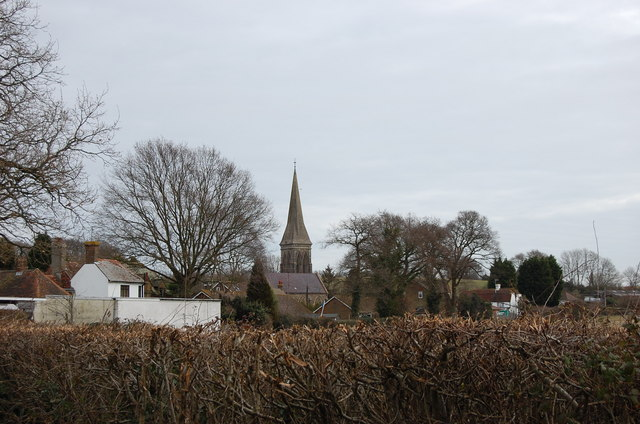
The former Methodist church

The church dates from the early medieval period: the nave is 1100, the tower late 12th century, the chancel 13th century and the tower buttresses 15th century.

The medieval church bells are hung in the tower. The first and smallest bell is inscribed "Sum Rosa Pulsata Mundi Katerina Vocata" (When I am struck I am the Rose of the World and am called Katerina); the second bell is inscribed "Dulcis Sisto Melis Campana Vocor Gabrielis" (I am the honey voiced bell called Gabriel). Both bells were cast probably in the vicinity of the church during the late 14th or early 15th century by William Wodewarde of London. The third and largest bell is said to have been the greatest ever cast by William Hull of Hailsham and has the inscription "William Hull of Hailsham made me in 1685. John Maynard, John Blaskit, Churchwardens".

The church clock was made and installed during the late 19th century by J. W. Benson of Ludgate Hill, London.

The most venerable oak of Sussex was once to be found in the churchyard dating from the time before the Conquest. It was lost in the 1960s.

The Methodist church was in existence from 1912 to 2000.

== Etymology ==
Many suggestions have been made about the origin of the name Catsfield but it is unlikely its true derivation will ever be known as the early Britons, Romans and Saxons left few written records. One theory advanced is the village takes its name from a North Saxon or Belgic tribe called the Catti, who were known to have settled in Sussex in Roman times, and another based on a tradition that a church was built in Catsfield by Saint Chad of Lichfield, or his brother St. Cedd who was active in the South East, hence Caedsfeld or Chaddesfield. The earliest written record of Catsfield (as Cedesfille) is contained in the Domesday Book of 1086.

== Phenology ==
William Markwick, an inhabitant of Catsfield and a Fellow of the Linnaean Society, made pioneering observations in phenology, the times at which natural events such as when the first call of the cuckoo is heard or when the first primrose blooms. These were published in Gilbert White's 1789 book, The Natural History and Antiquities of Selborne.
