= Stowe manuscripts =

Manuscript collection

The Stowe manuscripts are a collection of about two thousand Irish, Anglo-Saxon and later medieval manuscripts, nearly all now in the British Library. The manuscripts date from 1154 to the end of the 14th century.

The manuscripts were originally collected by the 1st Marquess of Buckingham (1753–1813) and his son, the 1st Duke of Buckingham and Chandos (1776–1839), at Stowe House near Buckingham. The antiquary and palaeographer Thomas Astle left his collection of manuscripts to the Duke when he died in 1803. The Duke subsequently purchased a collection of Irish manuscripts that had been acquired by Charles O'Conor.

The entire collection was purchased by the 4th Earl of Ashburnham in 1849, having been prepared for sale by auction following the bankruptcy of the 2nd Duke of Buckingham and Chandos. In July 1883 the 5th Earl of Ashburnham sold the Stowe manuscript collection to the British government for £45,000. The English material was placed in the British Museum and the Irish manuscripts went, initially on loan, to the Royal Irish Academy in Dublin.

Several Ireland-related manuscripts from the collection were allocated to the Royal Irish Academy (R.I.A.) in Dublin, with the cumdach or book-shrine of the Stowe Missal subsequently being transferred to the National Museum of Ireland. Amongst the manuscripts transferred by the British Government to the R.I.A. in 1883 was 'Manuscript C' of The Annals of the Four Masters, one of the four original manuscript volumes of that famous history of Ireland.

The 1085 Stowe manuscripts at the British Library continue to be catalogued as a separate, closed, collection.

== Some manuscripts ==
All are illuminated, and are now in the British Library, unless stated:

- Stowe Missal - Irish c. 750, 67 leaves and now in the Royal Irish Academy
- Stowe Psalter - late Anglo-Saxon
- Stowe Breviary - English, early 14th century
- Stowe MS 17, Maastricht Hours, early 14th century book of hours
- Stowe MS 54 (Histoire ancienne), early 15th century ancient history
- Stowe MS 594, Bruges Garter Book, 15th century Anglo-Norman
- Stowe MS 955 Petit Livre d'Amour, early 15th century manuscript of French humanist Pierre Sala

== Images ==
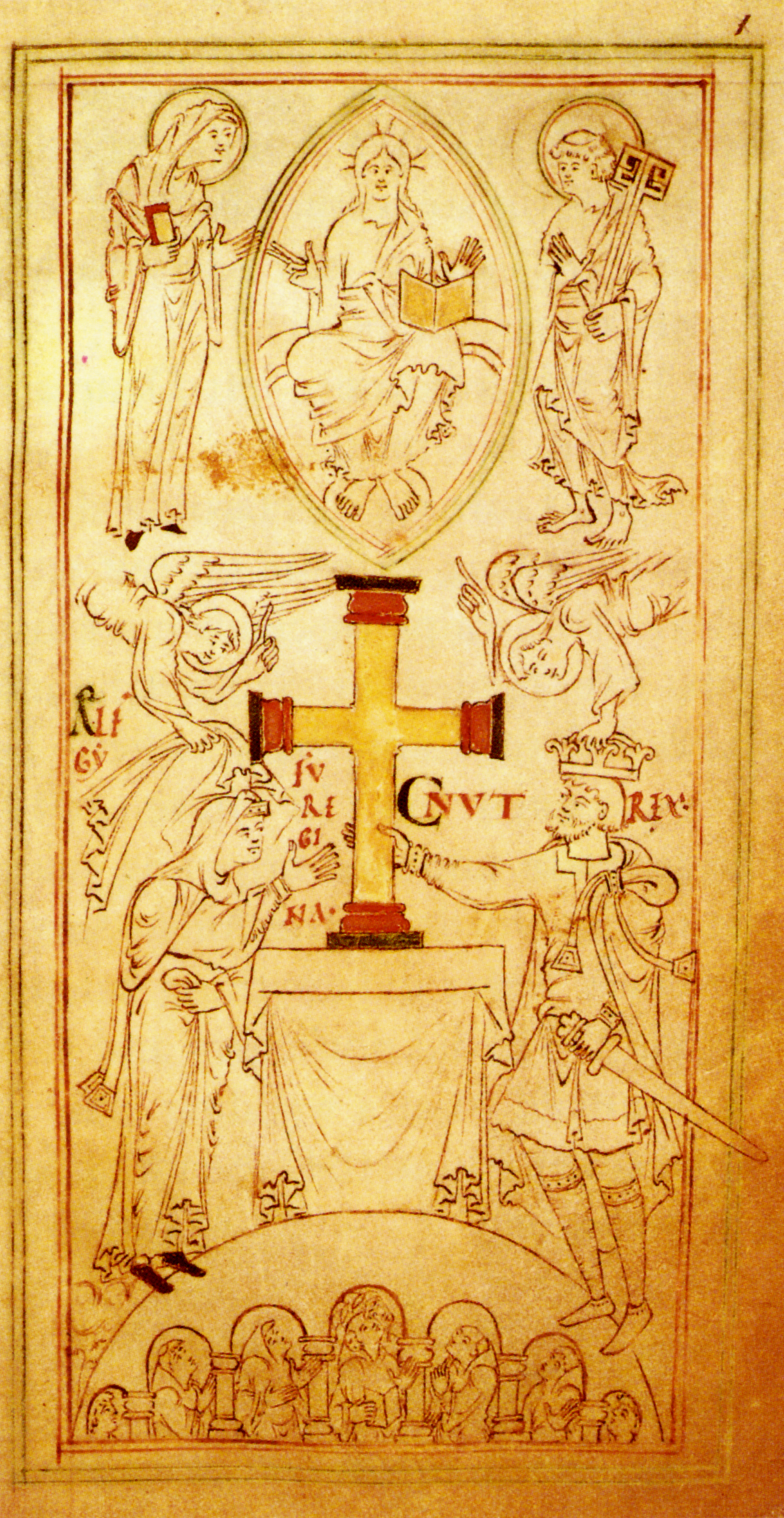
Page from Stowe MS 944, fol. 6, depicting King Cnut and Emma of Normandy

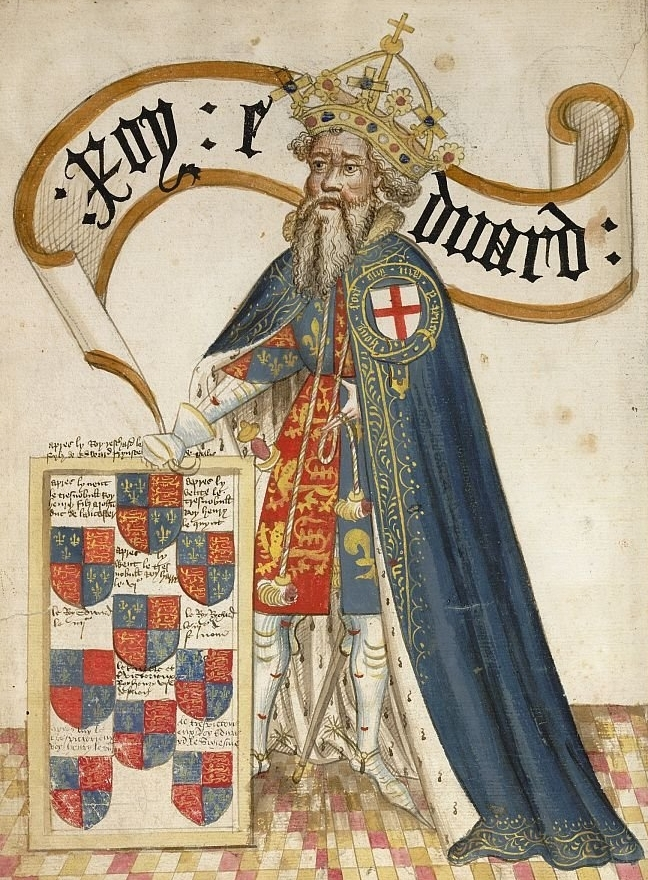
Page f.7v from Stowe MS 594, Edward III, King of England. Bruges Garter Book.

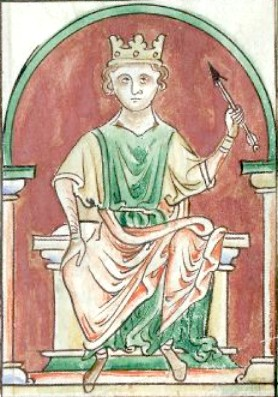
