= Guglielmo Libri Carucci dalla Sommaja =

Italian count and mathematician (1803–1869)

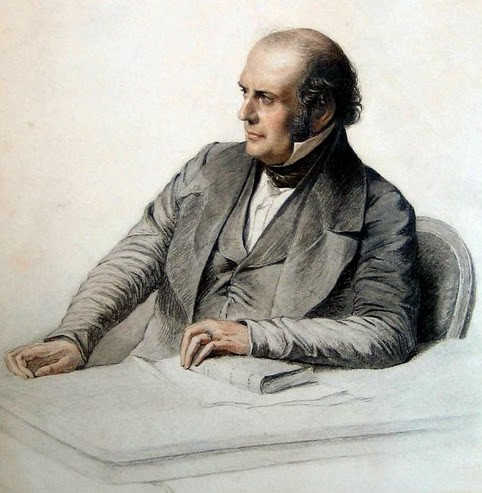
- Born: 1 January 1803; Florence, Grand Duchy of Tuscany
- Died: 28 September 1869 (aged 66); Fiesole, Kingdom of Italy
- Education: Degree in mathematics (1820)
- Alma mater: University of Pisa
- Occupation: Professor of mathematics
- Known for: Book and manuscript theft

Guglielmo Libri Carucci dalla Sommaja (1 January 1803 – 28 September 1869) was an Italian count and mathematician, who became known for his love and subsequent theft of ancient and precious manuscripts. After being appointed the Inspector of Libraries in France, Libri began stealing the books he was responsible for. He fled to England when the theft was discovered, along with 30,000 books and manuscripts inside 18 trunks. In France, he was sentenced to 10 years in jail in absentia; some of the stolen works were returned when he died, but many remained missing.

== Life ==
=== In Italy ===
Libri was born on New Year's Day, 1 January 1803 in Florence, Italy. He entered the University of Pisa in 1816, starting to study law, but soon switching to mathematics. He graduated in 1820, his first works being praised by Babbage, Cauchy, and Gauss.

In 1823, at the age of 20, he was appointed Professor of Mathematical Physics at Pisa, but did not relish teaching and the following year went on sabbatical leave, travelling to Paris. There, he became friends with many of the most prominent French mathematicians of the day, including Germain, Laplace, Poisson, Ampère, Fourier and Arago. Upon his return to Italy, he became involved in politics, conspiring with the secret society of the Carbonari to advocate a liberal constitution in the Grand Duchy of Tuscany. Faced with arrest and prosecution, he fled to France.

=== In France ===
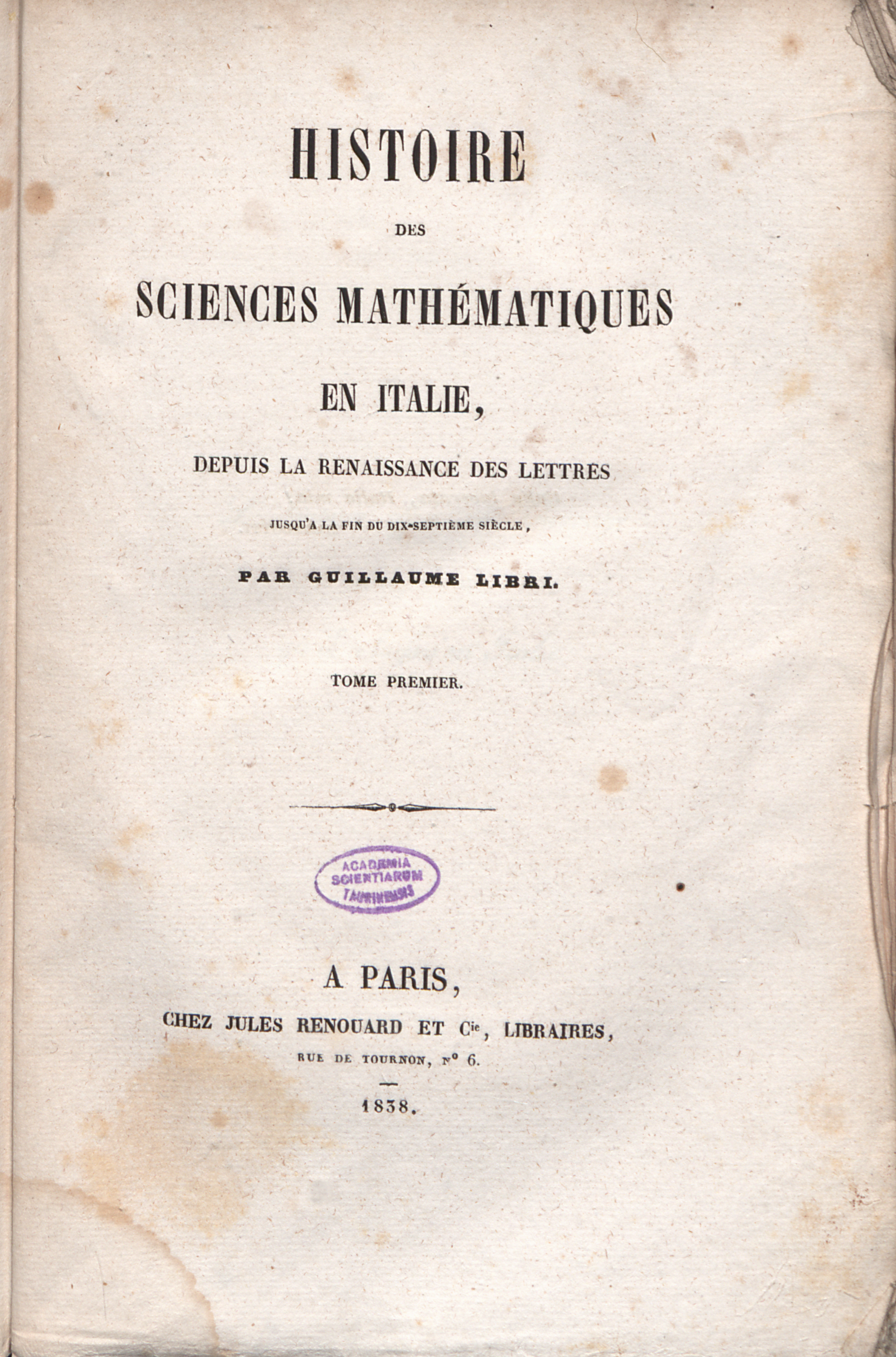
Histoire des sciences mathématiques en Italie, 1838

In 1833, he became a French citizen. His friend Arago, the secretary of the Académie des sciences helped him obtain a professorship at the Collège de France in 1833, succeeding the great mathematician Legendre. And in 1834, he was elected as assistant professor of calculus of probabilities at the Sorbonne. He was also elected to the Academy and given the Légion d'honneur.

Although his friendship with Arago helped him obtain some of these prestigious posts, eventually their relationship went sour and by 1835 they had become bitter enemies. Another prominent mathematician with a dim view of Libri was Liouville; the two would attack each other at every opportunity in meetings of the Academy and Liouville expressed his poor opinion of Libri's personality and of his mathematical capacities in his correspondence.

Between 1838 and 1841 Libri wrote and published a four-volume "History of the Mathematical Sciences in Italy from the Renaissance of literature to the 17th Century". His original research was partially based on some 1800 manuscripts and books by Galileo, Fermat, Descartes, Leibniz, and other luminaries which he claimed to have collected throughout his career; in fact, some of these, as it turned out, had been stolen in Florence from the Biblioteca Medicea Laurenziana.

In 1841, Libri obtained an appointment as Chief Inspector of French Libraries through his friendship with the influential French Chief of Police François Guizot. This job, involving in part the cataloguing of valuable books and precious manuscripts allowed Libri to indulge his collecting passion by stealing them. Although suspected, he was not investigated or charged. Abusing his privileges and pretending poor health (coughing, dressed in a big cape in all weathers), he managed to spend time alone in the archives of libraries across the country. There he 'borrowed' items which were never returned.

In 1842, he stole the Ashburnham Pentateuch at the Library of Tours. Thanks to the blind confidence of the canon Hyacinthe Olivier-Vitalis, he seized at the Inguimbertine library of Carpentras numerous documents such as the " Works of Théocrite and Hésiode " (Venice, Alde, 1495) or 72 of 75 letters of Descartes to Father Mersenne (between 1837 and 1847). He did not, occasionally, hesitate to mutilate certain manuscripts: five volumes of the Peiresc fund and at least two thousand leaves so disappeared. In 1848, as France was involved in a liberal revolution and the government fell, a warrant was issued for Libri's arrest.

=== In England ===
However, he received a tip-off and fled to London, shipping 18 large trunks of books and manuscripts, about 30,000 items, before doing so. In London, he was assisted by Antonio Panizzi, the Director of the British Museum Library, and was able to convince many that his problems in France had arisen because he was an Italian, not because the allegations against him had any substance.

On 22 June 1850, he was, however, found guilty of theft by a French Court and sentenced in absentia to 10 years' imprisonment. His friend, the archaeologist and writer Prosper Mérimée (1803–1870), argued in his favour and was prosecuted for this. Mérimée, the author among other stories and plays of "Carmen", had been convinced of Libri's innocence when the Count had told him that the missing French books and manuscripts must have been forgeries since the ones he had were the originals.

Although Libri had arrived in England with nothing but his books and manuscripts, he led a good life and acted the part of society lion. His money came from selling his books. Two large sales held in 1861 reputedly netted him over a million francs; this at a time when the average daily wage for a workman was about four francs.

=== Return to Italy, death and aftermath ===
In 1868, when his health started to deteriorate, Libri returned to Florence and died in Fiesole, Italy on 28 September 1869.

== Fate of the stolen manuscripts ==
Some 2,000 manuscripts which Libri had stolen in Italy and sold in London to Bertram Ashburnham, 4th Earl of Ashburnham were repurchased by the Italian Government in 1884, and are back in the Biblioteca Medicea Laurenziana. In 1888, the 5th Earl of Ashburnham sold a part of the documents stolen in France to the French national library including the Ashburnham Pentateuch.

In June 2010, one of the stolen items, a letter dated 27 May 1641 from Descartes to Marin Mersenne concerning the publication of the former's Meditations on First Philosophy, was discovered in the library of Haverford College in Pennsylvania, United States. The letter had been donated by the widow of a college alumnus in 1902, and was discovered only after a philosopher from Utrecht University in the Netherlands read about it on the Internet, and contacted the college to tell them what they had in their library. The college returned the letter to the Institut de France on 8 June 2010.

== Bibliography ==
- Andrea Del Centina, Alessandra Fiocca, Guglielmo Libri, matematico e storico della matematica. L'irresitibile ascesa dall Ateneo pisano all Institut de France (Firenze, Olschki, 2010).
- P. Allessandra Maccioni Ruju, Marco Mostert, "The Life and Times of Guglielmo Libri (1802-1869). Scientist, patriot, scholar, journalist and thief. A nineteenth-century story". Verloren Publishers, 1995 (ISBN 9065503846).
- Jeremy M. Norman, Scientist, Scholar & Scoundrel: A Bibliographical Investigation of the Life and Exploits of Count Guglielmo Libri, Mathematician, Journalist, Patriot, Historian of Science, Paleographer, Book Collector, Bibliographer, Antiquarian Bookseller, Forger and Book Thief. New York: The Grolier Club, 2013. (ISBN 9781605830414)
