= George Ashburnham, Viscount St Asaph =

British politician

Member of Parliament for Weobley
- In office 1812 – 7 June 1813

Member of Parliament for New Romney
- In office 1807–1812

Personal details
- Born: 9 October 1785
- Died: 7 June 1813 (aged 27) London, England
- Parent: George Ashburnham (father)
- Relatives: Bertram Ashburnham (brother); Thomas Thynne (grandfather); John Ashburnham (grandfather); George Thynne (uncle)
- Education: Trinity College, Cambridge

George Ashburnham, Viscount St Asaph (9 October 1785 – 7 June 1813), styled The Honourable George Ashburnham until 1812, was a British politician.

== Background and education ==
Ashburnham was the eldest son of George Ashburnham, 3rd Earl of Ashburnham, and Sophia, daughter of Thomas Thynne, 1st Marquess of Bath. He gained the courtesy title Viscount St Asaph when his father succeeded in the earldom in 1812. He was educated at Trinity College, Cambridge, graduating MA in 1805.

== Political career ==
Ashburnham was returned to Parliament for New Romney in 1807, a seat he held until 1812, and then represented Weobley (succeeding his uncle Lord George Thynne) until his death in 1813.

== Personal life ==
Lord St Asaph died unmarried at Dover Street, London, in June 1813, aged only 27. His half-brother Bertram Ashburnham eventually succeeded in the earldom.

Parliament of the United Kingdom
Preceded by William Windham; John Perring	Member of Parliament for New Romney; 1807–1812; With: The Earl of Clonmell	Succeeded by Sir John Thomas Duckworth; William Mitford
Preceded by Lord George Thynne; Lord Apsley	Member of Parliament for Weobley; 1812–1813; With: William Bathurst	Succeeded by William Bathurst; James Lenox William Naper
