= Thomas Ashburnham, 6th Earl of Ashburnham =

The Right Honourable The Earl of Ashburnham
- Tenure: 1913–1924
- Predecessor: Bertram, 5th Earl of Ashburnham
- Other titles: Viscount St. Asaph; Baron Ashburnham
- Born: 8 April 1855
- Died: 12 May 1924 (aged 69); London
- Buried: Ashburnham Church
- Spouse: Maria Anderson (1903–1924)

Thomas Ashburnham, 6th Earl of Ashburnham (8 April 1855 – 12 May 1924) was a British Army officer and peer, the last Earl of Ashburnham.

== Early life ==
Thomas Ashburnham was the fifth of seven sons born to Bertram Ashburnham, 4th Earl of Ashburnham, by his wife, Lady Catherine Charlotte Baillie. His eldest brother, also named Bertram, succeeded to the title as 5th Earl in 1878.

Ashburnham was educated at Adams Grammar School in Newport, Shropshire, before going up to Trinity College, Cambridge.

== Military career ==
Commissioned into the 7th Queen's Own Hussars, Ashburnham was posted to South Africa as a Lieutenant in 1881. He later saw active service as in the British Expeditionary Force during the Anglo-Egyptian War of 1882 and was promoted to captain. From 1885 to 1886 he served as aide-de-camp to the Earl of Aberdeen while he was Lord Lieutenant of Ireland. After that, he was stationed for several years in British India. Ashburnham retired from the Army as a Captain in 1899.

== Marriage and life in Fredericton ==
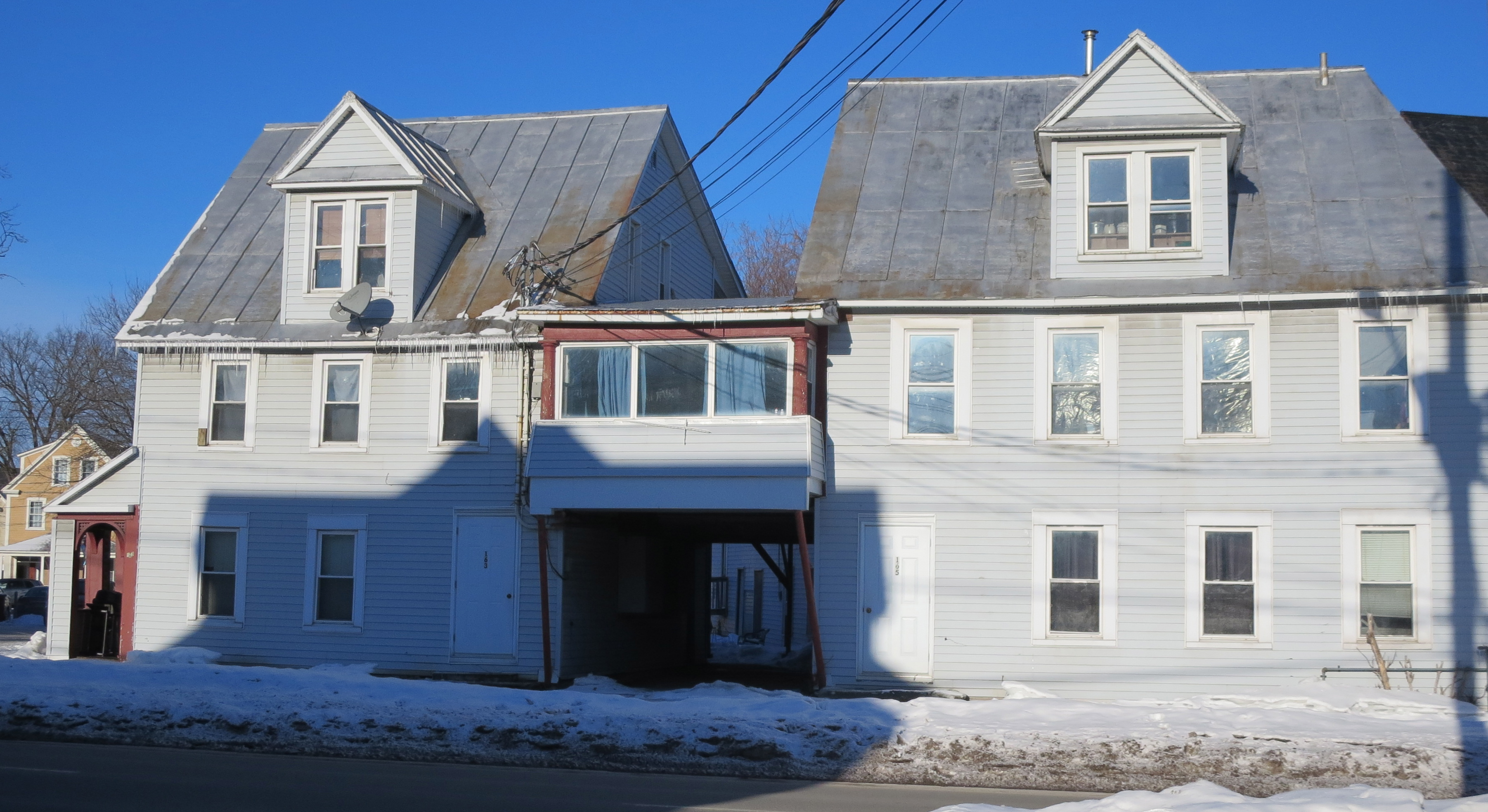
"Ashburnham House", Fredericton, in January 2014

In 1901, aged 45, Thomas Ashburnham went out to Canada, where he stayed in a hotel in Fredericton, New Brunswick. While there, he made several telephone calls from local taverns to a livery stable for a horse and carriage to take him home at the end of the evening, and thus became acquainted with Maria Anderson, the night switchboard operator at the New Brunswick Telephone Company. Infatuated by her pleasant voice and friendly manner, Ashburnham asked to meet her in person, and they got on so well that in early 1903 they were engaged to be married. Their marriage took place on 10 June 1903 at St. Anne's Parish Church, Fredericton. Captain Ashburnham bought two houses on Brunswick Street, Fredericton, one of which had been his wife's family home, and the other an inn, and had them connected by a second floor conservatory over a porte-cochere leading to a garden. The resulting residence was called Ashburnham House. The couple, who lived comfortably on a large allowance from the Ashburnham family, had no children.

== Earl of Ashburnham ==
The 5th Earl of Ashburnham died in Paris on 15 January 1913, without a son and having outlived all his younger brothers except Thomas, who accordingly succeeded to the peerages of Earl of Ashburnham and Viscount St. Asaph, with a seat in the House of Lords, and to his family's settled estates. These included Ashburnham Place in Sussex and extensive estates in Wales. The new peer very soon left for England to settle his brother's affairs and take up his new responsibilities. He returned to Canada in the spring, leaving again with his wife, now Lady Ashburnham, on 15 May 1913. They took up residence at Ashburnham Place, but remained in England for only thirteen months before returning to Fredericton in June 1914. They took with them several English servants, as well as family furnishings and heirlooms, for their Fredericton residence. Lord and Lady Ashburnham continued to live at Ashburnham House in Fredericton for the next ten years, during which they were leaders of the town's social life and generous patrons of charitable causes.

On 26 April 1924, Lord and Lady Ashburnham left Fredericton, taking passage on the SS Regina to make a six-month visit to England. However, during the trans-Atlantic journey Ashburnham became ill with a cold and developed bronchial pneumonia. He died on 12 May 1924 in London and was buried in the family vault at the parish church of Ashburnham. As he had no male heir, his peerages became extinct.

In his will, Lady Ashburnham was left a life annuity of £2,300, and Ashburnham House in Fredericton. She lived until 9 October 1938. The Ashburnham properties in Great Britain, including Ashburnham Place, were inherited by the 5th Earl's daughter, Lady Catherine Ashburnham.

Peerage of Great Britain
Preceded by Bertram Ashburnham	Earl of Ashburnham; 1913–1924	Extinct
