= Ashburnham House =

House in Westminster, London, England

Coordinates: 51°29′55″N 0°7′42″W

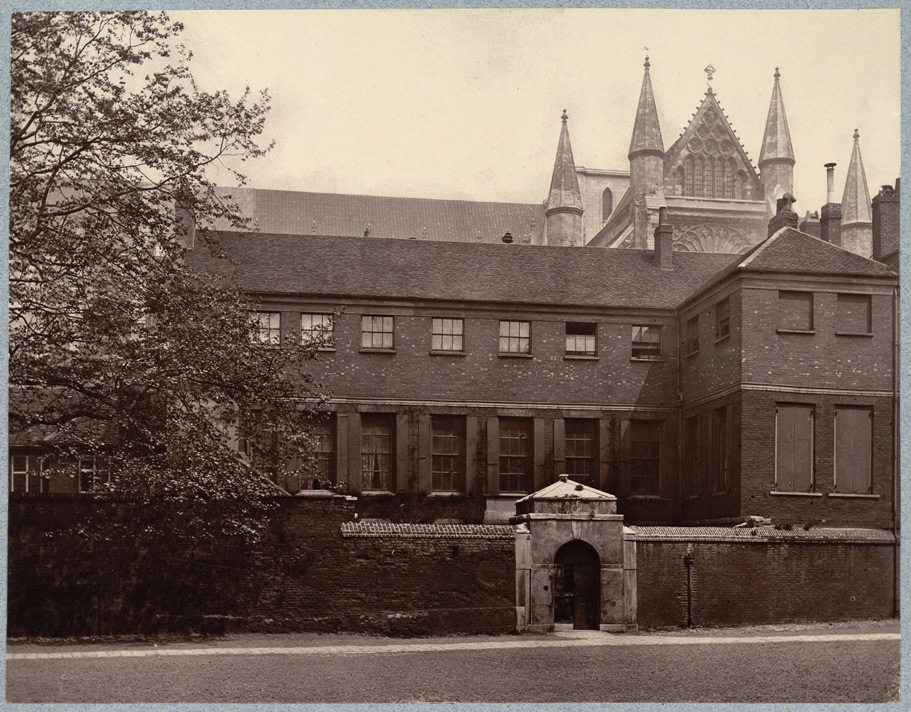
View of Ashburnham House, 1880

Ashburnham House is an extended seventeenth-century house on Little Dean's Yard in Westminster, London, United Kingdom, which since 1882 has been part of Westminster School. It is occasionally open to the public, when its staircase and first floor drawing-rooms in particular can be seen.

Ashburnham House took its present form shortly after the Restoration when it was leased by Charles Ashburnham, a friend of Charles II. and subsequently became a London seat for his family that became the Earls of Ashburnham. As the staircase has the characteristics of work by Inigo Jones or his pupil John Webb the design of the house was for many years attributed to them, but now, however, the house as a whole is often attributed to architect William Samwell. The Ashburnham family lived in the house for less than eighty years until John Ashburnham, 1st Earl of Ashburnham sold the lease to the Crown in 1730.

== Medieval foundations ==
There has been a building on the site since the eleventh century. The current house incorporates the remains of the mediaeval Prior's House, and its garden is the site of the monks' refectory and some of the earliest sittings of the House of Commons, such as when they met in the refectory to impeach Piers Gaveston in the time of Edward II. The masonry embrasures in the front room on the ground floor expose the house's mediaeval origins from before the sixteenth-century dissolution of the Monastery, and perhaps from before the Conquest.

== Cotton Library and Ashburnham House fire ==
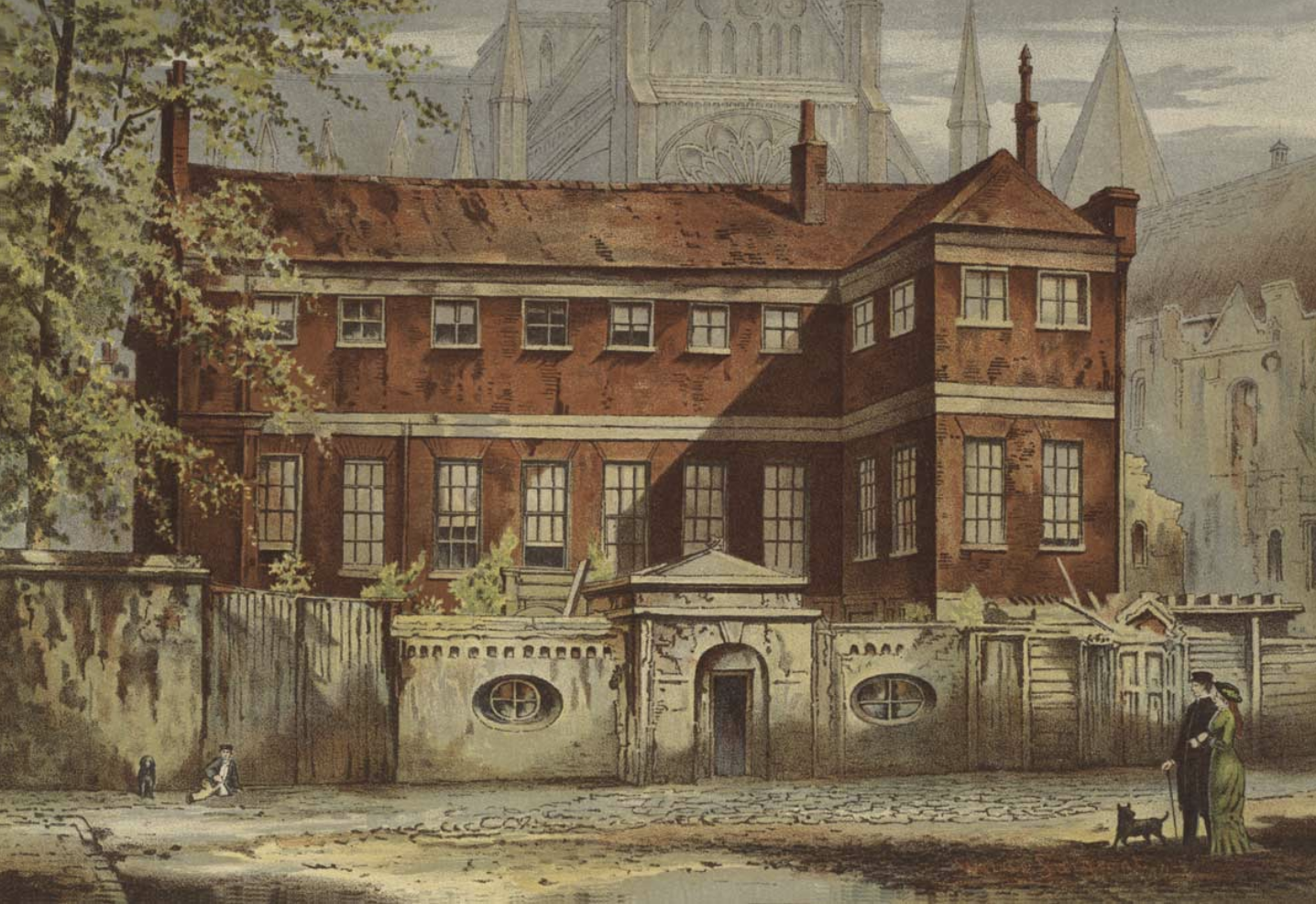
Ashburnham House by Waldo Sargeant in 1900

Ashburnham House became the repository for the Cotton library of historic legal and constitutional manuscripts originally assembled by Sir Robert Cotton), to which was later added the Old Royal Library; and also a residence for the Keeper of the King's Libraries, Dr Richard Bentley. These books and manuscripts now form the heart of the collections of the British Library. A fire in Ashburnham House on 23 October 1731 damaged many items: a contemporary records Dr Bentley leaping from a window with the priceless Codex Alexandrinus under one arm. One manuscript of the Anglo-Saxon Chronicle was virtually destroyed. The manuscript of Beowulf was among those that suffered damage, a fact reported in The Gentleman's Magazine.

== Westminster School ==
In 1739 the Dean and Chapter bought back the property from the Crown for £500, and it reverted to the use of the prior's direct equivalent, the sub-dean.

The house was the object of a scandalous legal and parliamentary battle between the canons of Westminster Abbey and Westminster School for twenty years after the Clarendon Commission recommended that Westminster Abbey surrender it to the school upon the demise of its current occupant, the redoubtable sub-dean the Reverend Lord John Thynne, who lived there with his equally formidable wife and nine children. The Dean and Chapter attempted to evade their obligations under the Public Schools Act, by purportedly using their control of the school's governing body to sell out the school's statutory right for the benefit of the Canons. Even after this was defeated by a debate in Parliament, Lord John survived until 1881, once surprising the headmaster who was looking over his garden wall from a ladder, by leaning out of a window with the words "Not dead yet, Dr. Gow!"

The house was the original location of Westminster's first day-house, also known as Ashburnham House, from when it was founded until it moved in 1951 to 6 Dean's Yard. The day-boys continued to lunch there until the 1970s, and the mediaeval ground floor is now primarily used for catering and social functions, while the seventeenth-century first floor drawing rooms, now extending right through into the former John Sergeant ante-room to School, form a superb library suite.

== Second World War ==
During the Second World War, the library was used as a communications station for the Royal Air Force and a senior conference facility for secret military purposes, disguised by the use of the ground floor as "The Churchill Club" for senior American officers.

== See also ==
- Ashburnham Place

== Bibliography ==
- Stourton, James (2012). Great Houses of London (Hardback). London: Frances Lincoln. ISBN 978-0-7112-3366-9.
