= George Ashburnham, 3rd Earl of Ashburnham =

British peer

The Right Honourable The Earl of Ashburnham KG GCH FSA
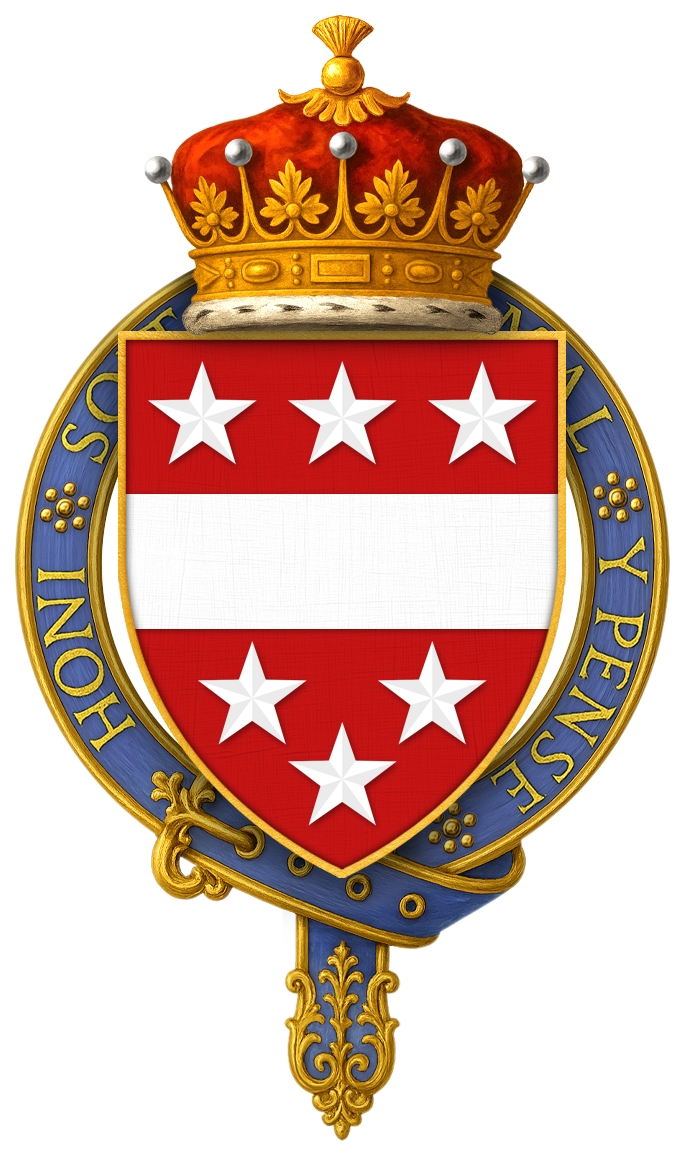
- Garter-encircled arms of George Ashburnham, 3rd Earl of Ashburnham

Member of the House of Lords
- Lord Temporal
- In office 1804 – 27 October 1830
- Preceded by: Summoned by writ of acceleration
- Succeeded by: The 4th Earl of Ashburnham

Personal details
- Born: George Ashburnham, Viscount St Asaph; 25 December 1760
- Died: 27 October 1830 (aged 69)
- Spouses: Sophia Thynne (m. 1784; died 1791) Lady Charlotte Percy (m. 1795; died 1830)
- Children: George Ashburnham, Viscount St Asaph; Bertram Ashburnham, 4th Earl of Ashburnham; Thomas Ashburnham
- Parent: 2nd Earl of Ashburnham (father)

George Ashburnham, 3rd Earl of Ashburnham (25 December 1760 – 27 October 1830), was a British peer.

== Early life ==
He was the son of the 2nd Earl of Ashburnham and the former Elizabeth Crowley, being styled Viscount St Asaph from birth, and was baptised on 29 January 1761 at St George's, Hanover Square, London, with King George III, the Duke of Newcastle and the Dowager Princess of Wales as his godparents.

In 1780, Lord St Asaph graduated from Trinity College, Cambridge, with a Master of Arts degree.

== Career ==
Lord St Asaph was summoned to the House of Lords by writ of acceleration as 5th Baron Ashburnham in 1804. He held the office of Trustee of the British Museum between 1810 and 1830. In 1812 he succeeded his father as 3rd Earl of Ashburnham.

His main family home was at Ashburnham Place in Sussex, which belonged to the family from the late 11th century until 1953. The Ashburnham archive is held by the East Sussex Record Office.

== Personal life ==
He married, firstly, Sophia Thynne (19 December 1763 – 9 April 1791), daughter of the 3rd Viscount Weymouth (later the 1st Marquess of Bath), on 28 August 1784. They had four children:

- George Ashburnham, Viscount St Asaph (8 October 1785 – 7 June 1813)
- Lady Elizabeth Sophia Ashburnham (16 September 1786 – 13 March 1879)
- Sophia Ashburnham (29 January 1788 – 17 June 1807)
- Ensign John Ashburnham (3 June 1789 – 1810) (served in the Coldstream Guards in the Napoleonic Wars; drowned whilst returning from Portugal)

He married, secondly, Lady Charlotte Percy (3 June 1776 – 26 November 1862) on 25 July 1795. She was a daughter of the 1st Earl of Beverley, and a sister of George Percy, 5th Duke of Northumberland. They had 13 children:

- William Ashburnham (19 January 1797 – 1797) (died an infant)
- Bertram Ashburnham, 4th Earl of Ashburnham (23 November 1797 – 22 June 1878)
- Percy Ashburnham (22 November 1799 – 25 January 1881)
- Lady Charlotte Susan Ashburnham (23 February 1801 – 26 April 1865)
- Lady Theodosia Julia Ashburnham (27 March 1802 – 22 August 1887)
- Charles Ashburnham (23 March 1803 – 22 December 1848)
- Lady Georgiana Jemima Ashburnham (11 May 1805 – May 1882) (mother of Lord Redesdale)
- Lady Jane Henrietta Ashburnham (19 July 1809 – 26 November 1896) (mother of the poet Swinburne)
- Lady Katherine Frances Ashburnham (31 March 1812 – 6 April 1839)
- Lady Eleanor Isabel Bridget Ashburnham (28 July 1814 – 6 March 1895)
- General Thomas Ashburnham, CB (1816 – 2 March 1872)
- Lady Mary Agnes Blanche Ashburnham (23 January 1816 – 22 April 1899)
- Reginald Ashburnham (1819 – 5 March 1830)

On his death he was succeeded by his fourth (but eldest surviving) son, Bertram, Viscount St. Asaph.

Court offices
Preceded by The Earl of Courtown	Gentleman of the Bedchamber to The Prince of Wales; 1784–1795	Succeeded by ?
Peerage of Great Britain
Preceded by John Ashburnham	Earl of Ashburnham; 1812–1830	Succeeded by Bertram Ashburnham
Peerage of England
Preceded by John Ashburnham	Baron Ashburnham (by writ of acceleration); 1804–1830; Member of the House of Lords (1804–1830)	Succeeded by Bertram Ashburnham
