= Ashburnham Pentateuch =

Latin illuminated manuscript of the Pentateuch

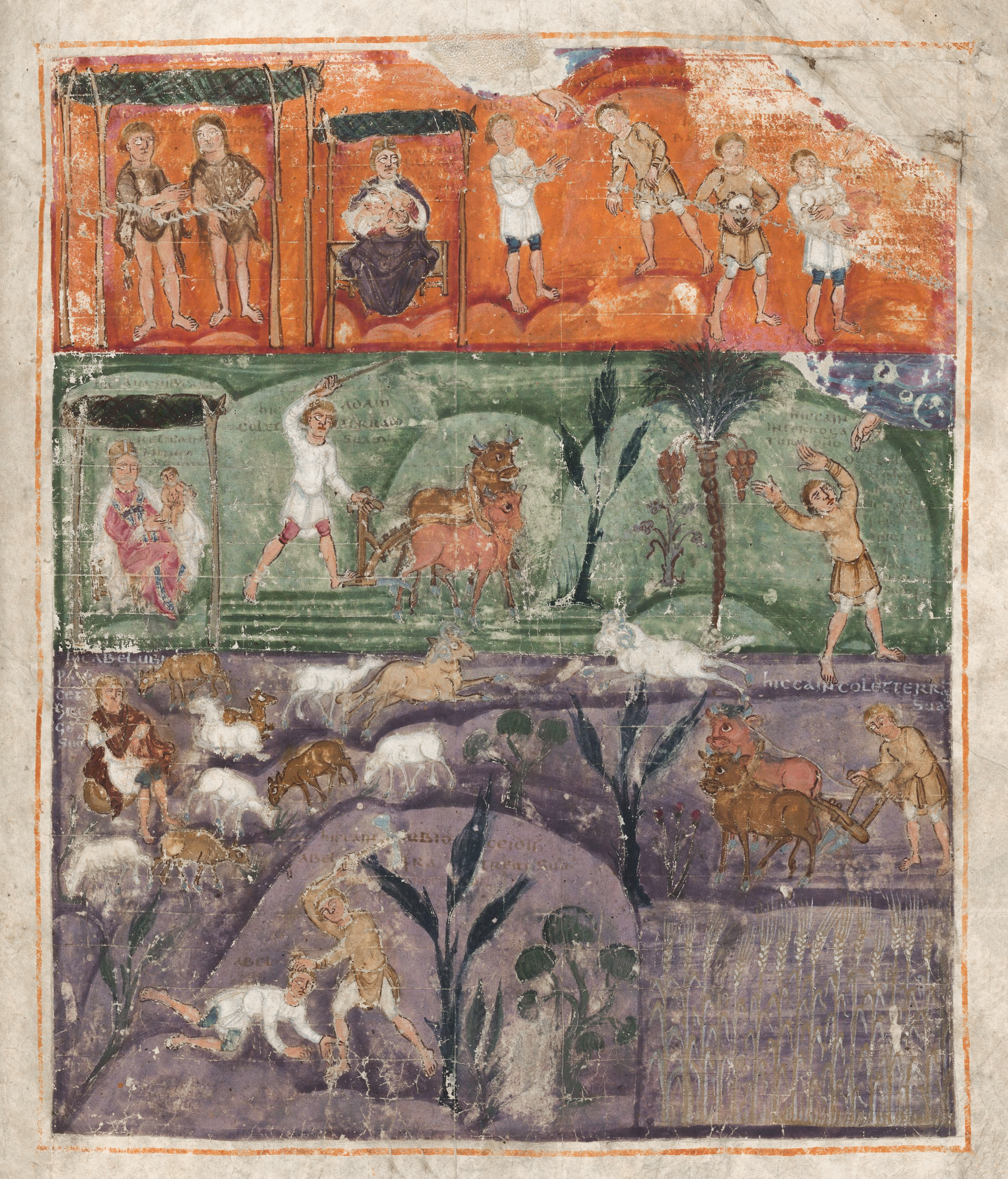
Ashburnham Pentateuch, Paris, Bibliothèque Nationale de France, Ms. Nouv. Acq. Lat. 2334, fol. 6r. This splendid miniature represents the story of Cain and Abel, but at the heading of the miniatures we can see Adam and Eve dressed with some animal skins, and the next scene is Eve breastfeeding one of their sons.

The Ashburnham Pentateuch (Paris, Bibliothèque Nationale de France, MS nouv. acq. lat. 2334, also known as the Tours Pentateuch and the Codex Turonensis) is a late 6th- or early 7th-century Latin illuminated manuscript of the Pentateuch (the first five books of the Old Testament). Although it originally contained all five books of the Pentateuch, it is now missing the whole of Deuteronomy as well as sections of the other five books.

It has 142 folios and 19 miniatures, and measures 372mm by 321mm. It is thought to have originally included as many as 68 full page miniatures. A full page table containing the Latin names of the books and Latin transliterations of the Hebrew names serves as a frontispiece to the Genesis. The table is enclosed within a curtained arch. Some of the full page miniatures, such as that containing the miniature of Noah's Ark (folio 9r), contain a single scene. Other full page miniatures, such as that telling the story of Cain and Abel, contain many scenes which are placed in a register, with each scene having a different color background.

The origin of this manuscript is uncertain. Although it has been described by some scholars as Spanish, it may have come from North Africa, Syria or Italy.

The miniatures were used as the source of a later cycle of wall-paintings at the church of St Julian in Tours. The manuscript was at the Library of Tours before being stolen in 1842 by Guglielmo Libri Carucci dalla Sommaja and sold to Bertram Ashburnham, 4th Earl of Ashburnham in 1847. Since 1888, it has been housed at the National Library of France in Paris after it was sold back to France by Bertram Ashburnham, 5th Earl of Ashburnham.

It is richly decorated with 18 full-page miniatures (remains of the original 69) illustrating scenes from the Genesis and Exodus biblical books. Its production has been assigned on stylistic base to Spain, Northern Africa or Italy. The miniatures of the Pentateuch have been analysed in non-invasive way in order to characterise its palette and to compare it with those of other early medieval manuscripts. The results of this investigation highlighted the wide use of the pigment Egyptian blue, an unusual feature in miniature painting.
