= Penhurst =

Village in East Sussex, England

Coordinates: 50.9247°N 0.4096°E

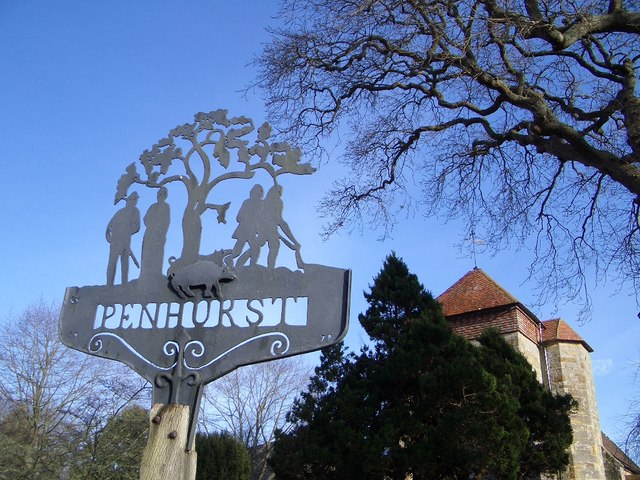

- Location within East Sussex
- Area: 5.89 km^{2} (2.27 sq mi)
- Population: 52 (2001 Census)
  - Density: 9/km^{2} (23/sq mi)
- OS grid reference: TQ867120
- Civil parish: Penhurst
- District: Rother
- Shire county: East Sussex
- Region: South East
- Country: England
- Sovereign state: United Kingdom
- Post town: BATTLE
- Postcode district: TN33
- Dialling code: 01424
- Police: Sussex
- Fire: East Sussex
- Ambulance: South East Coast
- Website: ashburnham-penhurst.net/parish-council/

Penhurst is a village and civil parish in the Rother district of East Sussex, England. It is located on the Weald, 4 miles (7km) west of Battle. The parish borders Ashburnham, Battle, Brightling and Catsfield, and shares a parish council with Ashburnham.

The parish has few residents, according to the 2001 census Penhurst has just 52 inhabitants, but contains many listed buildings.

== History ==
The name "Penhurst" means 'Pena's wooded hill'. Penhurst was recorded in the Domesday Book as Penehest. In 1086, Penhurst was in the hundred of Hailesaltede; the Abbey of Battle was its tenant-in-chief. The two parishes, neither of which has many dwellings, were originally united in 1810.

== Geography ==
Penhurst is in the High Weald National Landscape (formerly High Weald Area of Outstanding Natural Beauty) and more specifically within the South Slopes of the High Weald Landscape Character Area. The parish is undulating and a significant area is woodland including Creep Wood by the Ash Bourne stream, Peens Wood, Allfrees Wood, Foxearth Wood and Link Wood.

An Ordnance Survey benchmark in the village gives a height above ordnance datum of 63.386 metres (208 feet).

== Landmarks ==
There are 14 listed buildings in Penhurst, including a large 18th century barn, a granary constructed in 1776 and Penhurst Manor, (listed as Church Farmhouse) and now a Christian retreat centre used much in the support of missionaries from overseas.

The 14th century parish church, dedicated to St Michael the Archangel is Grade I listed.

The actor Harry H Corbett (1925-1982) famous for his role in the 1960s and 70s comedy, Steptoe and Son lies buried in St Michael's churchyard.

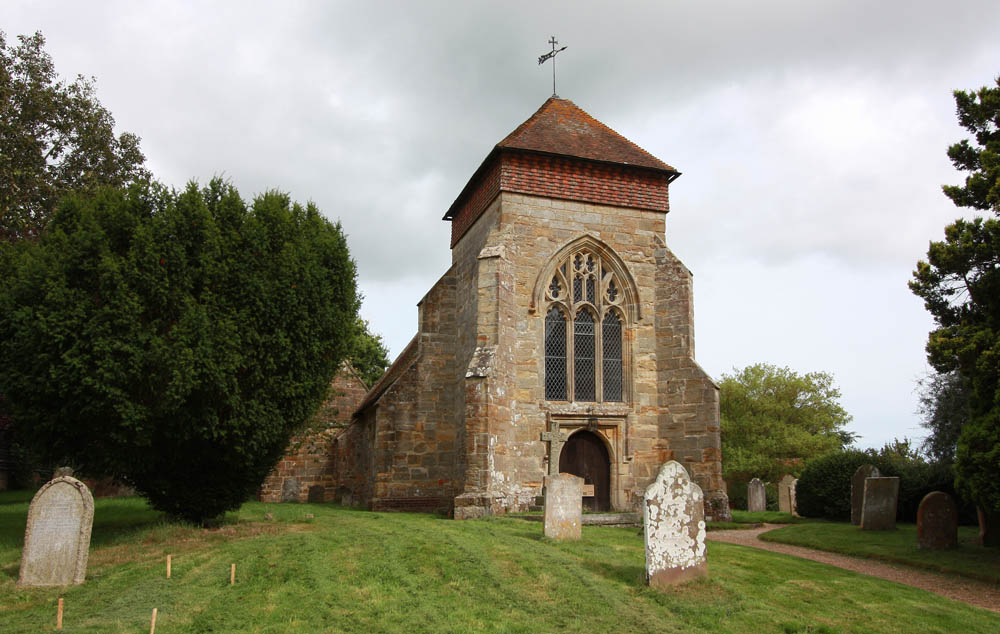
St Michael the Archangel Church

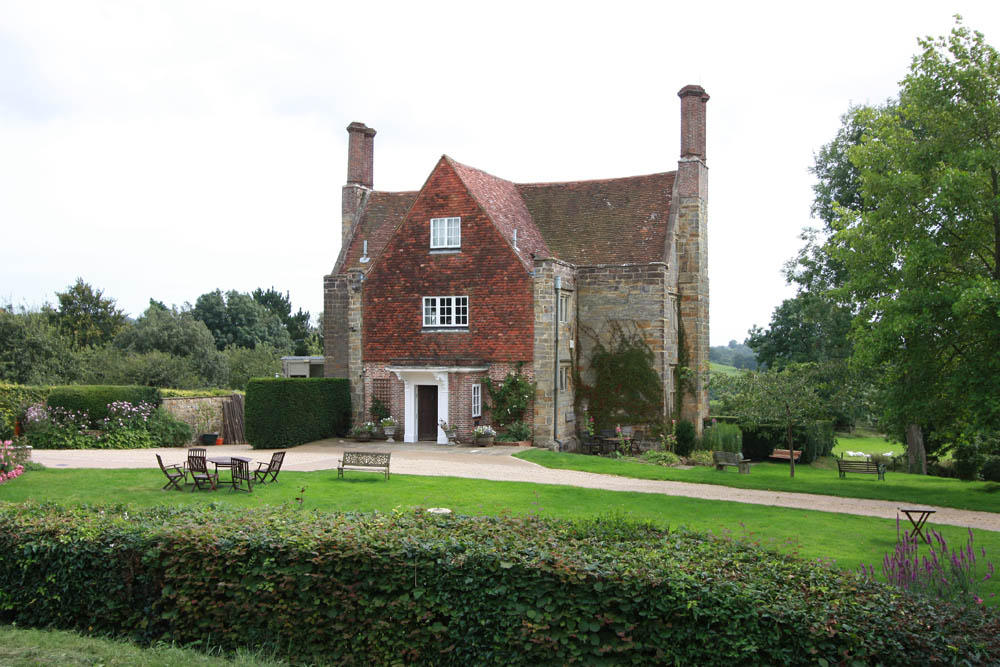
Penhurst Manor

== Governance ==
At a local level, Penhurst and neighbouring Ashburnham have been governed by a joint parish council, The Parish Council of Ashburnham with Penhurst, since a Grouping Order was made in 1954. The parish council is made up of seven councillors, split into two wards: five councillors from Ashburnham ward and two from Penhurst ward. At the May 2019 election the Penhurst ward was uncontested. Since then two councillors have been co-opted to the Penhurst ward's two vacancies.

Rother District Council provides the next level of government. Ashburnham and Penhurst are within the Catsfield & Crowhurst ward. In the May 2023 election the ward was won by the Liberal Democrat candidate, who defeated the incumbent Conservative councillor.

East Sussex County Council is the top tier of local government. Ashburnham with Penhurst falls within the Battle and Crowhurst ward. The Liberal Democrat candidate was elected at the May 2021 election.

The UK Parliament constituency for Ashburnham and Penhurst is Bexhill and Battle.

Prior to Brexit in 2020, the villages were part of the South East England constituency in the European Parliament.
