= Ashburnham Place =

Country house in East Sussex, England

Coordinates: 50°54′19″N 0°24′5.3″E

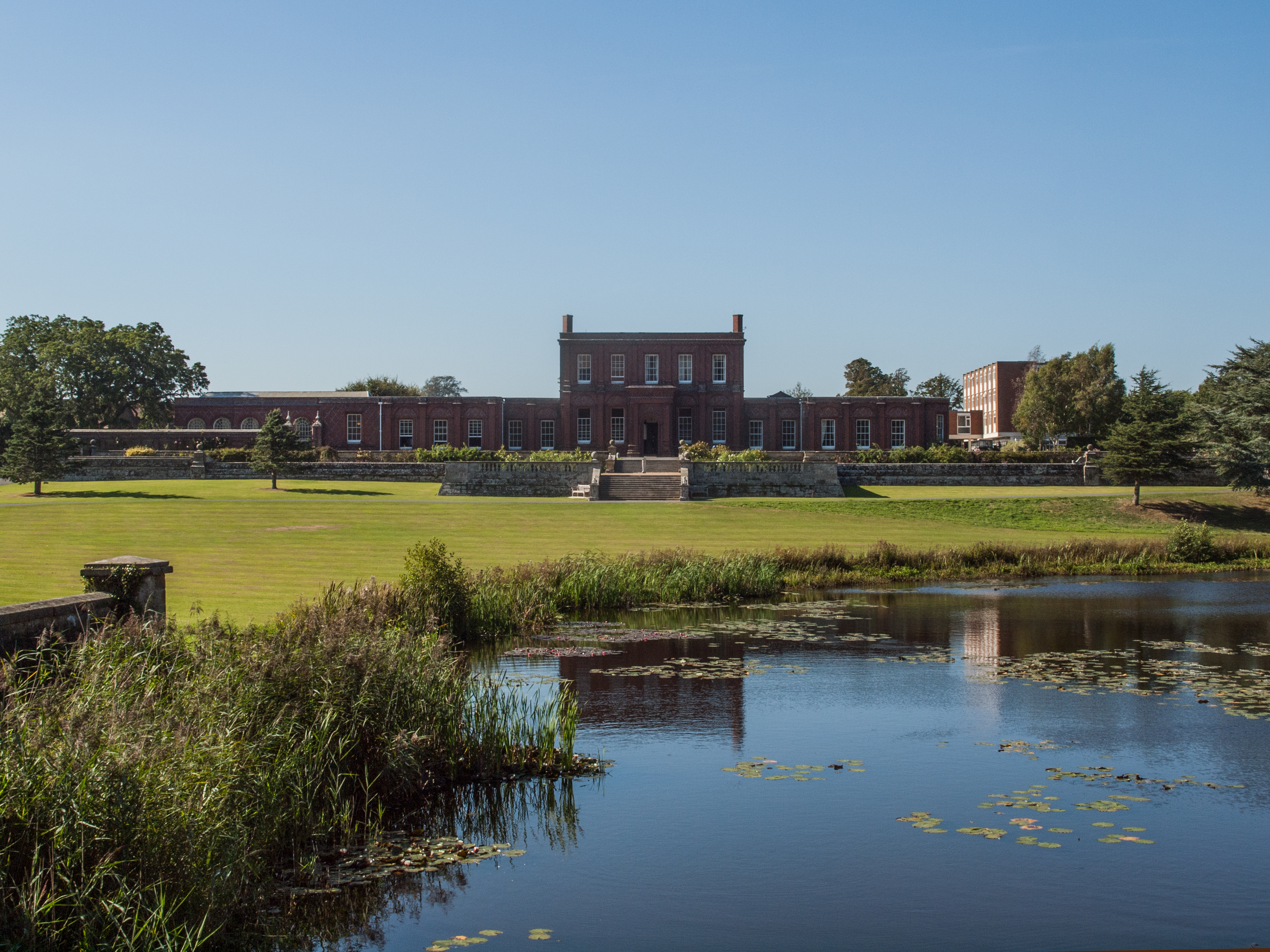
Ashburnham Place viewed across Front Water Lake in 2015.

Ashburnham Place is an English country house, now used as a Christian conference and prayer centre, five miles west of Battle, East Sussex. It was one of the finest houses in the southeast of England in its heyday, but much of the structure was demolished in 1959, and only a drastically reduced part of the building now remains standing.

== Early history ==
The village of Ashburnham was the home of the Ashburnham family from the 12th century. The family became wealthy through their land holdings in Sussex and around Pembrey in Carmarthenshire, and later from their participation in the Wealden iron industry. Only the cellars remain from the earliest known house on the site, dating from the 15th century. This house was abandoned in the 16th century and confiscated by Queen Elizabeth I. The Ashburnham family recovered their estate under Charles I, and John Ashburnham was a loyal servant of the King. He was forced to sell the estate to the Relf family in the English Commonwealth, to pay fines levied for supporting the King. John Ashburnham recovered the estate again after the English Restoration. His grandson and namesake, John Ashburnham, was created first Baron Ashburnham in 1689. The house was largely rebuilt to designs of the neo-Palladian architect Stephen Wright and the local direction of the builder John Morris of Lewes, ca 1757–61.

== Design ==
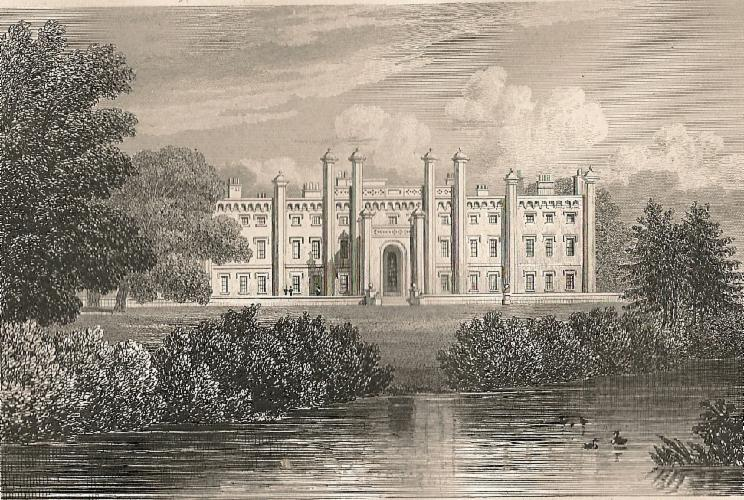
A drawing by John Preston Neale of Ashburnham Place in 1828 showing the lake in front

The park, covering some 200 acres (0.81 km^{2}) and including three large lakes around the house, was laid out by the landscape architect Capability Brown in the mid-18th century. Brown's orangery, c. 1767, houses the oldest camellia in England. Brick external additions were made to the house in Gothic Revival style in 1813–17, by a third John Ashburnham, the second earl of Ashburnham, to designs by George Dance the Younger. Robert Adam designed entrance lodges for the second Earl in 1785. George Ashburnham, 3rd Earl of Ashburnham, commissioned architectural drawings from John Soane, but it is not known if the suggested additions, including a porte-cochere, were built. The house was refaced in stone in the early 19th century, and then, when fashions changed, a second, red brick outer skin was added in 1853.

Internally, the house had a mix of styles, with a fine staircase by George Dance rising three floors in the central entrance hall. The drawing room was decorated with painted wall panels attributed to Athenian Stuart. The house held the family's fine collection of paintings and the extensive library, collected by the 3rd Earl and his son, Bertram Ashburnham, 4th Earl of Ashburnham.

The gardens of Ashburnham Place are Grade II* listed on the Register of Historic Parks and Gardens.

== Later history ==
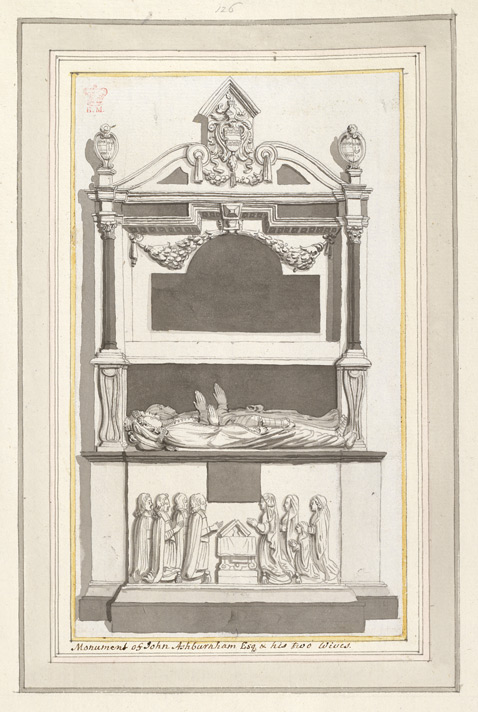
Monument to John Ashburnham and his two wives, Church of St Peter, Ashburnham, Sussex

By the late 19th century, the family was under financial pressure, and offered to sell the library, including its collection of illuminated manuscripts, to the nation in the 1890s for £160,000. The deal did not go ahead, and the books were sold piecemeal for a total of £228,000 over the next few years. Many were acquired by the British Library, but, for example, the sixth-to-seventh-century Ashburnham Pentateuch is in the Bibliothèque nationale, Paris. The Earldom became extinct on the death of Thomas Ashburnham, 6th Earl of Ashburnham in 1924, and the house was inherited by his niece, Lady Catherine Ashburnham. The house was damaged when a fully loaded Marauder bomber crashed nearby during the Second World War, and dry rot set in.

Lady Catherine was the last of this line of the Ashburnham family and the estate was inherited by Reverend John David Bickersteth (1926-1991), a great-grandson of the 4th Earl, on her death in 1953. In addition to the prospect of huge repair bills, he was also saddled with crippling death duties of £427,000. The contents of the house were sold at auction at Sotheby's in June and July 1953, and half of the estate was sold in the next few years. The house was mostly demolished in 1959, reducing the central section to two floors and the wings to a single story.

The house is Grade II listed on the National Heritage List for England and they are a Site of Special Scientific Interest.

== Ashburnham today ==
Meanwhile, Bickersteth established a prayer centre in the stable block. He gave the remaining parts of the house, and 220 acres (0.89 km^{2}) of parkland, to the Ashburnham Christian Trust in April 1960. It is operated as a Christian conference and prayer centre.

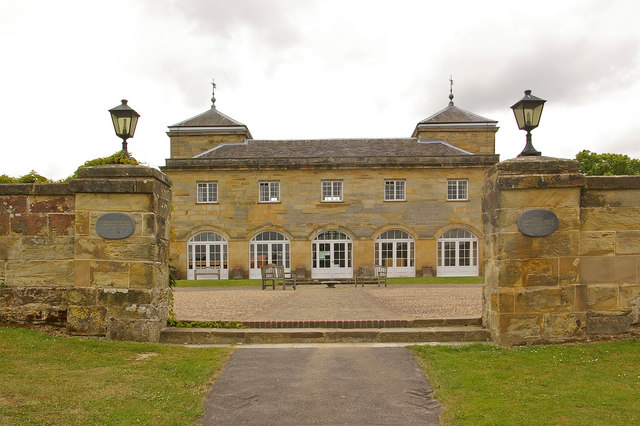
Ashburnham Place, the former Coach House in 2010.

== See also ==
- Ashburnham House
- Earl of Ashburnham
