= Ashburnham Park =

Conservation site in East Sussex, England

Coordinates: 50.907°N 0.412°E

- Site of Special Scientific Interest
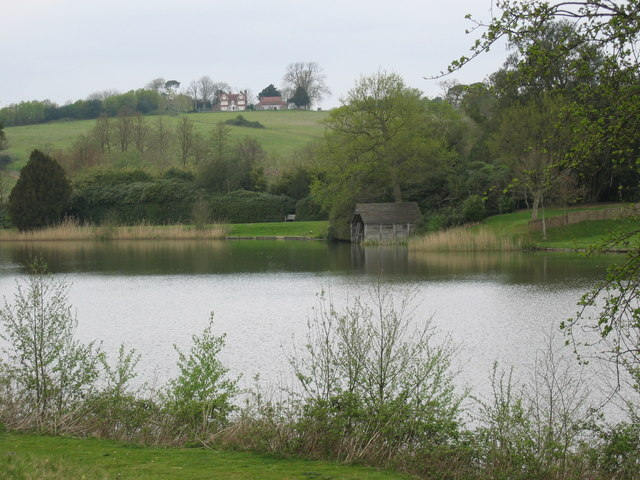
- Location of Ashburnham Park.
- Area of search: East Sussex
- Grid reference: TQ 697 147
- Interest: Biological
- Area: 109.9 hectares (272 acres)
- Notification date: 1986
- Location map: Magic Map

Ashburnham Park is a 109.9-hectare (272-acre) biological Site of Special Scientific Interest north-west of Hastings in East Sussex. It is a Nature Conservation Review site, Grade 2. The park is the garden of Ashburnham Place and it is listed on the Register of Historic Parks and Gardens of Special Historic Interest.

This former medieval deer park has many ancient trees which support more than 160 species of lichens. The habitats are parkland and woodland together with three ornamental lakes. The woods have a diverse selection of breeding bird species.
