= John Ashburnham, 1st Earl of Ashburnham =

British Army officer and politician

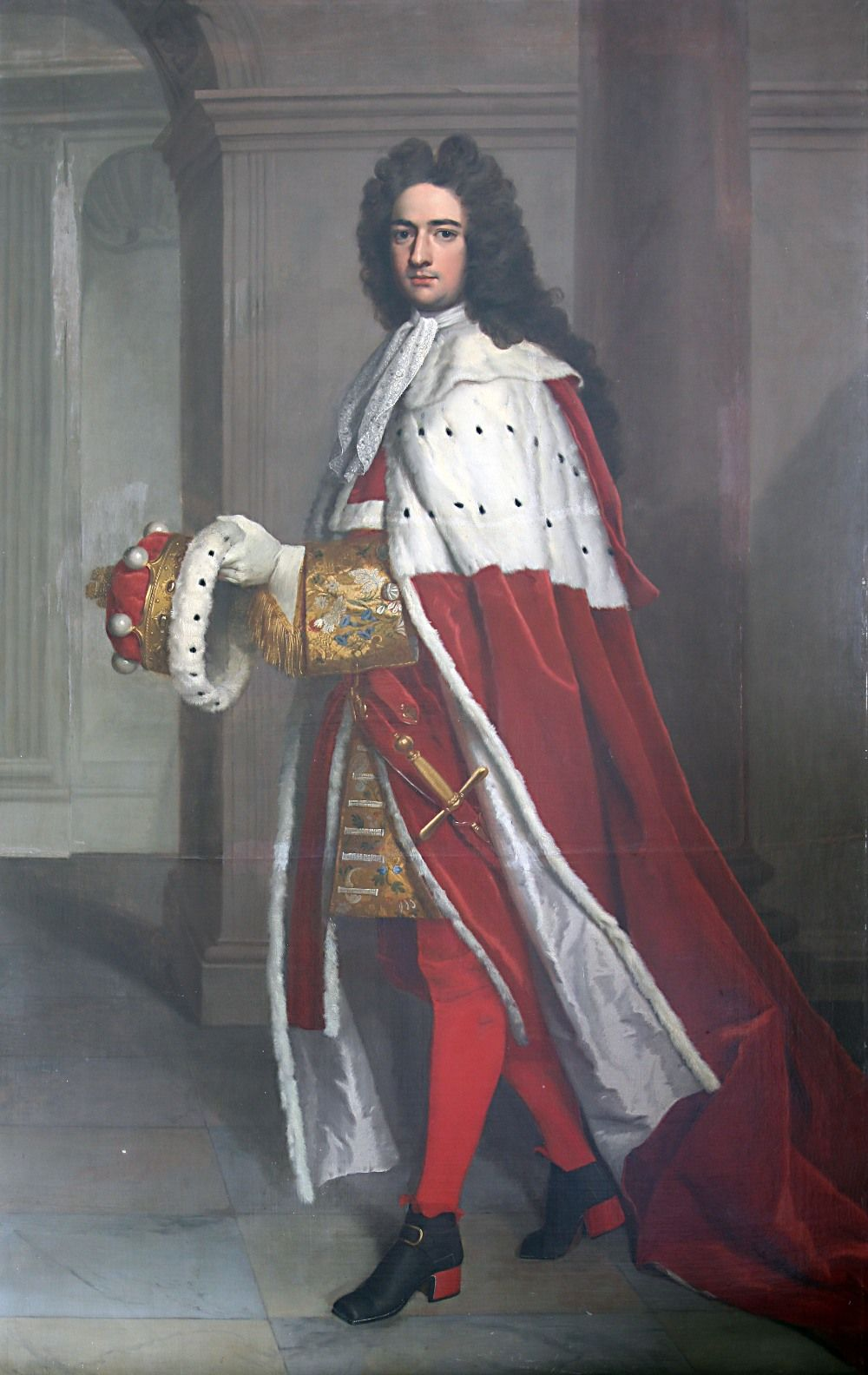
John Ashburnham, 3rd Baron and 1st Earl of Ashburnham

John Ashburnham, 1st Earl of Ashburnham (13 March 1687 – 10 March 1737) was an English peer, soldier and politician.

== Early life ==
Ashburnham was the second son of John Ashburnham, 1st Baron Ashburnham, and his wife, Bridget Vaughan, daughter of Walter Vaughan of Porthamel House, Brecon, South Wales, who had inherited Pembrey. In January 1707, he became a Guidon and major in the 1st Horse Guards through the efforts of his father.

== Career ==
At the 1708 British general election Ashburnham stood for Rye where his father had an interest, but was unsuccessful. After his brother, William, inherited his father's barony of Ashburnham in 1709, he was returned in his place as Tory Member of Parliament for Hastings at a by-election on 10 February 1710. A few months later, his brother died childless, and he himself inherited the peerage. He gave up his seat in the House of Commons which remained vacant until the 1710 British general election. Soon after this he realised that he had to abandon his family's mild pro-Jacobite stance and support the Whigs.

From 1713 to 1715, Ashburnham became Colonel of the 1st (His Majesty's Own) Troop of Horse Guards, and was deputy governor and deputy warden of the Cinque Ports from June 1713 to 1714. He was a Lord of the Bedchamber to Frederick, Prince of Wales from 1728 to 1731 and Captain of the Yeomen of the Guard from 1731 to 1733. On 14 May 1730, he was created Earl of Ashburnham and Viscount St Asaph.

== Family ==
On 21 October 1710, Ashburnham married Lady Mary Butler (died 1713), the second daughter of James Butler, 2nd Duke of Ormonde. After her death, he married, on 25 July 1714, Henrietta, Dowager Countess of Anglesey and 4th Baroness Strange; they had one child, Henrietta (c.1716–1732), later 5th Baroness Strange. After his second wife's death in 1718, Ashburnham married Lady Jemima Grey (died 1731), the second daughter and coheiress of Henry Grey, 1st Duke of Kent on 4 February 1723/4 at St James, Westminster, London. They had one child, John, styled Viscount St Asaph (1724–1812), later 2nd Earl of Ashburnham.

Ashburnham died on 10 March 1737, leaving huge debts, and was buried in the family vault at Ashburnham. He was succeeded as 2nd Earl by his only son, John.

== Notes ==
Parliament of Great Britain
Preceded by John Pulteney; William Ashburnham	Member of Parliament for Hastings; 1710; With: John Pulteney	Succeeded by Sir William Ashburnham, Bt; Joseph Martin
Military offices
Preceded by The Duke of Portland	Captain and Colonel of His Majesty's Own Troop of Horse Guards; 1713–1715	Succeeded by The Duke of Montagu
Political offices
Preceded by The Earl of Leicester	Captain of the Yeomen of the Guard; 1731–1733	Succeeded by The Earl of Tankerville
Honorary titles
Preceded by The Lord Pelham	Vice-Admiral of Sussex; 1712–1715	Succeeded by The Earl of Clare
Peerage of England
Preceded by William Ashburnham	Baron Ashburnham; 1710–1737	Succeeded by John Ashburnham
Peerage of Great Britain
New creation	Earl of Ashburnham; 1730–1737	Succeeded by John Ashburnham
