= Ashburnham, East Sussex =

Parish in East Sussex, England

Coordinates: 50.91°N 0.38°E

Ashburnham
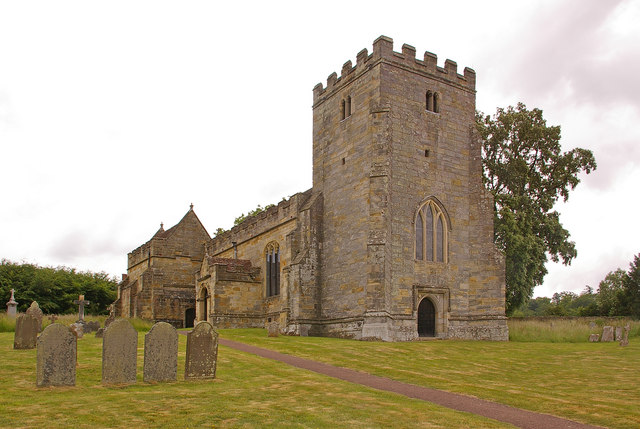
- St Peter's Church, Ashburnham

- Location within East Sussex
- Population: 303 (2001 Census)
  - Density: 43/sq mi (17/km^{2})
- OS grid reference: TQ666179
  - London: 44 miles (71 km) NNW
- Civil parish: Ashburnham
- District: Rother
- Shire county: East Sussex
- Region: South East
- Country: England
- Sovereign state: United Kingdom
- Post town: BATTLE
- Postcode district: TN33
- Dialling code: 01424
- Police: Sussex
- Fire: East Sussex
- Ambulance: South East Coast
- UK Parliament: Bexhill and Battle

Ashburnham is a civil parish in the Rother district of East Sussex, England, situated to the west of Battle. It includes the settlements of Brownbread Street and Ponts Green; Ashburnham Forge is also within the parish. Ashburnham shares a parish council with the neighbouring parish of Penhurst.

Ashburnham takes its name from Ashburnham Place, now a Christian conference and prayer centre, which in turn comes from the fact that the local stream is the Ashbourne. The 14th century parish church, dedicated to St Peter, was rebuilt in 1665. The village was in the iron making district of the Weald, and its blast furnace was the last in Sussex to be closed in 1813.

Ashburnham and neighbouring Penhurst, neither of which have many dwellings, were united in 1810.

The parish has a population of 303 (2001 census).

== Landscape ==
Ashburnham is located in the heart of the Sussex Weald within the designated High Weald Area of Outstanding Natural Beauty.

== Landmarks ==
Ashburnham Park falls within the area and is a Site of Special Scientific Interest. It comprises 100.7 hectares (249 acres) ancient woodland and medieval deer park, containing a wide spread of flora and avian fauna. In 1767 the 2nd Earl of Ashburnham commissioned Lancelot ("Capability") Brown to remodel the park which he did by including three large lakes. Part of the park lies in the neighbouring Catsfield parish.

Several features of the old iron industry can be found along the track from the hamlet of Ashburnham Forge up to the furnace site near Lakehurst Lane. Ashburnham Furnace was in operation from 1549 to 1813. Guns, cast iron pipes, cast iron wheels and ballast for ships were made there in the 18th century. Significant quantities of pig iron were produced from 1785.

== Governance ==
At a local level, Ashburnham and neighbouring Penhurst have been governed by a joint parish council, The Parish Council of Ashburnham with Penhurst, since a Grouping Order was made in 1954. The parish council is made up of seven councillors, split into two wards: five councillors from Ashburnham ward and two from Penhurst ward. The May 2019 election had four candidates standing in the Ashburnham ward who were returned unopposed. The Penhurst ward was uncontested. Since then one councillor was co-opted to fill the remaining vacancy in the Ashburnham ward.

Rother District Council provides the next level of government. Ashburnham and Penhurst are within the Catsfield & Crowhurst ward. In the May 2023 election the ward was won by the Liberal Democrat candidate, who defeated the incumbent Conservative councillor.

East Sussex County Council is the top tier of local government. Ashburnham with Penhurst falls within the Battle and Crowhurst ward. The Liberal Democrat candidate was elected at the May 2021 election.

The UK Parliament constituency for Ashburnham and Penhurst is Bexhill and Battle.

Prior to Brexit in 2020, the villages were part of the South East England constituency in the European Parliament.
