= Bertram Ashburnham, 5th Earl of Ashburnham =

British peer (1840-1913)

- Earl of Ashburnham
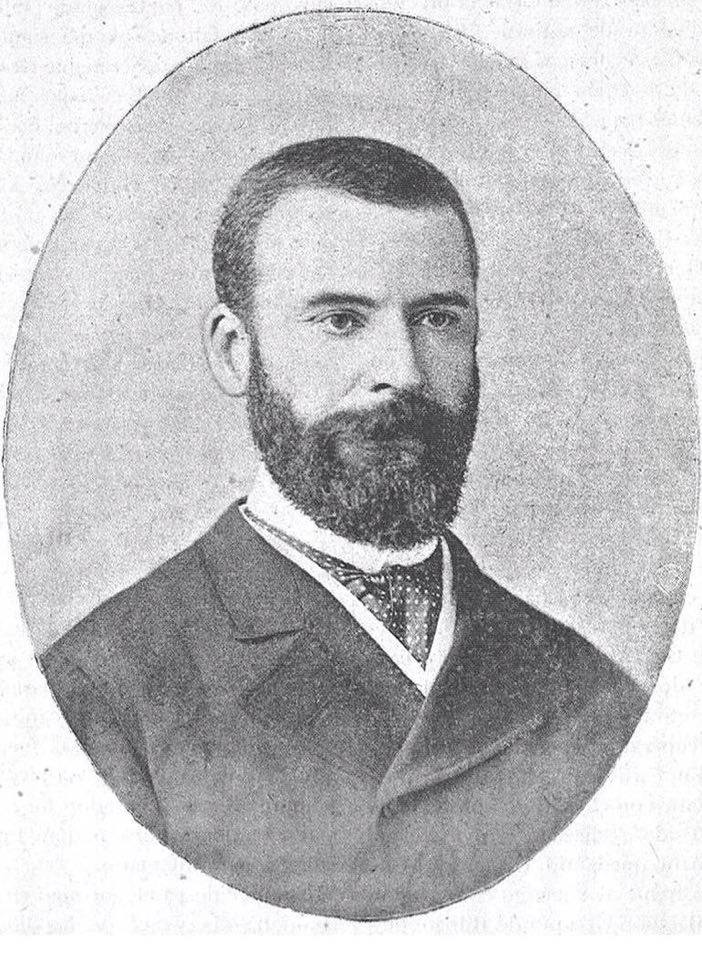
- Tenure: 1878–1913
- Predecessor: Bertram Ashburnham, 4th Earl of Ashburnham
- Successor: Thomas Ashburnham, 6th Earl of Ashburnham
- Other titles: Viscount St. Asaph; Baron Ashburnham
- Born: 28 October 1840
- Died: 15 January 1913 (aged 72); Paris
- Residence: Ashburnham Place
- Spouse: Emily Chaplin (1888–1900)
- Issue: Lady Mary Catherine Charlotte Ashburnham

Bertram Ashburnham, 5th Earl of Ashburnham (28 October 1840 – 15 January 1913) was a British peer. He was the English agent for the Spanish Carlist cause, and a supporter of Irish Home Rule. He sold off the Ashburnham collection of manuscripts which the 4th Earl had collected.

== Early life and family ==
Bertram Ashburnham was born on 26 October 1840, the eldest son of Bertram Ashburnham, 4th Earl of Ashburnham. He was educated at Westminster School and in France. He was a convert to Roman Catholicism, and was formally received into the Church in 1872. On the death of his father in 1878, he became the 5th Earl of Ashburnham, Viscount St. Asaph and Baron Ashburnham, and inherited the family property of about 24,000 acres in England and Wales, including the main family seat of Ashburnham Place in Sussex.

In 1888 he married Emily Chapman, whose father was a tradesman. Their only child, Lady Mary Catherine Charlotte Ashburnham, was born in 1890. His wife died on 12 February 1900. His daughter became a nun, entering the Sacred Heart Convent at Roehampton in 1912.

== Sale of the Ashburnham manuscripts ==
Soon after inheriting his titles and property in 1878, the 5th Earl began negotiations for the sale of his father's collection of manuscripts. The 4th Earl of Ashburnham had been a bibliophile who amassed an important collection of books and manuscripts, most of which were acquired in the 1840s in three separate large purchases. The Stowe collection consisted of almost 1,000 items from the auction of the contents of Stowe House in 1847, and the Libri and Barrois collections, numbering 1923 and 702 respectively, had been purchased in 1848. Another group of 250 manuscripts, called the Appendix, was acquired over the course of the 4th Earl's life.

The sale was complicated by the fact that many of the items in the Libri and Barrois collections had been stolen from French libraries by Count Libri, who then sold them under false pretences to the 4th Earl. Lord Ashburnham originally offered to sell the whole collection to the British Museum for £160,000 in 1879. He refused to consider lowering the price or selling off part of the collection, and the British Museum trustees declined his offer. When he renewed it in 1883, the French government objected on the grounds that between 160 and 170 of the manuscripts, valued at £24,000, had been stolen from French public libraries and therefore belonged to France. Ashburnham denied that any of the manuscripts were stolen, but was obliged to sell the collections separately, starting with the Stowe collection, which the British government purchased for £45,000 in 1883. The other manuscripts were sold off over the following years, with most going to the French and Italian governments and to the collector Henry Yates Thompson. The last of the Barrois collection was finally sold in 1901.

== Political activities ==
The 5th Earl of Ashburnham was a leader of the Carlist cause which aimed to restore the Spanish throne to the descendants of Infante Carlos, Count of Molina. He acted as the British agent and spokesman for the claimant Carlos, Duke of Madrid (known as Don Carlos) and later his son Jaime, Duke of Madrid. He was generally an adherent of Jacobite and Legitimist views, and in 1886 he founded the Order of the White Rose, which became "the main public face of British Legitimism". and started the brief Neo-Jacobite Revival.

Carlist activity increased during the Spanish–American War of 1898 and its aftermath. With the Spanish government weakened by its defeat in the Spanish–American War, the Carlists hoped to depose Alfonso XIII, by force if necessary, and replace him with Don Carlos. Ashburnham gave his opinion that the Spanish Army would not defend the defeated king against the Carlist forces, and that "there will not be a real war, but perhaps a little fighting here and there".

In preparation for the expected hostilities, Ashburnham allowed part of his Welsh estate to be used for military training. Among the recruits who learned to operate a machine gun and rifle and "studied drill, tactics and strategy" was the young Aleister Crowley. Ashburnham bought a yacht, the Firefly, to carry arms and ammunition to the Carlist rebels in Spain in the summer of 1899. It was seized on 17 June at the southern French port of Arcachon carrying a crew of 15 and a cargo of rifles. In early August The Times reported that the vessel had been "allowed to leave on payment of a small deposit" but that the 3,664 rifles it had been carrying had been "detained as security for the fine which may be imposed upon her". Despite Ashburnham's efforts, a Carlist coup d'état did not take place.

Lord Ashburnham was also a supporter of Irish Home Rule. He was a founding member and the first president of the British Home Rule Association, which held its first public meeting in London in 1886, the year of William Ewart Gladstone's unsuccessful First Home Rule Bill. According to his obituary in The Times, the meeting which he chaired was "one of the earliest public meetings ever held in Great Britain to advocate that policy".

== Later life, death and succession ==
After the failure of the Carlist uprising and the death of his wife in 1900, Lord Ashburnham largely withdrew from public life and spent more time at his country properties. Don Jaime, the Carlist pretender to the Spanish throne, was a frequent guest at Ashburnham Place. Lord Ashburnham died in Paris on 15 January 1913. He was succeeded by his youngest and only remaining brother, Thomas, as 6th Earl of Ashburnham, Viscount St. Asaph and Baron Ashburnham.

Peerage of Great Britain
Preceded by Bertram Ashburnham	Earl of Ashburnham; 1878–1913	Succeeded by Thomas Ashburnham
