= John Ashburnham, 2nd Earl of Ashburnham =

British peer and courtier

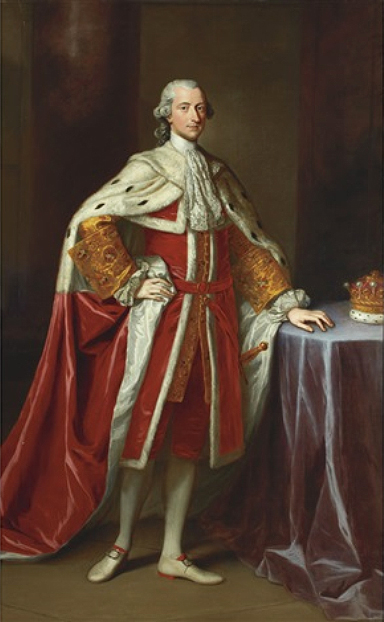
Portrait by William Hoare

John Ashburnham, 2nd Earl of Ashburnham, PC (30 October 1724 – 8 April 1812), styled Viscount St Asaph from 1730 to 1737, was a British peer and courtier.

== Early life ==
Ashburnham was the only son of John Ashburnham, 1st Earl of Ashburnham, by his third wife, Jemima Grey, the daughter of the 1st Duke of Kent, a prominent courtier.

== Career ==
In 1737, he inherited his father's titles and became a Lord of the Bedchamber in 1748.

From 1753 to 1762, Ashburnham was Keeper of Hyde Park and St. James's Park and Lord Lieutenant of Sussex from 1754 to 1757. In 1765, he was appointed Master of the Great Wardrobe, and Groom of the Stole in 1775.

In 1767, he acquired estates in Chelsea from Sir Richard Glyn, and had his residence at Ashburnham House on Lots Lane. He sold the estate to the widowed Lady Mary Coke in 1786.

== Personal life ==
On 25 June 1756, Ashburnham married Elizabeth Crowley (1727–1781), a daughter and co-heiress of Alderman John Crowley, of Barking, Suffolk, a wealthy London merchant, and a son of Sir Ambrose Crowley. Her dowry was £200,000. Elizabeth's mother was Theodosia, daughter of Revd. Joseph Gascoygne. They had six children:

- George, styled Viscount St Asaph (1 February 1758 – 1758).
- Lady Henrietta Theodosia (1759–1847), died unmarried.
- George, styled Viscount St Asaph (1760–1830), later 3rd Earl of Ashburnham.
- Lady Jemima Elizabeth (1762–1786), married James Graham, 3rd Duke of Montrose.
- Lady Elizabeth Frances (1763–1854), died unmarried.
- Lady Theodosia Maria (1765–1822), married Robert Vyner.

Lord Ashburnham died on 8 April 1812 and was succeeded by his son George.

Honorary titles
Vacant Title last held by The Duke of Somerset	Lord Lieutenant of Sussex; 1754 – 1757	Succeeded by The Earl of Abergavenny
Preceded by The Duke of Newcastle	Vice-Admiral of Sussex; 1770 – 1812	Succeeded by The Duke of Richmond
Court offices
Preceded by The Lord le Despencer	Master of the Great Wardrobe; 1765 – 1775	Succeeded by The Lord Pelham of Stanmer
Preceded by The Viscount Weymouth	Groom of the Stole; 1775 – 1782	Succeeded by The Viscount Weymouth
Peerage of Great Britain
Preceded by John Ashburnham	Earl of Ashburnham; 1737 – 1812	Succeeded by George Ashburnham
Preceded by John Ashburnham	Baron Ashburnham (descended by acceleration); 1737 – 1804	Succeeded by George Ashburnham
