= Bertram Ashburnham, 4th Earl of Ashburnham =

British peer

- Earl of Ashburnham
- Tenure: 1830–1878
- Predecessor: George Ashburnham, 3rd Earl of Ashburnham
- Successor: Bertram Ashburnham, 5th Earl of Ashburnham
- Other titles: Viscount St. Asaph; Baron Ashburnham
- Born: 23 November 1797
- Died: 22 June 1878 (aged 80)
- Residence: Ashburnham Place
- Locality: Sussex
- Spouse: Katherine Charlotte Baillie
- Issue: Bertram Ashburnham, 5th Earl of Ashburnham; Thomas Ashburnham, 6th Earl of Ashburnham four other sons and three daughters

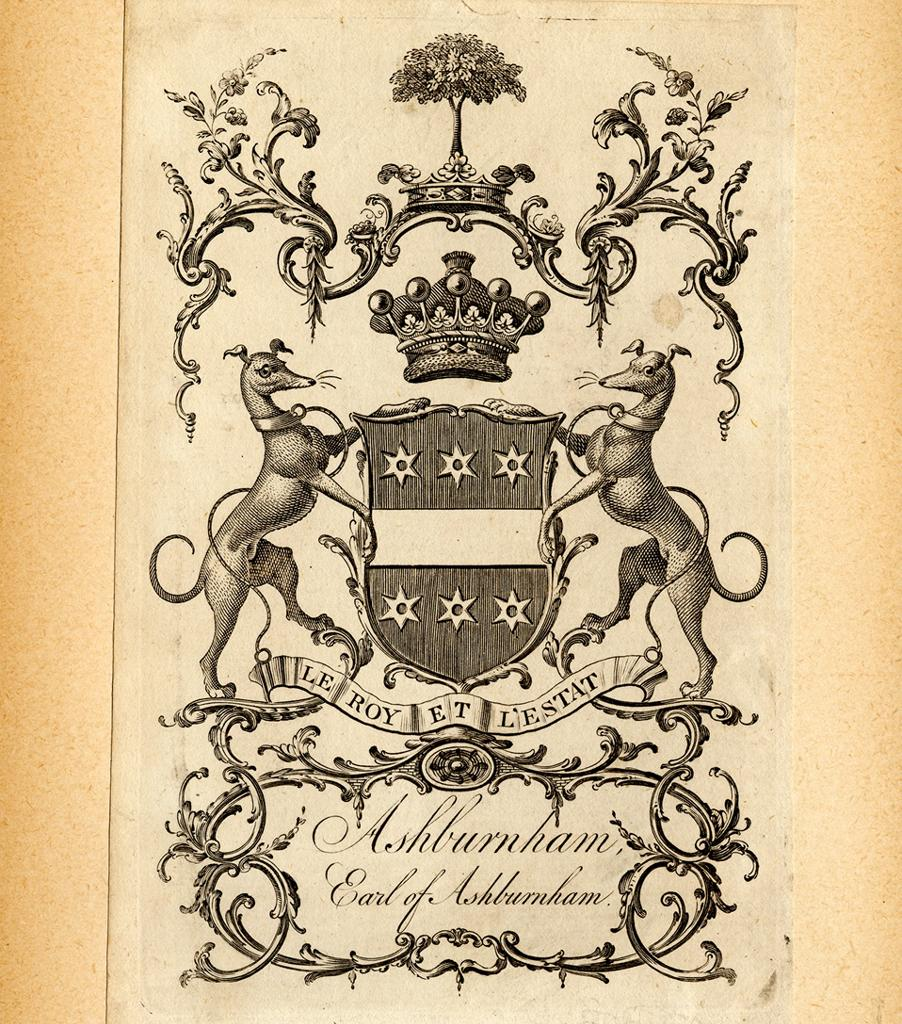
The Ashburnham Library bookplate

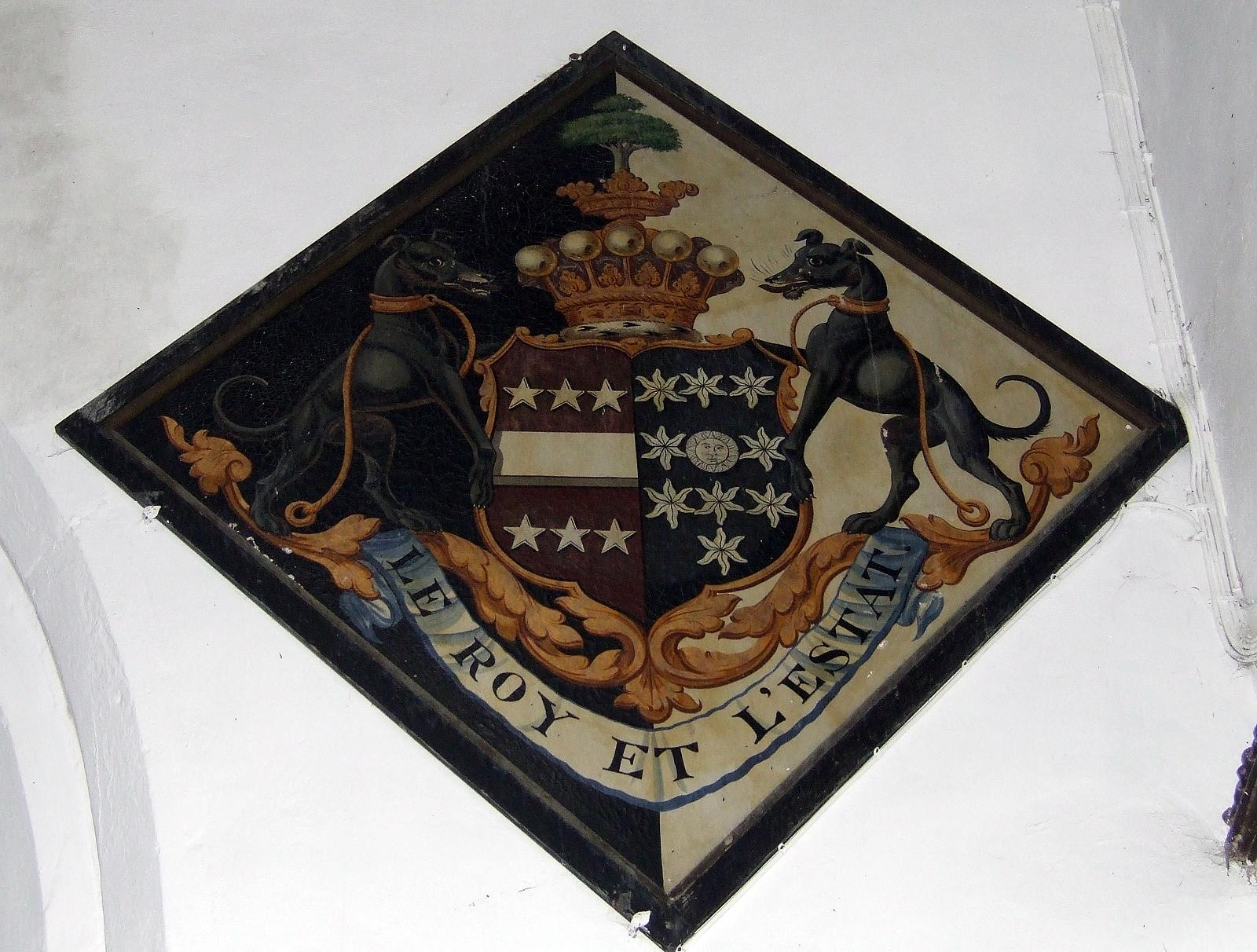
Funeral hatchment of Bertram Ashburnham, 4th Earl of Ashburnham, in St Mary's Church, Barking, Suffolk

Bertram Ashburnham, 4th Earl of Ashburnham (23 November 1797 – 22 June 1878) was a British peer. He was the fourth son of George Ashburnham, 3rd Earl of Ashburnham. As the eldest son still living when his father died in 1830, he succeeded as Earl of Ashburnham, Viscount St. Asaph and Baron of Ashburnham.

He married Katherine Charlotte Baillie, daughter of George Baillie and Mary Pringle, on 8 January 1840 in Earlston, Berwick, Scotland. They had four daughters and seven sons, including:

- Bertram (28 October 1840 – 15 January 1913), the 5th Earl, who succeeded his father in 1878; and
- Thomas (8 April 1855 – 12 May 1924), the 6th Earl, who succeeded his brother in 1913 when the latter died without a son.

== The Ashburnham library ==
The 4th Earl of Ashburnham was a bibliophile who amassed an important collection of printed books and manuscripts and was known as "one of the great collectors of the nineteenth century". His incunabula included two copies of the Gutenberg Bible and approximately thirty volumes that had been printed by William Caxton. Ashburnham's heir, the 5th Earl, sold off the book collection in a series of auctions in 1897 and 1898, realising a total of £62,712 for the 4075 lots sold.

Most of Ashburnham's manuscripts were acquired through three large purchases in the 1840s. In 1847 he bought 1923 manuscripts from Count Guglielmo Libri. Libri was a collector and dealer who had stolen a large number of items from French public libraries while he was employed to create a union catalogue of manuscripts in the library collections. In 1845 Libri offered to sell his collection of manuscripts to the British Museum. Frederic Madden, head of the Museum's manuscript department, recommended the purchase but the Treasury would not grant the necessary funds. Libri then offered the collection to Lord Ashburnham, who purchased it in March 1847 for £8,000. Notable among the manuscripts was a 7th-century illuminated manuscript of the Pentateuch which Libri had stolen from the library at Tours, where it was known as the Tours Pentateuch. Since its acquisition by Lord Ashburnham it has been called the Ashburnham Pentateuch. The collection also included manuscripts of Dante and Napoleon's correspondence. In 1850 Libri, who had fled to England, was convicted in absentia of theft by a French court. The French government asked Ashburnham to return the Libri manuscripts, offering to reimburse the amount he had paid, but he refused on the grounds that he believed Libri was innocent and had not received a fair trial.

In May 1849 Ashburnham purchased a collection of 702 manuscripts from the French collector Joseph Barrois for £6000. A visit by Paul Meyer of the Bibliothèque nationale de France to the library at Ashburnham Place in 1865 led to the discovery that 64 of the Barrois manuscripts consisted of 33 items that had been stolen from the Bibliothèque nationale, divided and rebound.

Ashburnham was not accused or suspected of knowingly purchasing stolen goods. He eventually conceded, based on evidence put forward by Paul Meyer and Léopold Delisle of the Bibliothèque nationale, that some of the Libri and Barrois manuscripts had been stolen but he declined to return them to their rightful owners.

In 1849 Ashburnham purchased a collection of 996 manuscripts from the library of Stowe House. He paid £8,000 for the collection, which had been catalogued in preparation for sale by public auction after the bankruptcy of the 2nd Duke of Buckingham and Chandos. The remaining manuscripts in Ashburnham's collection were acquired individually and were identified as the "Appendix" collection.

After the 4th Earl's death in 1878, the 5th Earl sold off the manuscript collections over the course of more than twenty years, ending in 1901 with the sale of the last of the Barrois collection.

Peerage of Great Britain
Preceded by George Ashburnham	Earl of Ashburnham; 1830–1878	Succeeded by Bertram Ashburnham
