= Siege of Oxford =

Part of the First English Civil War in 1644–1646

Coordinates: 51.75°N 1.26°W

- Part of the First English Civil War
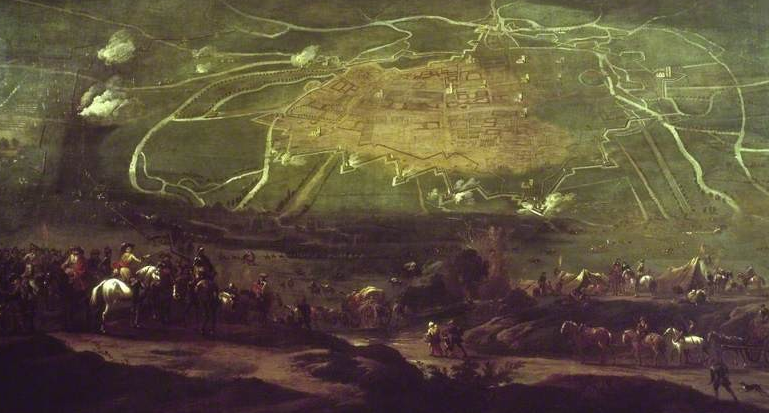
- The Siege of Oxford by Jan Wyck, 1689
Date	First siege 27 May 1644 – 4 June 1644; Second siege 22 May 1645 – 5 June 1645; Third siege 1 May 1646 – 25 June 1646
Location	Oxford, Oxfordshire
Result	Parliamentarian victory

Belligerents
Royalists	Parliamentarians

Commanders and leaders
Charles I (surrendered); Prince Rupert	Sir William Waller; Sir Thomas Fairfax

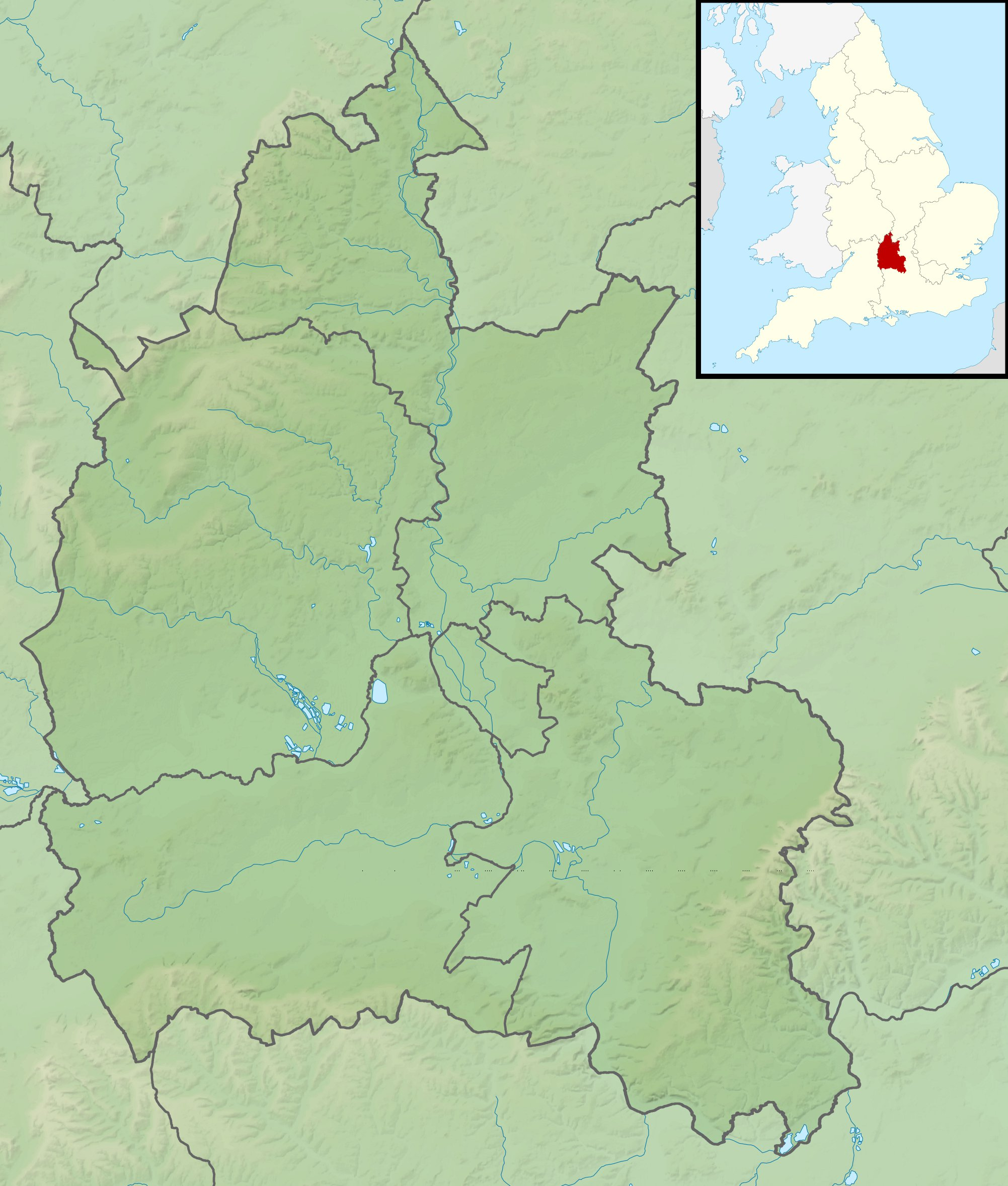
Oxfordshire and Oxford

The siege of Oxford consisted of the English Civil War military campaigns waged to besiege the Royalist controlled city of Oxford. These were three short engagements over a period of twenty-five months, The siege ended with a Parliamentarian victory in June 1646.

The first engagement was in May 1644, during which King Charles I escaped, thus preventing a formal siege. The second, in May 1645, had barely started when Sir Thomas Fairfax was given orders to stop and pursue the King to Naseby instead. The last siege began in May 1646 and was a formal siege of two months; but the war was obviously over and negotiation, rather than fighting, took precedence. Being careful not to inflict too much damage on the city, Fairfax even sent in food to the King's second son, James, and was happy to conclude the siege with an honourable agreement before any further escalation occurred.

== Oxford during the civil war ==
The creation of the King's Oxford Parliament in January 1644 placed Oxford at the centre of the Cavalier cause, and the city became the headquarters of the King's forces. This had advantages and disadvantages for both parties; although the majority of citizens supported the Roundheads, supplying the Royalist court and garrison gave them financial opportunities. The location of Oxford gave the King the strategic advantage in controlling the Midland counties, but the disadvantages of the city became increasingly manifest. Despite this, any proposals to retreat to the southwest were silenced, particularly by those enjoying the comforts of university accommodation. The King was at Christ Church and the Queen at Merton. The executive committee of the Privy Council met at Oriel; St John's housed the French ambassador and the two Palatine princes Rupert and Maurice; All Souls, New College, and St Mary's College housed respectively the arsenal, the magazine and an ordnance factory; (Note: Varley 1932, p. 66, states "St Mary's College (Frewin Hall) was used for casting ordnance": Manganiello 2004, p. 406, states that "Frewin Hall" was converted to a "cannon factory".) while the mills in Osney became a powder factory. At New Inn Hall, the requisitioned college plate was melted down into 'Oxford Crowns', and at Carfax, there was a gibbet. University life continued, although somewhat restricted and disturbed; the future kings Charles II (then Prince of Wales) and James II (then Duke of York) were given Master of Arts degrees, as were many others for non-academic reasons. Throughout, both sides employed poor strategies and suffered from weak intelligence, and there was less animosity between the sides than is usual in such wars.

== First siege (1644) ==
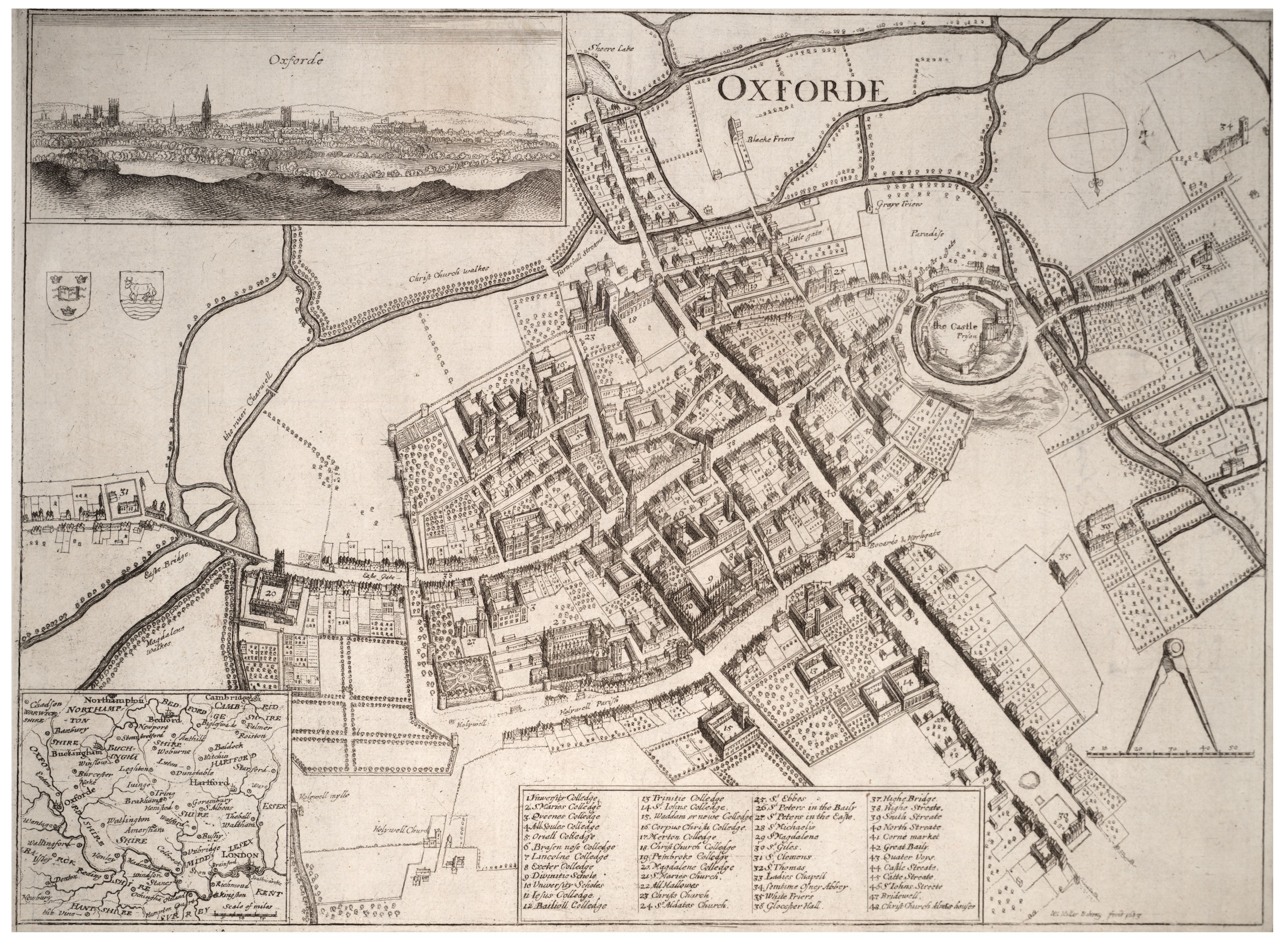
On the left and upper left, the River Cherwell, Magdalen Bridge (East Bridge), and Christ Church Meadow (Christ Church walks) are marked on Wenceslaus Hollar's map of Oxford. Headington Hill and Marston are off the left hand side of the map.

Late in May 1644 Edmund Ludlow joined Sir William Waller at Abingdon to blockade Oxford. According to Sir Edward Walker's diary, on 27 May Waller attempted to cross the Isis at Newbridge, but was defeated by Royalist dragoons. The following day, the Earl of Essex and his army forded the river at Sandford-on-Thames, halting on Bullingdon Green in full view of the city. (Note: ...to the south-east of the city, between Horspath and Cowley.) Whilst the main army marched on to Islip to make quarters there, the Earl of Essex and a small party of horse came within cannon shot to make a closer inspection of the place. For a large part of 29 May, various parties of Parliamentarian horse troop went up and down Headington Hill and had a few skirmishes near the ports, although little damage was made on either side—the work at St Clement's Port made three or four great shot at them, driving them back to the main body of troops. (Note: Dugdale 1827, p. 68, entry for 29 May, "several parties of horse came to the foot of Headington Hill within cannon shot of the works. 4 shots made at them. They took a cart laden with household stuff, within musket shot of the works.") The King, being at that time on the top of Magdalen Tower, had a clear view of the troops' manoeuvres.

On 30 May and 31 May the Parliamentarians made unsuccessful attempts to cross the River Cherwell at Gosford Bridge, and Earl of Cleveland Thomas Wentworth made a demonstration with 150 horse troops towards Abingdon, where Waller had 1,000 foot and 400 horse troops. Entering the town, Cleveland captured forty prisoners, but was pursued so heavily they escaped, and although he killed the commander of their party, the Royalists lost Captains de Lyne and Trist, with many more wounded.

Waller finally succeeded in forcing the passage at Newbridge on 2 June, and a large contingent crossed the Isis in boats. The King went to Woodstock to hold council and in the late evening heard news that Waller had brought some 5,000 horse and foot through Newbridge, some of which were within three miles of Woodstock. Islip and the passes over the Cherwell were abandoned, leaving matches burning at the bridges to deceive the Parliamentarians, the Royalists retreated to Oxford, arriving there in the early morning of 3 June. Walker notes that there was not enough supplies to last fourteen days and that if the army stayed in the city and were besieged, all would be lost in a matter of days. It was decided the King should leave Oxford that night: the King ordered a large part of the army, with cannon, to march through the city towards Abingdon to act as a diversion. The King constituted a council to govern affairs in his absence and ordered all others who were to join him to be ready at the sound of a trumpet. After a few hours, the army returned from Abingdon, having successfully drawn off Waller.

On the night of 3 June 1644 at about 9 p.m. the King and Prince Charles, accompanied by various Lords and a party of 2,500 musketeers, joined the body of horse, taking the van which then marched to Wolvercote and on to Yarnton towards Long Hanborough, Northleigh and Burford, which they reached at about 4 p.m. on 4 June. The army's Colours had been left standing and a further diversion was arranged by the 3,500 infantry left with the cannon in North Oxford. The Earl of Essex and his troops had crossed the River Cherwell and had some troops in Woodstock, while Waller and his forces were between Newbridge and Eynsham. Although without heavy baggage, the King had some sixty to seventy carriages, a large troop to have got through undiscovered. The parliamentarian scouting was seriously at fault, unaided by the lack of co-operation between Essex and Waller, it led to a disgraceful inability on the part of two large armies to counter the escape of the King. The escape being discovered, Waller made haste in pursuit, taking some few stragglers in Burford who had "regarded their drink more than their safety". The King and his forces, after assembling in the fields beyond Bourton, continued to march on to Worcester. A letter from Lord Digby to Prince Rupert dated 17 June 1644, gives an indication of the immensity of the lost opportunities;

The truth of it is, had Essex and Waller jointly either pursued us or attacked Oxford, we had been lost. In the one course Oxford had been yielded up to them, having not a fortnight's provisions, and no hopes of relief. In the other Worcester had been lost, and the King forced to retreat to your Highness.

Following the unproductive efforts by Essex and Waller to capture Oxford and the King, Sergeant-Major General Browne was appointed command of Parliamentarian forces on 8 June, with orders for the reduction of Oxford, Wallingford, Banbury, and the Fort of Greenland House. Browne was also to select and preside over a council of war of twelve men, and although he greatly troubled Oxford from then on, there were no further attempts on the city during the 1644 campaign season.

== Second siege (1645) ==
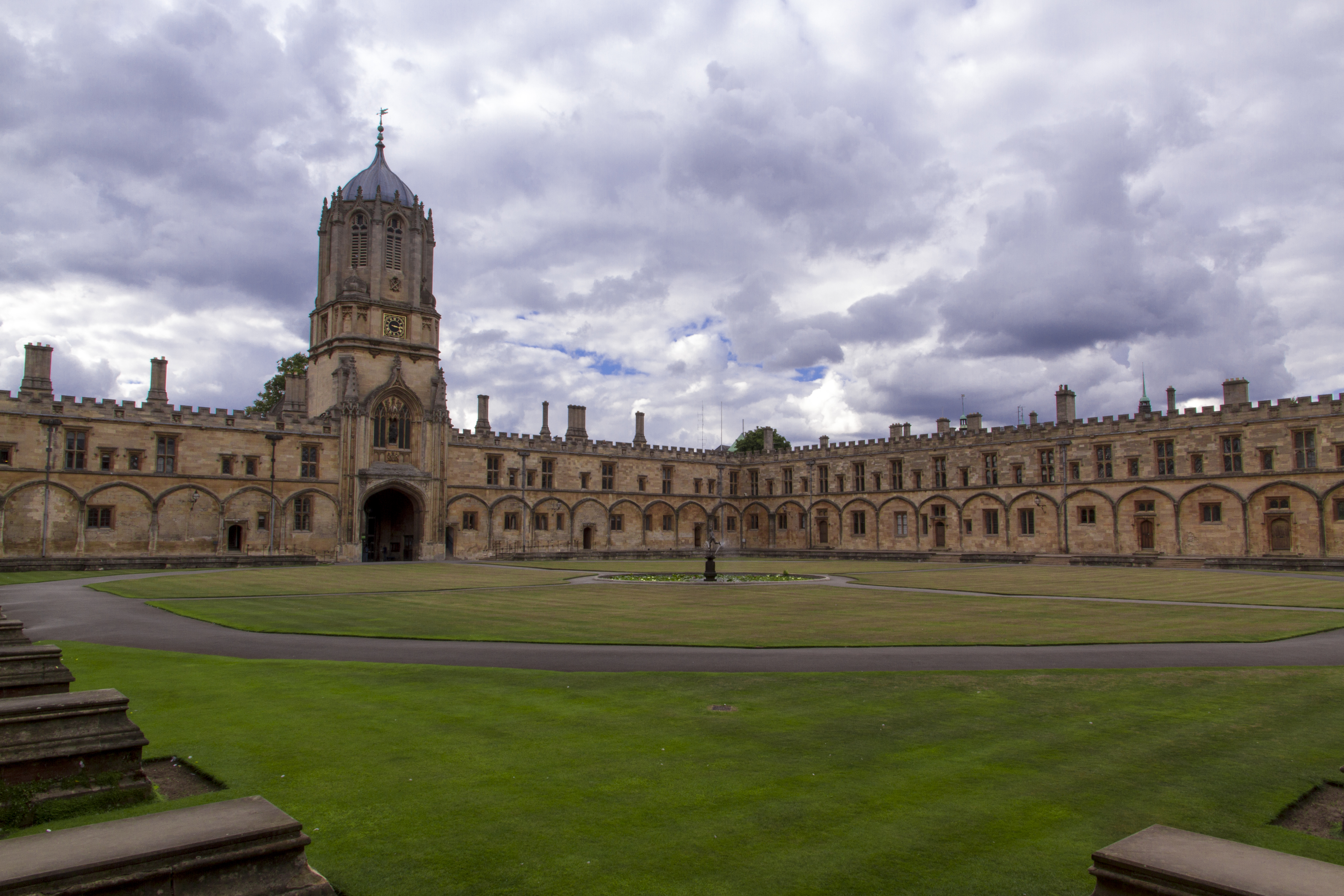
A modern-day view of Christ Church, Oxford, King Charles' residence in the city.

In the New Year, one of the first objectives of the New Model Army was the blockade and siege of Oxford, initially intending that Oliver Cromwell and Browne go to Oxford, while Fairfax marched to the west. Fairfax was in Reading on 30 April 1645 and by 4 May had reached Andover, where he received orders to prevent Prince Rupert getting to Oxford. On 6 May Fairfax was ordered to join Cromwell and Browne at Oxford and to send 3,000 foot soldiers and 1,500 horse soldiers to relieve Taunton, which he accomplished on 12 May. The committee had ordered a voluntary contribution from Oxfordshire, Buckinghamshire and Berkshire to raise forces to take Oxford and on 17 May planned for funding Fairfax in the reducing of Oxford, so that "it may prevent all Provisions and Ammunition to be brought in". On 19 May Fairfax arrived in Cowley and made his way over Bullingdon Green and on to Marston, showing himself on Headington Hill. On 22 May he began the siege by raising a breastwork on the east side of the River Cherwell and erecting a bridge at Marston. On 23 May the House of Commons gave the Committee of the Army orders to "make Provision for such Money and Necessaries for the Siege of Oxon, as they have or shall Receive directions for from the Committee of Both Kingdoms, not exceeding the Sum of Six thousand Pounds", having already agreed that £10,000 was to await Fairfax at Windsor, along with the following provision for a siege:

- 2 demi cannons and 3 whole culverins (ready at Windsor and Northampton)
- 1,200 spades and shovels
- 500 pickaxes
- 300 steel spades
- 200 scaling ladders
- 500 barrels of gunpowder
- 40 tons of match
- 30 tons of bullet
- 300 great grenado shells
- 300 small grenado shells
- 1,000 hand grenades
- 20 carriages for provisions
- 200 horse harness

According to Sir William Dugdale's diary, on 23 May Fairfax was at Marston and his troops began crossing the river, the outhouses of Godstow House were fired, causing the occupants to evacuate to Oxford, and the house occupied by the Parliamentarians. On 26 May Fairfax put four regiments of foot soldiers with thirteen carriages by the newly erected bridge at Marston, the King's forces 'drowned' the meadow, fired houses in the suburbs and placed a garrison at Wolvercote. Whilst viewing the ongoing works, Fairfax had a narrow escape from being shot. On the following day two of Fairfax's regiments—the white and the red—with two pieces of ordnance marched to Godstow House and on to Hinksey. The Auxiliaries on duty in Oxford; the Lord Keeper, the Lord Treasurer, and the Mayor of Oxford marched before their Companies to the Guards. In the evening of 29 May a "bullet of ix lb. weight, shot from the Rebels warning piece at Marston, fell against the wall on the north side of the Hall in Christ Church". Meanwhile Gaunt House near Newbridge was under siege by Colonel Thomas Rainsborough with 600 foot soldiers and 200 horse. Next day the sound of firing at Gaunt House could be heard in Oxford and the following day Rainsborough took the house and 50 prisoners.

In the early hours of the morning on 2 June the troops in Oxford made a sally and a party of foot and horse attacked the Parliamentarian Guard at Headington Hill, killing 50 and taking 96 prisoners, many seriously wounded. In the afternoon Parliamentarian forces drove off 50 cattle grazing in fields outside the East Gate. On 3 June the prisoners taken the day before were exchanged and the following day the siege was raised and the bridge over the River Cherwell was demolished. The Parliamentarian forces withdrew the troops from Botley and Hinksey, and also withdrew from their headquarters at Marston and on 5 June they completed evacuating Marston and Wolvercote. The reason for such a sudden withdrawal was that the King, Prince Rupert, Prince Maurice, and the Earl of Lindsey, Montagu Bertie and others had left Oxford on 7 May. In the meantime, Fairfax, who disliked spending time in siege warfare, had prevailed upon the committee to allow him to lift the siege and follow the King. A letter by Fairfax to his father dated 4 June 1645 explains:

I am very sorry we should spend our time unprofitably before a town, whilst the King hath time to strengthen himself, and by terror to force obedience of all places where he comes; the Parliament is sensible of this now, therefore hath sent me directions to raise the siege and march to Buckingham, where, I believe, I shall have orders to advance northwards, in such a course as all our divided parties may join. It is the earnest desire of this Army to follow the King, but the endeavours of others prevent it hath so much prevailed.

On 5 June, Fairfax abandoned the siege, having received orders to engage the King and recapture Leicester instead.

== Third siege (1646) ==
The King returned to Oxford on 5 November 1645 to quarter for the winter. The Royalists planned to resume the campaign in the spring and sent Lord Astley to Worcester to collect a force from Wales. However, on the journey back his troops were routed at Stow-on-the-Wold by Parliamentarian forces under the command of Sir William Brereton, and Astley and his officers were taken prisoner. Two letters from the King to the Queen are of note; (Note: Varley 1932, p. 132, states both letters being in the Wilton MSS, adding a footnote to Camden Society, O.S., No. 63.) the first, dated 6 April 1646 advised her that he was expecting to be received into the Scots army, the second letter of his is dated 22 April stated: "I resolved from hence to venture breaking thro' the rebells' quarters (which, upon my word, was neither a safe nor an easy work) to meet them where they should appoint; and I was so eager upon it, that, had it not been for Pr. Rupert's backwardness, I had tryed it without hearing from them, being impatient of delay" and that the King intended to travel in disguise to King's Lynn and on to Montrose by sea.

The committee in London again ordered its forces to 'straiten' Oxford. On 18 March there was a skirmish between the Oxford Horse and troops commanded by Colonel Charles Fleetwood, and 2,000 Parliamentarians under the command of Rainsborough came into Woodstock from Witney. On 30 March Rainsborough's foot soldiers and all four of Fairfax's horse regiments were ordered to "such places as will wholly block up Oxford" and make the inhabitants "presently to live at the expense of their Stores". On 3 April Browne, the Governor of Abingdon, was ordered to send fifty barrels of gunpowder to Rainsborough.

On 4 April Colonel Henry Ireton was given orders by Fairfax to join those forces assembling for the 'straitening' of Oxford. On 10 April the House of Commons referred to the committee to "take some course for the stricter Blocking up of Oxon, and guarding the Passes between Oxon and the Cities of London and Westminster", the committee was directed to draw up a general summons to ask the King's garrisons to surrender under a penalty for refusal. On 15 April the sound of cannon firing against Woodstock Manor House could be heard in Oxford, and at about 6 p.m. Rainsborough's troops attacked but were beaten back, losing 100 men, their scaling ladders were taken and many others wounded. On 26 April the Manor House was surrendered, its Governor and his soldiers, without their weapons, (Note: Rushworth 1722, pp. 249–276, "Woodstock surrendred 26 Apr. ...the Field-Officers to March away with their Swords, the other Officers and Soldiers without Arms, to have a Convoy to Oxford.") returned to Oxford in the evening. The King left the city early in the morning of 27 April without disclosing his destination to those privy to his departure; There are two letters from Colonel Payne, commander of the garrison in Abingdon, to Browne—one dated 27 April reporting intelligence that the King went in disguise to London, making use of Fairfax's seal that had been duplicated by them in Oxford; the other is dated 29 April noting the common reports of the King's flight:

The news of the king's going to London is constantly confirmed by all that come from Oxford; that he went out disguised in a montero and a hat upon it; that sir Thomas Glemham at his parting bid him "Farewell Harry", by which name it seems he goes. There went with him only the earl of Southampton, Dr. King, and Mr. Ashburnham; (Note: Clarendon 1888, p. 192, states the King left Oxford "attended only by John Ashburnham, and a scholar, (one Hudson,)", Rushworth 1722, pp. 249–276 has "King leaves Oxford, 27 April ...in Company only of Dr. Hudson, a Divine, and Mr. John Ashburnham, and rode as Servant to the latter, with a Cloak-bag behind him." and Madan 1895, p. 419, 1857 has "Kings going ...Master Ashburnham is gone this evening out of Oxford with two more, one who passed Oxford guard, as Ashburnhams man is said to be the King.") that presently after his going out there was a great meeting in Oxford. Sir Thomas got some blows amongst the rout, and escaped narrowly with his life two or three times; Rupert and Maurice have both disbanded; the governor is fain to keep a strong guard about him.

On 30 April the House of Commons, having heard of the King's flight the previous day, issued orders that no person was to be allowed "out of Oxford, by pass or otherwise, except it be upon parley or treaty, concerning the surrendering of the garrison, of some fort, or otherwise advantageous, for reducing of the garrison". On 1 May, Fairfax returned to Oxford to place the city under siege, as had been expected. On 2 May Parliamentarian soldiers entered the villages around Oxford, such as Headington and Marston, following a general rendezvous of the army at Bullingdon Green. On 3 May the Parliamentarians held a council of war where it was decided that a "Quarter" on Headington Hill should be made to hold 3,000 men, it was also decided to build a bridge over the River Cherwell at Marston. The General's regiment and that of Colonel Pickering were to be stationed at Headington, the Major General's and Colonel Harley's at Marston, Colonel Thomas Herbert's, and Colonel Sir Hardress Waller's Regiments at Cowley, whilst the train of artillery was placed at Elsfield, a fourth quarter was made on the north side of Oxford, where most of the foot troops were assembled to enable approaches across ground near to the city walls. (Note: Whitelocke 1682, p. 204, entry for 12 May "the approaches were so near that the Officers and Soldiers of either Parties, parlied one with another".) Meanwhile, the towns of Faringdon, Radcot, Wallingford and Boarstall House were completely blockaded. Within cannon shot from the city, Fairfax's men began to construct a line from the 'Great Fort' on Headington Hill towards St Clement's, lying outside Magdalen Bridge. On 6 May the magazine for provisions in Oxford was opened and from then on 4,700 were fed from it, "being more by 1,500, as 'twas thought, than upon a true muster the soldiers were".

On 11 May Fairfax sent in a demand of surrender to the Governor:

Sir,

I do by these summon you to deliver up the City of Oxford into my hands, for the use of the Parliament. I very much desire the preservation of that place (so famous for learning), from ruin, which inevitably is like to fall upon it, except you concur. You may have honourable terms for yourself and all within that garrison if you reasonably accept thereof. I desire the answer this day, and remain

Your servant

THO. FAIRFAX.

That afternoon, Prince Rupert was wounded for the first time, being shot in the upper arm whilst on a raiding party in the fields to the North of Oxford. On 13 May the first shot was fired from the 'Great Fort' on Headington Hill, the shot falling in Christ Church Meadow. The Governor, Sir Thomas Glemham, and the officers of the garrison of Oxford gave the opinion to the Lords of the Privy Council that the city was defensible.

On 14 May the Governor of Oxford, under direction from the Privy Council, sent a letter to Fairfax offering to treat on the Monday (18 May), asking for their commissioners to meet. Fairfax, in council of war, sent a reply the same day, agreeing to the time and naming Mr Unton Croke's house at Marston as the meeting place. The Privy Council ordered that all their books and papers of parliamentary proceedings transacted in Oxford were to be burned. On 16 May the Governor gave the Privy Council a paper requiring that the Lords "justify under their hands that they have regal power in the King's absence; namely, to deliver up Garrisons, levy forces and the like. Whereupon the Lords signed a paper whereby they challenged the like power". On 17 May the Governor and all his principal officers of the garrison signed a paper "manifesting their dislike in opinion of the present Treaty", and alleged it was forced upon them by the Lords of Council:

Oxon. 17 May 1646.

We, the Officers of the Garrison of Oxford, who have here underwritten our names, do hereby declare upon our several reputations that it is absolutely against our wills and opinions to treat at this present with Sir Thomas Fairfax.

But upon the Governor's intimation of order received by him from the King to observe what the body of the Privy Council should determine in his absence, have in obedience to His Majesty's order been forced by the Privy Council to this treaty.

And do further declare to the world, that what inconvenience soever may arise to the King's cause or his friends upon this Treaty, is not in our hands to prevent.

This disclaimer of responsibility did little to delay the progress of the Treaty, the civilians, with a better sense of the situation, thought that delay "might be of ill consequence". The same day the Governor sent his acceptance and names of his commissioners to Fairfax; Sir John Monson, Sir John Heydon, Sir Thomas Gardiner, Sir George Binyon, Sir Richard Willis, Sir Stephen Hawkyns, Colonels Robert Gosnold and Henry Tillier, Richard Zouch, Thomas Chicheley, John Dutton, Geoffrey Palmer, Philip Warwick, and Captain Robert Mead. Fairfax, in return sent the names of his commissioners; Thomas Hammond, Henry Ireton, Colonels John Lambert, Charles Rich and Robert Harley, Leonard Watson, Majors John Desborough and Thomas Harrison, Thomas Herbert and Hardress Waller; later, the names of Henry Boulstred, John Mills and Matthew Hale were added.

=== Treaty ===
Some discussion followed about it being usual at all treaties to appoint secretaries, to which Fairfax agreed; the Oxford commissioners were to bring Henry Davidson as their secretary, the Parliamentarians would bring William Clark. The first session took place at Croke's house on 18 May, as originally agreed. A letter from N.T. (whose identity is unknown) in Marston on 20 May complains about the 'lumbering at Oxford' and the procrastination of the Oxford commissioners; the letter concludes:

God knowes when we shall have Oxford by Treaty if they come on no better then hitherto they have seemed; but however the Generall goes on to be in a readinesse to take it another way; for we do not desire to drall here but do the work we are sent about.

A first draft of the articles was referred by Fairfax to the House of Commons, presented by Colonel Rich on 22 May. The Journals of the House record that the House did "upon the very first view of them, disdain those Articles and overtures offered by those at Oxon" and left Fairfax to "proceed effectually, according to the trust reposed in him, for the speedy gaining and reducing the garrison of Oxon to the obedience of the Parliament". On 23 May the commissioners returned to Marston and according to Dugdale's diary "the adverse party pretended our Articles to be too high, said they would offer Articles, and so the Treaty broke off at the time". On 25 May a Committee of nine Lords and nine of the Commons was constituted to consider honourable conditions for Oxford's surrender. A conference of both Houses met upon a letter from the King, written from Newcastle, dated 18 May, enclosing a letter for Glemham, the debate continued into the following day. The King's letter regarding Oxford stated:

Trusty and Well-beloved, We greet you well. Being desirous to stop the further Effusion of the Blood of Our Subjects, and yet respecting the faithful Services of all in that Our City of Oxford which have faithfully served Us, and hazarded their Lives for Us: We have thought good to command you to quit that City, and disband the Forces under your Charge there, you receiving Honourable Conditions for you and them.

On 15 June the heads of conference with the Commons viewed the King's letter of 18 May and another from the King, dated 10 June, which was similar in terms, but included an order from the King "directed to the Governors of Oxford, Lichfield, Worcester, Wallingford, and all other Commanders of any his Towns, Castles, and Forts within England and Wales". The heads of conference wanted the warrant sent to Fairfax and for him to forward it on. In the Commons it was ordered that the warrant of 10 June be sent to all Governors "for Preventing of the further Effusion of Christian Blood".

Dugdale's diary for 30 May records: "This evening Sir Tho. Fairfax sent in a Trumpet to Oxford, with Articles concerning the delivery thereof". Rushworth, who was Fairfax's secretary at the time stated that Fairfax drew up the Articles; however, the Committee of the two Houses appointed on 25 May may have had a hand in them. The Treaty was renewed, the Oxford commissioners taking the stance that they submitted themselves "to the Fate of the Kingdom, rather than any way distrusting their own Strength, or the Garrison's Tenableness". The resumption of the Treaty coincided with a seemingly random exchange of cannon fire, Oxford loosing 200 shot in the day, managing to land a great shot in the Leaguer on Headington Hill, killing Colonel Cotsworth. A sutler and others were killed in Rainsborough's camp, while the Parliamentarian "cannon in recompense played fiercely upon the defendants, and much annoyed them in their works, houses, and colleges, till at last a cessation of great shot was agreed to on both sides".

On 1 June Fairfax was prepared to take the city by storm if necessary. On 3 June Oxford forces made a sally from East Port, and about 100 cavalry troopers attempted drive in some cattle grazing near Cowley, but the Parliamentarian horse countered them in skirmishes, during which Captain Richardson and two more were killed. On 4 June the commissioners met again in Marston to consider the new articles offered by Fairfax. On 8 June various Oxford gentlemen delivered a paper of particulars to the Privy Council, which they wanted to add into the Treaty, asking to be informed of the proceedings and to be allowed attendance with the commissioners. On 9 June the commissioners were sworn to secrecy over the talks and forbidden to say anything about their proceedings. On 10 June Fairfax sent a present of "a brace of Bucks, 2 Muttons, 2 Veals, 2 Lambs, 6 Capons, and Butter" into Oxford for the Duke of York (James II). A letter from Fairfax to his father, dated 13 June, states:

Our Treaty doth still continue. All things are agreed upon concerning the soldiers, and they are satisfied with it. The article that took up the greatest debate was about composition. We have accepted of two years' revenue; so that is concluded to. We think Monday will conclude all the rest. I think they do really desire to conclude with us.

On 17 June there was a general cessation of arms and extensive fraternizing between the two armies. The Privy Council did not dare meet in the Audit House as was usual "in regard of the mutinous soldiers, especially reformadoes". The following day the clergy with others reproached the Lords of the Privy Council for the terms of the Treaty; the next day, the Lords of the Privy Council walked with swords on, fearing for their own safety. On 20 June the Articles of Surrender, including provisions for academics and citizens, were agreed upon at Water Eaton, (Note: Madan 1895, p. 425, 1877 Copy of the common edition of the ultimate articles, but is "Dated at Water-Eaton, June 2oth, 1646", thus not printed from the official Parliamentary edition, but independently at Oxford, the form of the title showing that the ratification of Parliament had not been waited for Whitelocke 1682, pp. 210–213 reproduces the articles and has the same place-date attribution.) and signed in the Audit House of Christ Church; for the first side by the Privy Council and the Governor of Oxford, and Fairfax for the other.

On 21 June the Lords of the Privy Council held a meeting with the gentlemen of the town in the Audit House, at which the Lord Keeper made a speech about the need to conclude the Treaty, and read them the authority of the two letters from the King. A copy of the Moderate Intelligencer was produced, along with an account of the Scots "pressing the King's conscience so far that sundry times he was observed to retire and weep", which affected the Lord Keeper similarly. On 22 June Princes Rupert and Maurice were given permission by Fairfax to leave Oxford and go to Oatlands, to see the Elector, despite it being contrary to the terms of the Articles. The matter was debated in the House of Commons on 26 June, the Princes were commanded "to repair to the Sea Side, within Ten Days; and forwith to depart the Kingdom". Prince Rupert sent a long letter, from himself and Maurice, arguing that they did not violate the terms of the Treaty, but offered to submit if his argument failed.

On 24 June, the day set for the Treaty to come into operation, the evacuation of Oxford by the Royalists began. It was not possible to withdraw the entire garrison in one day, but under Article 5 a large body of the regular garrison, some 2,000 to 3,000 men, marched out of the city with all the honours of war. (Note: Wood 1796, p. 485, "...The Defendants marched out at about 12 of the clock at noon, and a Guard of the Enemy was appointed for them to march through, extending in length from St. Clement's to Shotover Hill, they also having in their rear, several bodies of Horse. They marched out in a Body well armed with Colours flying and Drums beating, the number 3000, the injury or affront offered to them none at all, as Glemham the Governor did then acknowledge.") Those living in North Oxford went by the North Port, and some 900 marched out over Magdalen Bridge, on to Headington Hill between the lines of the Parliamentarian troops, and on to Thame where they were disarmed and dispersed with their passes. The form of pass issued by Fairfax was:

Sir Thomas Fairfax Knight Generall of the Forces raised by the Parliament.
Suffer the bearer hereof [blank] who was in the City and Garrison of Oxford, at the Surrender thereof, and is to have the full benefit of the Articles agreed unto upon the Surrender, quietly and without let or interruption to pass your Guards with [his] Servants, Horses, Armes, Goods, and all other necessaries, and so repaire unto London or elsewhere upon [his] necessary occasions. And in all Places where he shall reside, or whereto he shall remove, to be protected, from any Violence to [his] Person, Goods, or Estate, according to the said Articles, & to have full Liberty at any time within Six Months, to goe to any convenient Port, and Transport [him]selfe, with [his] Servants, Goods, and necessaries beyond the Seas, And in all other things to enjoy the Benefit of the said Articles. Hereunto due Obedience is to be given, by all Persons whom it may concerne, as they will answer the contrary. (Note: Pass issued to "George Tryme, Secretarie to the right honourable the lord marques of Hertford" dated 26 June, bearing Fairfax's signature and seal; Original in Bodleian Library, listed in Madan 1895, p. 427 as 1881.)

Although 2,000 passes were issued over a few days, a number of people had to wait their turn. On 25 June the keys of the city were formally handed over to Fairfax; with the larger part of the regular Oxford garrison having left the day before, he sent in three regiments of foot soldiers to maintain order. The evacuation subsequently continued in an orderly fashion, and peace returned to Oxford.

== See also ==
- Siege of Reading
