= John Bushnell =

English sculptor (1636-1701)

John Bushnell (1636–1701) was an English sculptor, known for several outstanding funeral monuments in English churches including Westminster Abbey.

== Life ==
He was born in 1636 in Holborn in London the son of a plumber. Around 1650 he was apprenticed as a sculptor and stonemason to Thomas Burman. Falsely accused of making Burman's maidservant pregnant he took leave of absence during an unsupervised job and fled to France, taking £15 of Burman's cash with him.

Bushnell stayed two years in France, before going to Italy where he spent some time in Rome, and then in Venice, where he made a monument depicting the Siege of Candia and a naval battle for a Procutare di San Marco. He returned to England via Hamburg after 22 years in self-enforced exile.

His first works on his return included statues of Charles I, Charles II and Sir Thomas Gresham for the Royal Exchange. He had intended to make a complete set of kings for the exchange "but hearing that another person... had made interest to carve some of them, Bushnell would not proceed, though he had begun six or seven".

Anecdotes concerning his haughty disposition and increasing eccentricity were repeated in artistic circles and recorded in the eighteenth century by George Vertue in his notebooks. One of these stories involves his attempt to prove that the Trojan Horse was not a fable but a practical possibility. He is said to have spent £500 on constructing a timber horse, its head capable of seating twelve men, but it was wrecked by a storm before it was completed, and Bushnell was too disillusioned to continue with the project, although two vintners, who had contracted to use the horse as a drinking-booth, offered to pay for its reconstruction.

Following his death in 1701, his widow Mary and his sons continued to live in his half-finished house near Hyde Park, London, keeping at bay the strangers who were curious to see Bushnel's remaining sculptures, and by degrees destroying them. A monument, probably his last, is in the North Chapel of St. Andrews Church, Great Billing in Northampton. it is possible that this was moved here unfinished following his death.

In the mid-nineteenth century Bushnell's reputation stood high enough for an imaginary portrait representing him to be included amongst the world's great sculptors in the Frieze of Parnassus on the Albert Memorial, in Kensington Gardens in London.

He died of gout in May 1701 and was buried in St Mary's Church in Paddington Green, London on 15 May.

== Selected works ==
The following list is drawn from Rupert Gunnis, Dictionary of British Sculptors 1660–1851 (rev. ed. 1968), s.v. "Bushnell, John".

- Monument of Alvise Mocenigo, S. Lazaro dei Medicanti, Venice, 1663
- Charles II and Catherine of Braganza. Standing figures on Temple Bar, London, 1670.
- Funeral effigy for the Duke of Albemarle's funeral in Westminster Abbey, the face and hands in wax, the robed figure in stucco, 1670.
- Funeral monument of Henry Stanley, Little Gaddesden, Hertfordshire, 1670.
- Charles I, Charles II, and Sir Thomas Gresham for the Royal Exchange, 1671. Conserved in Old Bailey.
- Monument to Abraham Cowley (died 1667), Westminster Abbey 1674.
- Monument of William Ashburnham and his wife, Ashburnham, Sussex 1675.
- Monument of Lord Mordaunt, Fulham Parish Church, 1675.
- Monument to Elizabeth, Lady Myddleton, and two portrait busts of Sir Thomas and Lady Myddelton, Chirk Parish Church, Denbighshire, 1676.
- Monument to Lady May, Mid-Lavant, West Sussex, 1676
- Monument of Sir Palmes Fairborne, Westminster Abbey, 1680.
- (attributed) Monument of Lady Henrietta Wentworth, Toddington, Bedfordshire, 1686.
- Monument to the Earl of Thomund, from the Sarah, Countess Dowager of Thomund, possibly his last work, St. Andrews, Great Billing, Northampton, 1700.
