= Thomas Waite (regicide) =

English soldier, Member of Parliament and regicide

Thomas Waite (died 1688 in Jersey), also known as Thomas Wayte, was an English soldier who fought for Parliament in the English Civil War, a Member of Parliament for Rutland, and one of the regicides of King Charles I.

Waite was probably the son of Henry Waite of Wymondham, Leicestershire; but some royalist sources said he was the son of an alehouse keeper in Market Overton in Rutland.

He was admitted to Gray's Inn in 1634. He was Sheriff of Rutland in 1641. Going into the Parliament army, he made such good use of his time, that he obtained a colonel's commission, and a seat in the Long Parliament. In 1643, he beat up the king's quarters near Burley House; at this time he was a colonel, and probably then, or immediately after, became, in consequence of it, governor of Burley-on-the-Hill, in Rutland.

Waite wrote to Parliament in 1648, that he had fallen upon those who had made an insurrection at Stamford, Lincolnshire, and, at Woodcroft Castle, had killed Dr Hudson, who had commanded those forces, with some others, and taken many prisoners, but had dismissed the countrymen. The House replied with their thanks, and ordered that the general should send him a commission to try the prisoners by martial law. Soon afterwards he reported the defeat and capture of the Duke of Hamilton.

As one of the army-grandees, Waite was one of the 59 Commissioners who sat in judgment at the trial of Charles I. He attended the trial on 25, 26, and 27 January 1649, the first two in the Painted Chamber, and in the last of these in Westminster Hall, when sentence was pronounced against Charles, and he signed and sealed that instrument, which commanded Charles to execution.

After this event, we hear nothing of Waite, until the restoration; he seems neglected by Parliament, and totally given up by Oliver Cromwell, when he became Lord Protector, who even omitted his name as one of the committee for Rutland, which he had enjoyed during the first Commonwealth. In 1650, he acquired the Duke of Buckingham's Rutland estates. On 13 March 1654 his tenants at Hambleton, Rutland petitioned the council of state complaining of Waite doubling their rents, diverting their water supply, enclosing their commons, and endeavouring to evict eighty families.

He was not granted a general pardon under the Act of Indemnity, and having surrendered himself, was brought to the bar, at the Session's House, in the Old Bailey, 10 October 1660. He was extremely troublesome to the court at his arraignment as he would not plead guilty or not guilty when asked to do so and prevaricated. At his trial he was found guilty of regicide, but his sentence was commuted to life imprisonment as the court decided that he had been forced by Cromwell and Henry Ireton into agreeing to the Kings execution, to such a degree that Cromwell had guided Waite's hand when he signed the death warrant. Waite's wife, Jane, unsuccessfully petitioned for his release for the sake of their five children and Wayte was imprisoned in Mont Orgueil Castle on Jersey. He was buried at Saint Saviour, Jersey on 18 October 1688.
