= Thomas Burman =

Thomas Burman may refer to:

- Thomas Burman (sculptor) (1618–1674), English sculptor
- Thomas R. Burman (born 1940), American make-up artist
- Tom Burman (born 1966), American athletics administrator
