= Montera =

Traditional hat of Spain and Portugal

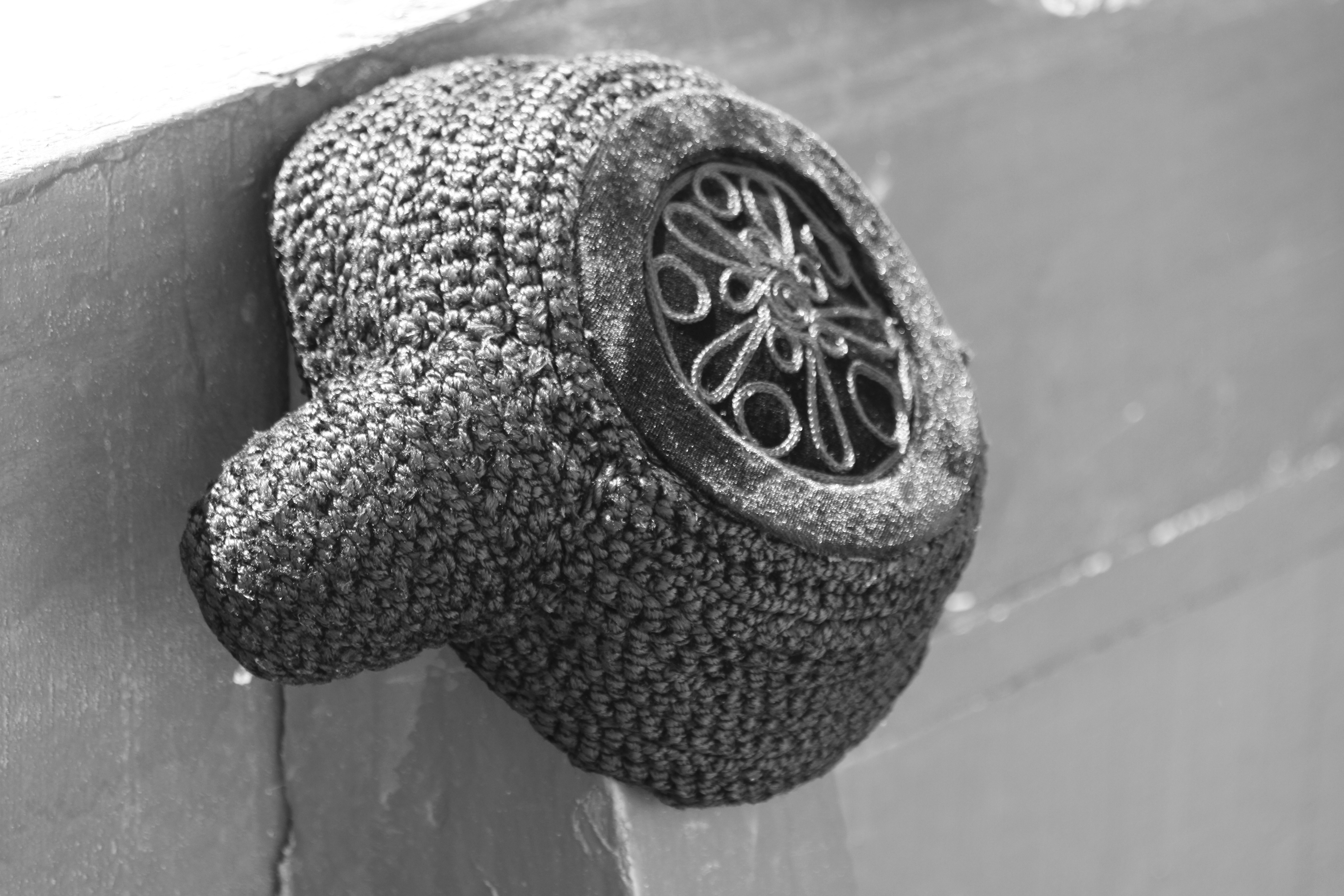
- Type: Hat
- Material: Covered in Astrakhan fur with an inner lining of velvet
- Place of origin: Spain

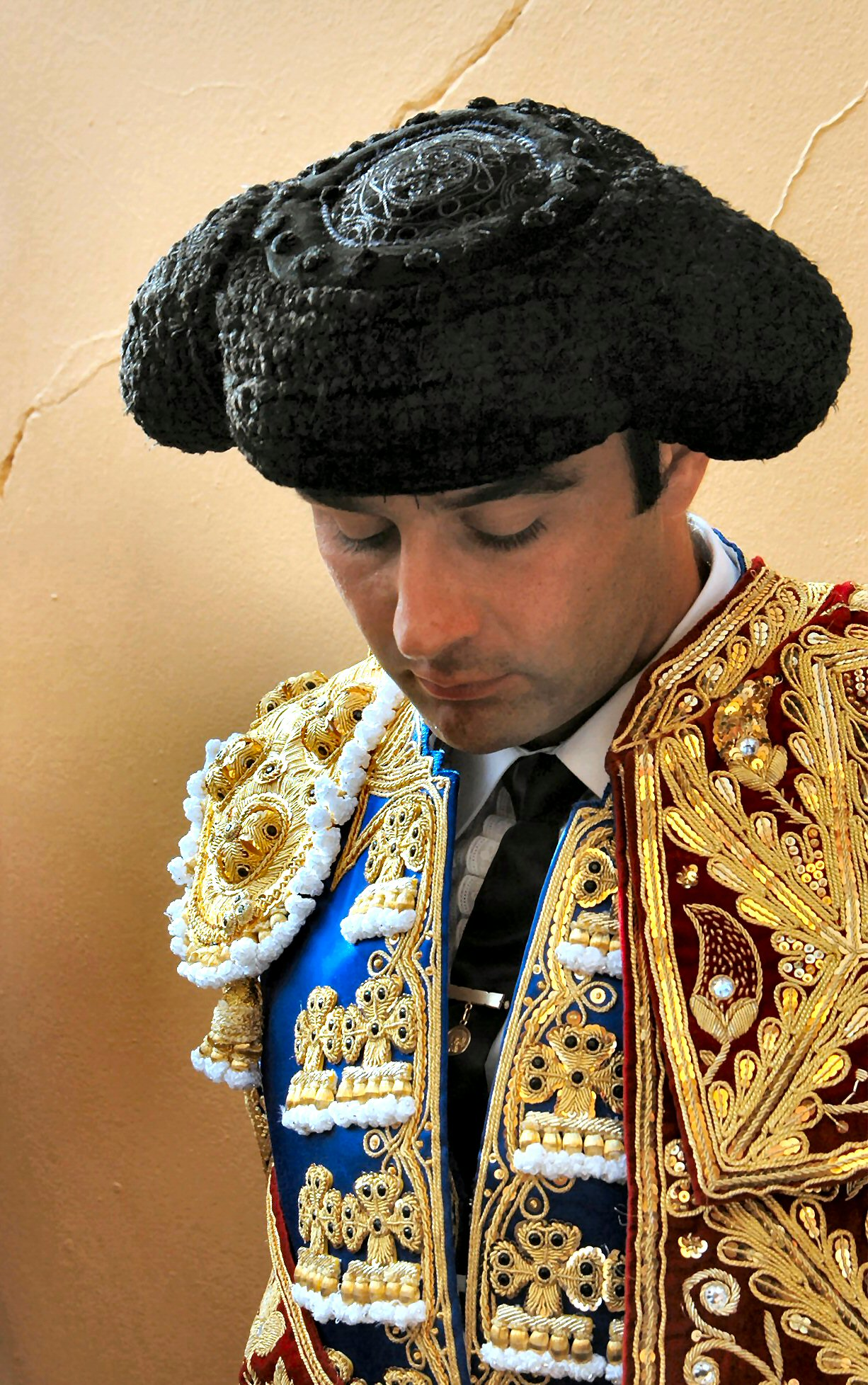
Enrique Ponce wearing a montera.

A montera is the cap traditionally worn by many males and females in the folk costumes of the Iberian Peninsula. It has come to name also but not exclusively the ones used by bullfighters, introduced to the event in 1835 by Francisco "Paquiro" Montes as accompaniment to the traje de luces, or "suit of lights".

The montera is typically covered in astrakhan fur with an inner lining of velvet. The image of a saint is sometimes printed on the lining as a talisman of good luck. The top of the montera is often decorated with a special design.

The "bulbs" on the sides of the montera represent the horns of a bull.

== See also ==
- List of hat styles
- Mounteere cap – Type of Spanish hunting cap
