= Woodcroft Castle =

Moated medieval castle in Etton, Cambridgeshire, England

- Cambridgeshire, England
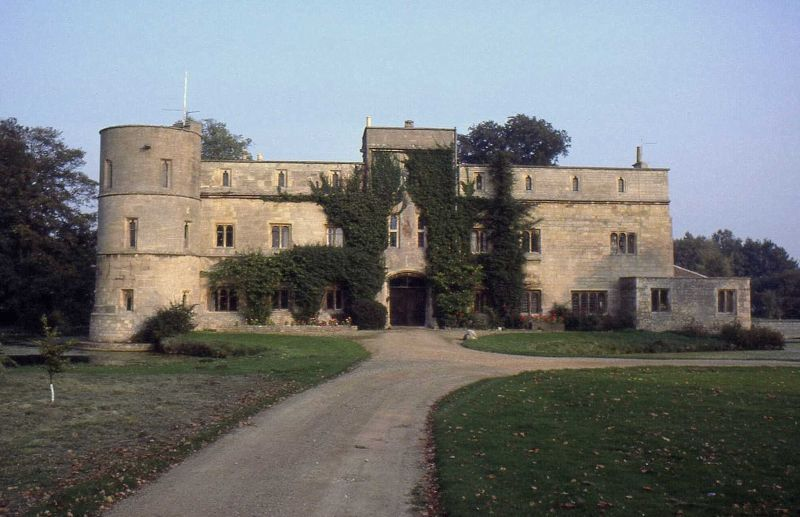
- Woodcroft Castle

Site information
- Type: Edwardian castle
- Open to the public: No

Location
- Shown within Cambridgeshire
- Location within Cambridgeshire
- Coordinates: 52.6263°N 0.3172°W
- Grid reference: grid reference TF140045

Site history
- Materials: Stone
- Events: The English Civil War

Woodcroft Castle is a moated medieval castle in the parish of Etton, Cambridgeshire, England.

== History ==
Woodcroft Castle was built at the end of the 13th century near the city of Peterborough in the Soke of Peterborough (now in Cambridgeshire). The medieval portions of the castle today include the front range, the circular tower, and the gatehouse. There is debate as to whether the castle originally followed a normal Edwardian quadrilateral design, of which most has since been lost, or if it was never completed. Early Tudor additions (late 1400s) retained these medieval elements in the current design.

Woodcroft Castle was briefly held by the Royalists during the Second English Civil War and was attacked and taken by Parliamentarian forces in June 1648. Michael Hudson, commander of the Royalist forces had attempted to raise forces for the King in Stamford but was cornered by Parliamentarian forces under Colonel Thomas Waite and took refuge in the castle, which belonged to William FitzWilliam, 2nd Baron FitzWilliam, a Parliamentarian supporter. The siege lasted less than 48 hours, and ended with the death of Hudson, when he refused to surrender the building, and again refused to surrender when trapped at the top of the main tower.

The castle is a Grade II* listed building and the 18th-century barn and stable range is Grade II. The castle is a private dwelling.

== See also ==
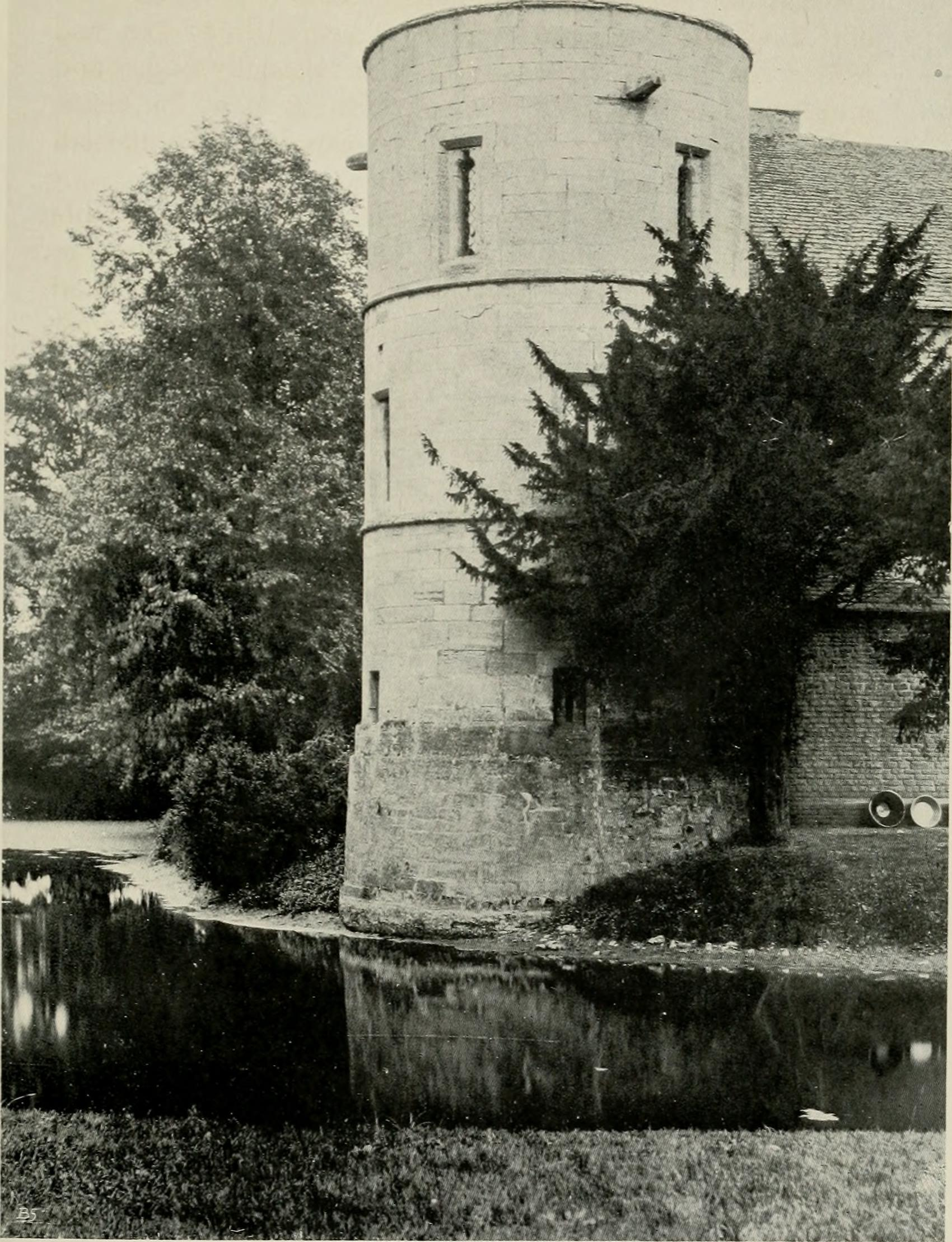
From Memorials of Old Northamptonshire (1903)

- Castles in Great Britain and Ireland
- List of castles in England

== Bibliography ==
- Pettifer, Adrian. (2002) English Castles: a Guide by Counties. Woodbridge, UK: Boydell Press. ISBN 978-0-85115-782-5.
