= Etton, Cambridgeshire =

Village in Cambridgeshire, England

Coordinates: 52.6441°N 0.3235°W

Etton
- Location within Cambridgeshire
- Population: 158
- OS grid reference: TF1306
- Unitary authority: Peterborough
- Ceremonial county: Cambridgeshire
- Region: East
- Country: England
- Sovereign state: United Kingdom
- Post town: Peterborough
- Postcode district: PE6
- Dialling code: 01733
- Police: Cambridgeshire
- Fire: Cambridgeshire
- Ambulance: East of England
- UK Parliament: North West Cambridgeshire

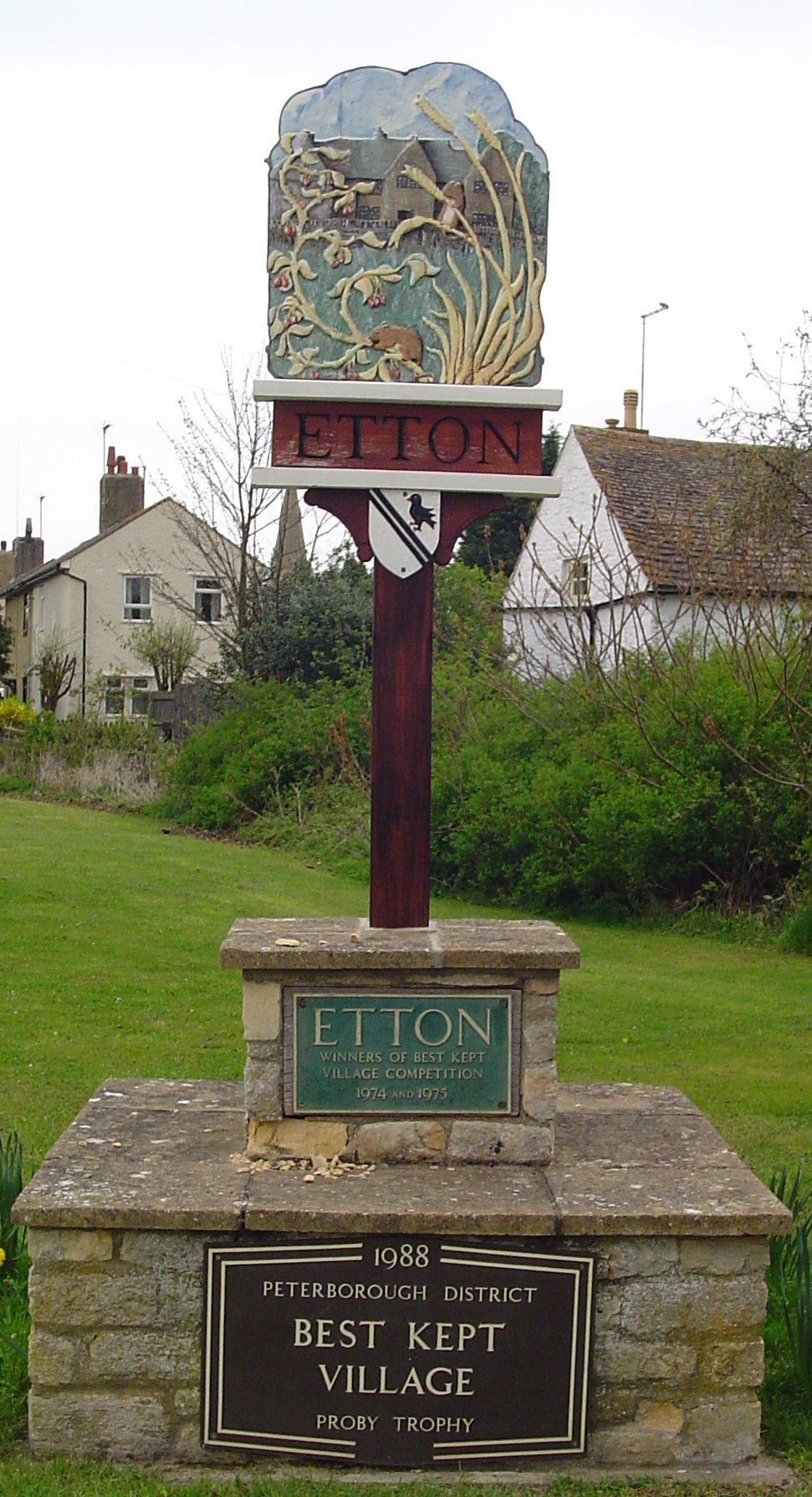
Signpost in Etton

Etton is a village and civil parish in the unitary authority area of the city of Peterborough, Cambridgeshire, in England. For electoral purposes it forms part of Northborough ward in North West Cambridgeshire constituency. The parish had a population of 158 persons and 58 households in 2001.

Woodcroft is a deserted medieval village and site of Woodcroft Castle.

== History ==
A mysterious Neolithic settlement at Etton Woodgate was excavated by Francis Pryor in 1982. He reported that the site was in two halves, with each working building on one side mirrored by an unused 'ritual' copy on the other.

Woodcroft Castle was built and moated about 1280. The medieval west range and corner tower survive along with an early Tudor (late 1400s) north wing. During the civil war it fell to Parliamentary troops in 1648.

Peterborough Corporation Waterworks opened here in 1907 "to augment the supply of water to the City of Peterborough."

== Sources ==
- East Anglian Archaeology report No.109, 2005: Archaeology and Environment of the Etton Landscape, by Charles French and Francis Pryor, Oxbow Books; ISBN 0-9520616-2-7
