= Committee of Both Kingdoms =

English and Scottish Parliamentarian body (1643–47)

The Committee of Both Kingdoms (known as the Derby House Committee from late 1647) was a committee set up during the Wars of the Three Kingdoms by the Parliamentarian faction in association with representatives from the Scottish Covenanters, after they made an alliance (the Solemn League and Covenant) in late 1643.

When the Scottish army entered England by invitation of the English Parliament in January 1644 the Parliamentary Committee of Safety was replaced by an ad hoc committee representative of both kingdoms which, by Parliamentary ordinance of 16 February, was formally constituted as the Committee of Both Kingdoms. The English contingent consisted of seven peers and 14 commoners. Its object was the management of peace overtures to, or making war on, the King. It was conveniently known as the Derby House Committee from 1647, when the Scots withdrew. Its influence long reduced by the growth of the army's, it was dissolved by Parliament on 7 February 1649 (soon after the execution of Charles I on 30 January) and replaced by the Council of State.

A sub-committee on Irish affairs met from 1646 to 1648. The sub-committee spent in Ireland money raised by the Committee of Both Houses.

== Creation ==
On 9 January 1644 the Estates of Scotland sitting in Edinburgh arranged for a special commission to go to London with full powers to represent them. The special commission had four members:

- Earl of Loudoun—High Chancellor of Scotland
- Lord Maitland—already in London as Scottish Commissioner to the Westminster Assembly
- Lord Warriston—due in London as a Commissioner to the Westminster Assembly
- Robert Barclay—Provost of Irvine in Ayrshire.

The four Scottish commissioners presented their commission from the Estates of Scotland to the English Parliament on 5 February. On 16 February, so that the two kingdoms should be "joined in their counsels as well as in their forces", the English Parliament passed an ordinance (Ordinance concerning the Committee of both Kingdoms) to form a joint "Committee of the Two Kingdoms" to sit with the four Scottish commissioners. The ordinance named seven members from the House of Lords and fourteen from the House of Commons to sit on the committee and ordained that six were to be a quorum, always in the proportion of one member of the House of Lords to two of the House of Commons, and of the Scottish commissioners meeting with them two were to be a quorum.

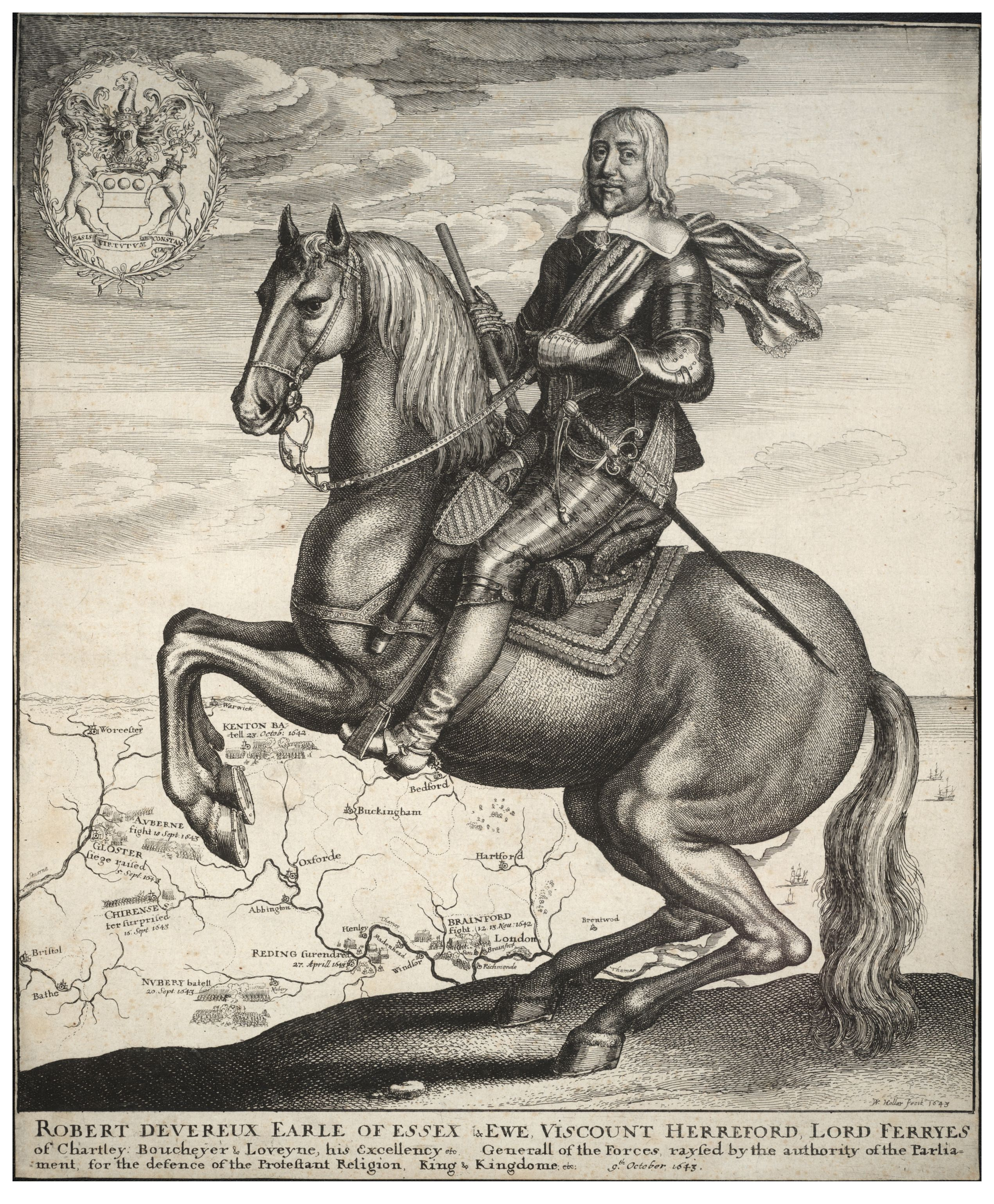
The Earl of Essex (1591–1646), Parliamentarian commander from 1642 to 1645

The seven members appointed from among the House of Lords were:

- Algernon, Earl of Northumberland (1602–1668), one of the "peace lords", in 1642 he was dismissed as Lord High Admiral and in 1643 headed the Parliamentary delegation to negotiate with the King at Oxford.
- Robert, Earl of Essex (1591–1646), in 1642 became the first captain-general of the Parliamentary army, but was overshadowed by the ascendancy of Oliver Cromwell and resigned in 1646, dying later the same year.
- Robert, Earl of Warwick (1587–1658), from 1642 Lord High Admiral, appointed by Parliament. In 1648, he captured the castles of Walmer, Deal, and Sandown for Parliament.
- Edward, Earl of Manchester (1602–1671), in August 1643 was appointed major-general of the Parliamentary forces in the east, with Cromwell as his deputy; he was in command at Marston Moor, but later fell out with Cromwell, and in November 1644 opposed continuing the war.
- William, Viscount Saye and Sele (1582–1662), was mainly responsible for passing the Self-denying Ordinance through the House of Lords; and by 1648 wanted a negotiated settlement with the King; he retired into private life after Charles's execution.
- Philip, Lord Wharton (1613–1696), a Puritan and a favourite of Oliver Cromwell, was one of the youngest members of the committee.
- John, Lord Roberts (1606–1685), with the Self-denying Ordinance of April 1645 he lost his command in Plymouth and was sidelined. Shocked by the execution of the King, he withdrew from public life, but after the Restoration he became Lord Privy Seal and later Lord Lieutenant of Ireland.

The fourteen members appointed from the House of Commons were:

- William Pierrepoint (c. 1607–1678), a Member of Parliament for Great Wenlock, represented Parliament in negotiations with the King at Oxford in 1643 and at Uxbridge in 1645
- Henry Vane the Elder (1589–1655), a former Secretary of State and a member for Wilton
- Sir Philip Stapleton (1603–1647), a colonel of horse who commanded the Earl of Essex's bodyguard and a brigade of cavalry at the Battle of Edgehill, a member for Boroughbridge
- Sir William Waller (c. 1597–1668), a strict Presbyterian and a major-general of the parliamentary forces, one of the members for Andover
- Sir Gilbert Gerard (1587–1670), a member for Middlesex, paymaster of the Parliamentary army and from 1648 to 1649 Chancellor of the Duchy of Lancaster
- Sir William Airmine (1593–1651), a member for Grantham, later a member of the Council of State
- Sir Arthur Haselrig (1601–1661), a knight of the shire for Leicestershire; following the Stuart Restoration, he was imprisoned in the Tower of London and died there.
- Henry Vane the Younger (1613–1662), a member for Kingston upon Hull; although he took no part in the regicide, in 1662 he was charged with high treason and beheaded
- John Crew (1598–1679), a member for Brackley and a Justice of the Peace, was later created Baron Crew by King Charles II
- Robert Wallop (1601–1667), a member for Andover, was later one of the Commissioners who sat in judgment at the trial of Charles I
- Oliver St John (c. 1598–1673), a barrister and judge who was married to a cousin of Oliver Cromwell; he was a member for Totnes and became Solicitor General
- Oliver Cromwell (1599–1658), a member for Cambridge, later Lord Protector
- Samuel Browne (c. 1598–1668), a member for Clifton, Dartmouth and Hardness
- Serjeant John Glynne (1602–1666), a member for Westminster and Recorder of London

David Masson states that the Earl of Essex, the Lord General, was opposed to the formation of the committee as it was constituted because "there can be no doubt that the object was that the management of the war should be less in Essex's hands than it had been".

== Administration ==
The committee met in Derby House at three o'clock every day of the week—including Sundays. Attendance in 1644 was patchy, since before the enactment of the Self-denying Ordinance, many members of the committee had commands in the field. Warwick, for example, was the Lord High Admiral. The more active and influential members on the committee were Lord Wharton and Henry Vane the Younger, and Lord Warriston for the Scots.

The committee had to accommodate several factions within its ranks and jealousies and personal animosities between some of its members, such as Waller and Essex. It was also subject to control by Parliament (though the need to pass legislation or resolutions through both Houses meant that the committee could control matters day-by-day without much interference).

Its greatest achievement was the establishment of the New Model Army, and the maintenance of this army and other forces in the field until King Charles was defeated in 1646. The committee provided a continuity of policy and administration which the King could not match.

== Dissolution ==
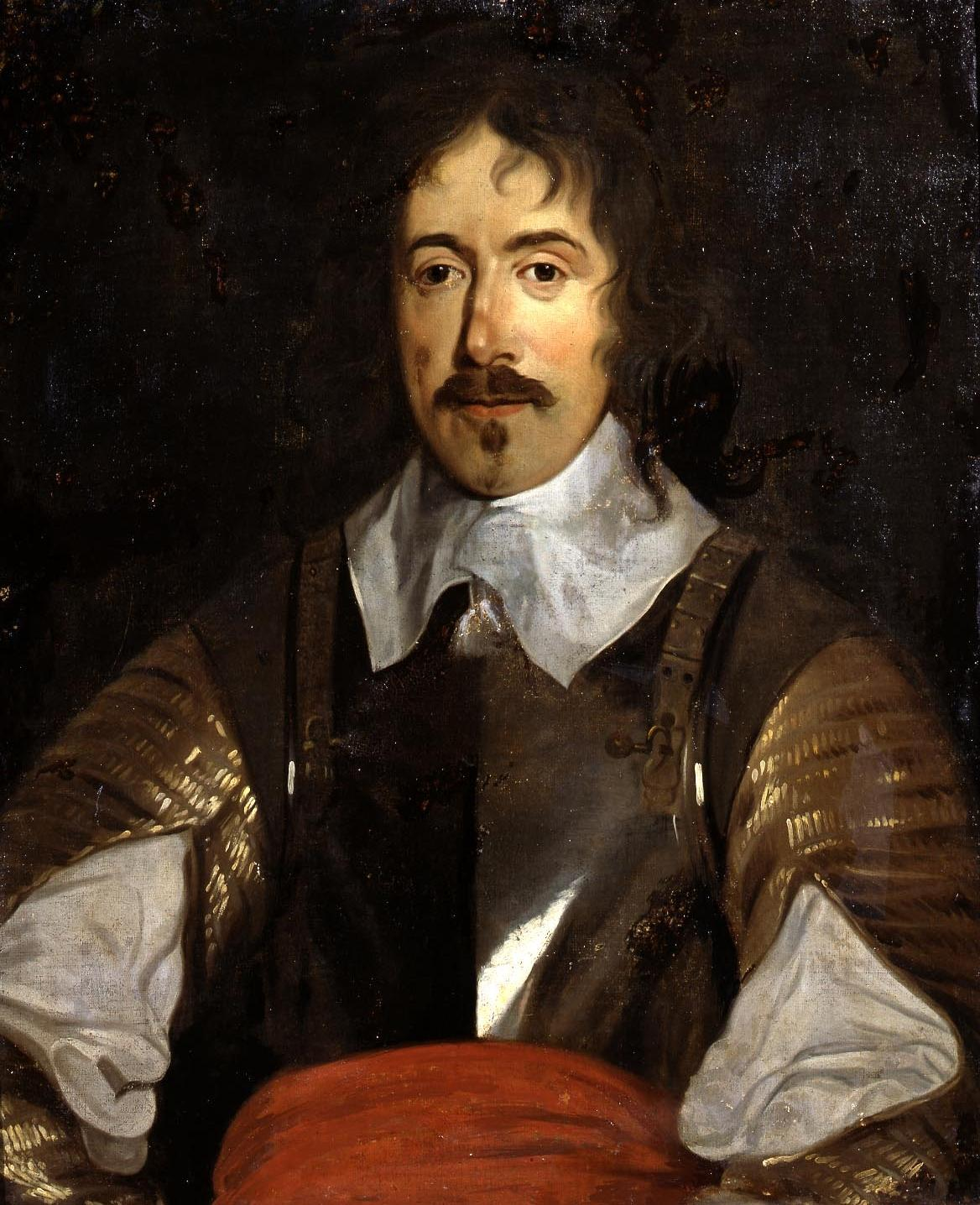
Denzil Holles, leader of the English Presbyterian moderates who dominated the Derby House Committee post January 1647

On 27 April 1646, Charles left Oxford and surrendered to the Covenanter army outside Newark. A few days later, they withdrew north to Newcastle, taking the King with them, despite the furious objections of the English. In July, the committee presented Charles with the Newcastle Propositions, which included his acceptance of a Presbyterian union between the kingdoms. Once Charles rejected the terms, it left the Covenanters in a difficult position; keeping him was too dangerous, since many Scots, regardless of political affiliation, wanted him restored to the throne. On 28 January 1647, they handed Charles over to Parliament in return for £400,000, and retreated into Scotland.

The committee was now dissolved but its English members continued to sit as the Derby House Committee, dominated by Holles and moderate MPs, many of whom were Presbyterian. Internal political conflict was exacerbated by economic crises caused by the war and a failed 1646 harvest. By March 1647, the New Model Army was owed more than £3 million in wages; led by Holles, Parliament ordered it to Ireland, stating only those who agreed to go would be paid. When regimental representatives or Agitators supported by the Army Council demanded full payment for all in advance, it was disbanded but the army refused to comply.

In response, Holles and his allies formed a new Committee of Safety and attempted to raise a new army commanded by Edward Massie. On 21 July, eight peers and 57 Independent MPs left London and took refuge with the New Model Army; on 6 August, the army occupied the city, dissolved the committee and issued a list of Eleven Members whom they wanted removed from Parliament.

== Sources ==
- Arnold-Baker, Charles (1996). The Companion to British History (2015 ed.). Routledge. ISBN 978-1138928831.
- Carlyle, Thomas (1897). "Letters I (1) to LXXXVI (86)". Oliver Cromwell's letters and speeches: with elucidations. Vol. 1. London: Chapman and Hall. p. 202.
- Firth, C.H.; Rait, R.S., eds. (1911). "February 1644: An Ordinance for the appointing a Committee of both Houses of Parliament, to join with the Committees and Commissioners of Scotland, for the better managing the Affairs of both Nations, in the common Cause, according to the Ends expressed in the late Covenant and Treaty between the Two Nations of England and Scotland". Acts and Ordinances of the Interregnum, 1642–1660. pp. 381, 382.
- Kennedy, DE (2000). The English Revolution, 1642–1649 (revised ed.). Palgrave Macmillan. ISBN 0-312-23063-X.
- Masson, David (1873). The life of John Milton: narrated in connexion with the political, ecclesiastical, and literary history of his time. Vol. 3. MacMillan & Company. pp. 40, 41.
- Manganiello, Stephen (2004). The Concise Encyclopedia of the Revolutions and Wars of England, Scotland, and Ireland, 1639–1660. Scarecrow Press. ISBN 978-0810851009.
- Murdoch, Steve (2003). Britain, Denmark-Norway and the House of Stuart. East Linton.
- Rees, John (2016). The Leveller Revolution. Verso. ISBN 978-1784783907.
- Royle, Trevor (2004). Civil War: The Wars of the Three Kingdoms 1638–1660. Abacus. ISBN 978-0-349-11564-1.
- Wedgwood, C.V. (1958). The King's War, 1641–1647 (1983 ed.). Penguin Classics. ISBN 978-0-14-006991-4.
- Young, Peter; Holmes, Richard (2000). The English Civil War. Wordsworth Editions. ISBN 1-84022-222-0.

Attribution

- This article incorporates text published under the British Open Government Licence: National Archives (12 August 2009). "Committee of Both Kingdoms ("Derby House Committee"): Books".
