= John Ashburnham (Royalist) =

English courtier, diplomat and politician (1603–1671)

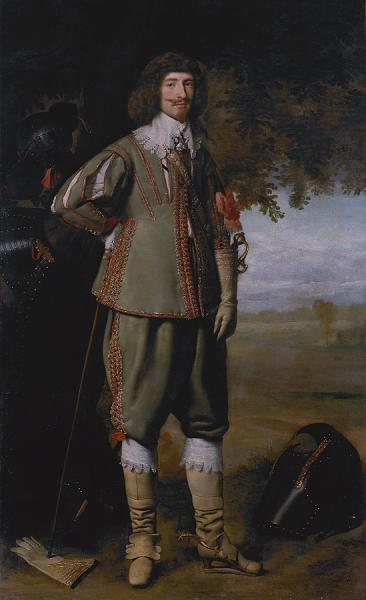
John Ashburnham around 1630, portrait by Daniel Mytens.

John Ashburnham (1603 – 15 June 1671) was an English courtier, diplomat and politician who sat in the House of Commons at various times between 1640 and 1667. He supported the Royalist cause in the English Civil War and was an attendant on the King.

== Background ==
Ashburnham was the eldest son of Sir John Ashburnham by Elizabeth, daughter of Sir Thomas Beaumont. His father was a wastrel and died in 1620, but his mother was related to Lady Villiers, mother of George Villiers, 1st Duke of Buckingham. Under Buckingham's patronage Ashburnham became well known to the king Charles I, who styled him "Jack Ashburnham" in his letters. In 1628 Ashburnham became groom of the bedchamber.

Ashburnham became wealthy and lent money to the king: in 1638 the Star-chamber fine on Sir Walter Long, 1st Baronet and his brother, was assigned to Ashburnham. The next year a warrant under the privy seal enabled him to regain his ancestral estate of Ashburnham. He sat as a member of parliament for Hastings in the Long Parliament in 1640. As a partisan of the king, he began to absent himself, and he was proceeded against for contempt (6 May 1642). The king wrote a letter to the Commons in his justification but the house maintained its prior right to the obedience of its member. Ashburnham was 'discharged and disabled' (5 February 1643), and his estate was sequestrated (14 September).

== Civil War ==
Ashburnham was a faithful adherent and attendant to Charles I in the First English Civil War, and became the treasurer and paymaster of the king's army. His name occurs in seven negotiations for peace. He was one of the commissioners at the Treaty of Uxbridge (1644), and one of the four appointed to lay the king's proposals before parliament (December 1645). When Thomas Fairfax prepared to besiege Oxford, and Charles determined upon flight, Ashburnham and Michael Hudson were the sole attendants to the king in his journey from Oxford to the Scottish camp outside Newark-on-Trent. Hudson was released, and Ashburnham was positively commanded by the king to flee before confirmation of the order to send him up to London as a delinquent could be received. He made his way safely to Holland, and thence to Queen Henrietta Maria at Paris.

In 1647 the army had the king in custody at Holmby, and allowed him his choice of servants. Ashburnham resumed his attendance on his master at Hampton Court, where Charles was in constant fear of assassination. At Ashburnham's suggestion he made proposals to the Scottish commissioners for his sudden journey to London and personal treaty with the parliament. But the arrangement fell through. Charles was then impatient to be gone, commanded Ashburnham and his other confidants, Sir John Berkeley and William Legge, to propose some place for him to go to. Ashburnham mentioned Sir John Oglander's house in the Isle of Wight as a place where the king might be concealed. The plan was to sound out the governor of the island, Colonel Robert Hammond. If Hammond were not to be trusted, the fugitive Charles could secretly take ship for France. In the end Berkeley revealed the hiding-place to Hammond; Charles refused the desperate offer of Ashburnham to kill Hammond, and again became virtually a prisoner.

== Commonwealth period ==
Subsequently, the Commonwealth authorities detained Ashburnham in the Tower of London and three times banished him to the Channel Islands. Ashburnham was parted from his master Charles by order of the parliament, 1 January 1648, was imprisoned in Windsor Castle (May), and when the Second English Civil War broke out was exchanged for Sir William Masham. He was not allowed to attend the king during the Treaty of Newport (August), and was included among the delinquents who were to expect no pardon (13 October). He was constantly harassed. He had acquired an estate by his second marriage with the Dowager Lady Poulett (1649) (Widow of John Poulett, 1st Baron Poulett), and Charles II gave him permission to stay in England to preserve it. Royalists, however, suspected his fidelity, and (March 1650) in a memorial to the king asked whether they might trust him. He was sued for debts contracted for the late Charles I. He was forced to compound for one half of his estate, was bound in heavy securities to appear, when required, before the council of state, and his private journeys were licensed by a pass from the council. For three years he was asked by committees to discover who had lent the king money during the wars. His three banishments to Guernsey Castle were for sending money to the king.

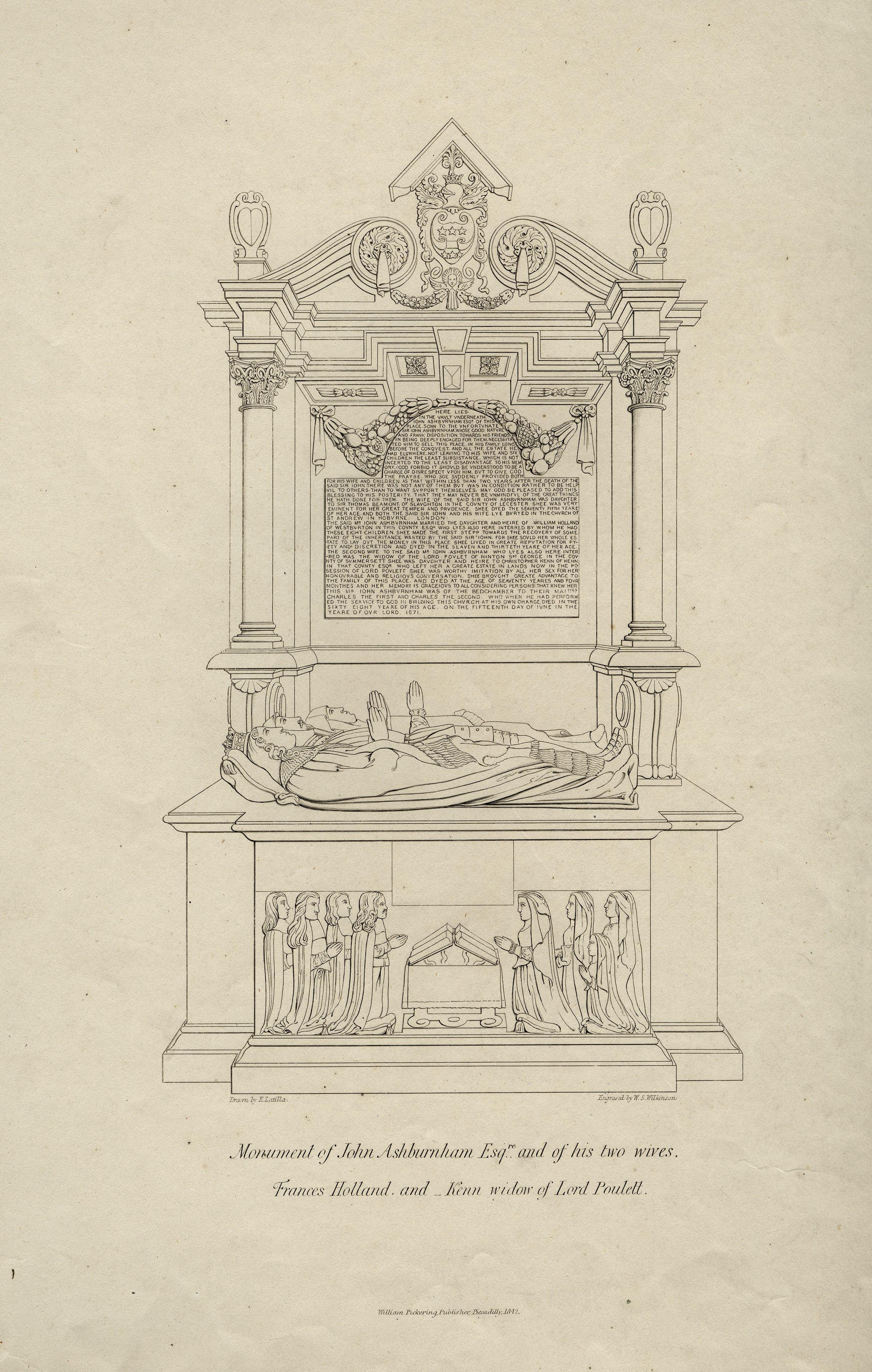
Monument to John Ashburnham and his two wives by Thomas Burman

== 1660 Restoration ==
After the Restoration Ashburnham served Charles II as a diplomat; and he was member of parliament for Sussex between 1661 and 1667 in the Cavalier Parliament. In September 1661, he was the head of a commission to inquire into the abuses in the post office. His house at Chiswick, with its contents, was purchased by the king for the Duke of Monmouth, of whom (January 1665) he was made one of the guardians. His loans to Charles I were paid by grants of crown leases. He and his brother William Ashburnham shared in an enterprise for reviving the manufacture of tapestry at the Mortlake Tapestry Works (March and April 1667).

His large memorial tomb by Thomas Burman stands in St Peter's Church in Ashburnham, East Sussex.

== Family ==
Ashburnham and his first wife Frances, daughter and heiress of William Holland of West Burton, Sussex, had eight children. His second wife was the widow of Lord Poulet of Hinton St. George.

Ashburnham's daughter Elizabeth married Sir Hugh Smith, 1st Baronet of Long Ashton. His grandson John was ennobled as Baron Ashburnham in 1689, and his great-grandson as Earl of Ashburnham, a title that became extinct in 1924.

== Notes ==
Parliament of England
Preceded by Henry Goring; Sir John Pelham	Member of Parliament for Sussex; 1661–1667; With: Sir John Pelham	Succeeded by Sir William Morley; Sir John Pelham
