= Thomas Burman (sculptor) =

English sculptor (1618–1674)

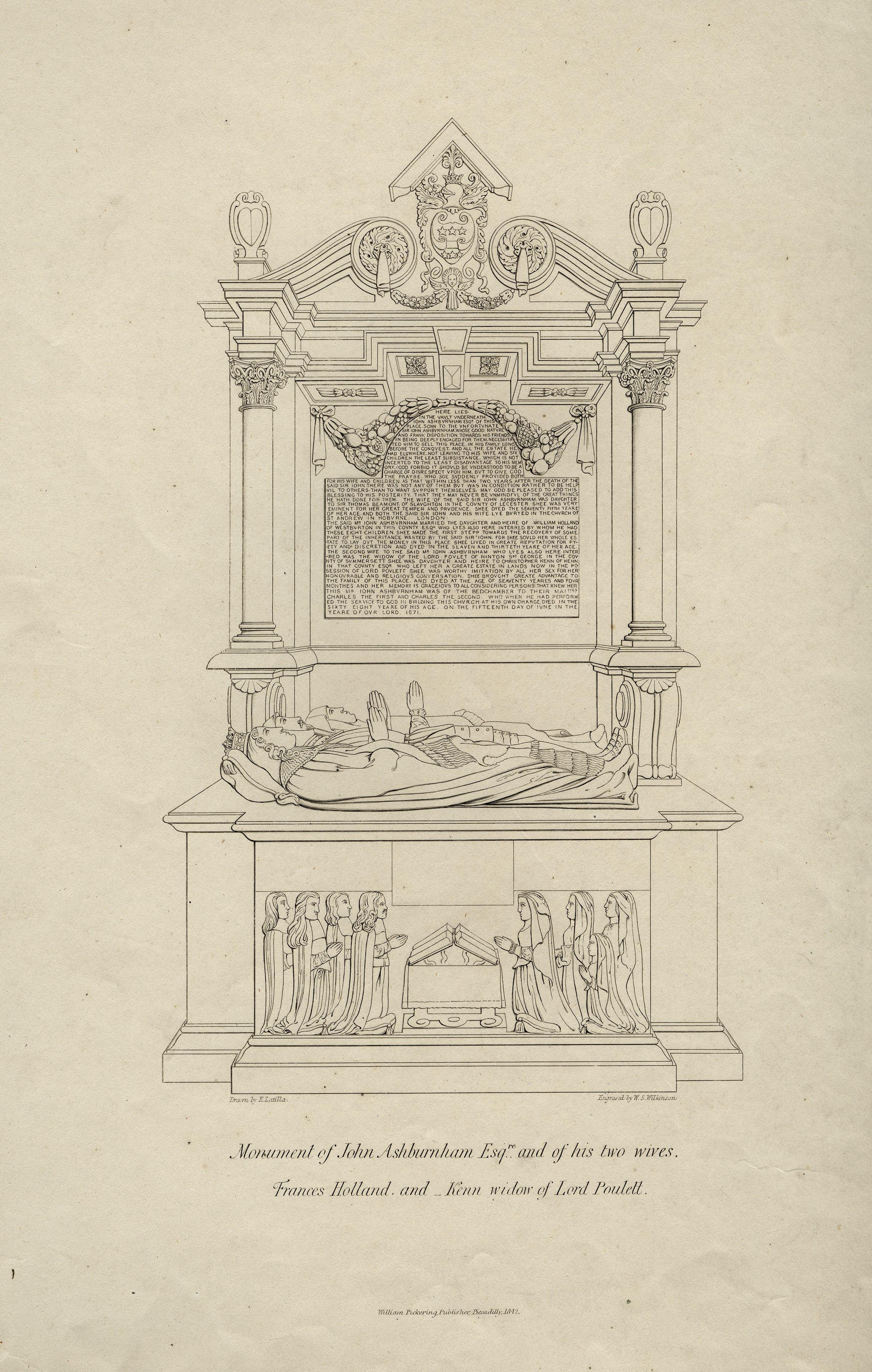
Monument to John Ashburnham and his two wives in Ashburnham

Thomas Burman (1618–1674) was a 17th century English sculptor based in London.

== Life ==
Born in London in 1618 of Jewish parentage he was indentured as a bound apprentice to mason and sculptor Edward Marshall in 1633. He began working independently around 1640.

Around 1650 he took on John Bushnell as an apprentice who proved a worthy student. Andre Charles Boulle also studied under him.

He died on 17 March 1674 in the parish of St Martin's and is buried in the churchyard of St Paul's in Covent Garden in central London.

== Family ==
He was married to Rebekeh (Rebecca). They had a son Balthasar Burman who was also a sculptor - his most notable work being the tomb of Bishop Brian Duppa in Westminster Abbey.

== Known works ==
- Statue of Anna Talbot, Countess of Shrewsbury (1671) at St. John's College, Cambridge
- Fireplace for Sir Robert Clayton's banking house (1671) in Old Jewry
- Memorial to John Dutton in Church of St Mary Magdalene in Sherborne
- Memorial to Mrs and Rev Beale (1672) at Walton, Buckinghamshire
- Memorial to John Ashburnham (1672) in the parish church of Ashburnham, East Sussex
