= William Ashburnham (Royalist) =

English army officer, landowner and MP

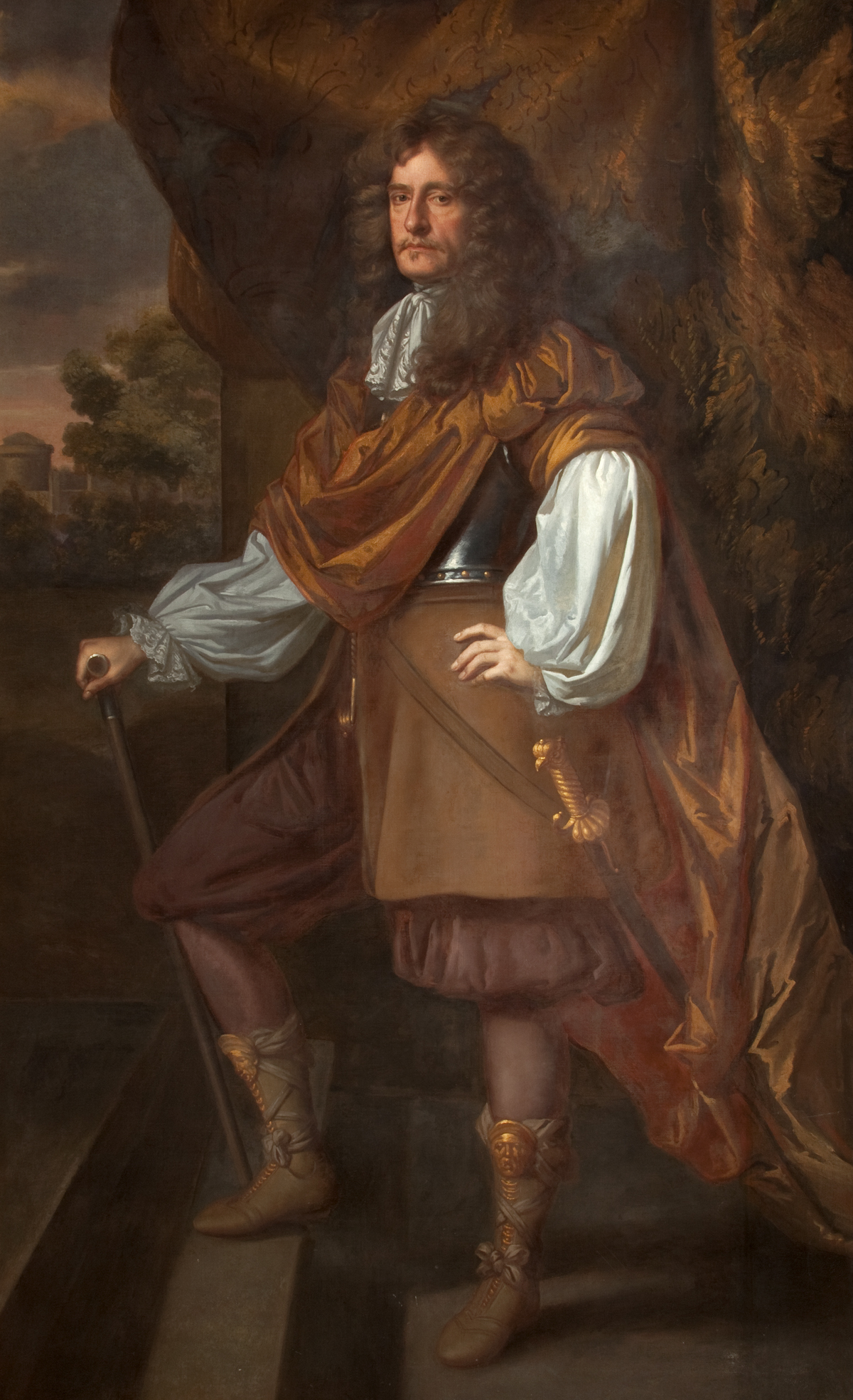
- portrait by Peter Lely
- Born: 1604
- Died: 1679 (aged 74–75)
- Occupation: Politician
- Spouse(s): Jane Boteler
- Parent(s): Sir John Ashburnham; Elizabeth Richardson, 1st Lady Cramond
- Family: John Ashburnham
- Position held: Member of the April 1640 Parliament, Member of the 1661-79 Parliament
- Rank: major general

William Ashburnham (c. 1604–1679) was an English army officer, landowner and MP.

== Biography ==
William Ashburnham was the younger brother of John Ashburnham, who was also an MP.

He was returned as MP for Ludgershall in both the parliaments held in 1640 but was expelled from the Long Parliament on 9 December 1641 for his part in the Army Plots of that year.

He fought as an officer for the Royalist cause in the Civil War and in 1644 was governor of Weymouth, a place he kept four months for King Charles. Ten years later, on 3 June 1654, he was arrested and examined on the charge of complicity in the plot to murder the Protector Oliver Cromwell for which Gerard and Vowel afterwards suffered. He does not, however, appear to have been sent before the high court of justice.

After the Restoration of the monarchy he was made cofferer of the royal household. He was frequently a fellow-guest and a sharer in treasury business with Pepys, who styles him an "experienced man and a cavalier". His "odd stories" are duly noted, and there was one touching the lease of Ashburnham House from the dean and chapter of Westminster, wherein the "devilish covetousness" of Dr. Busby was commemorated. He was returned again as MP for Ludgershall from 1661 until his death in 1679.

Ashburnham had married a wealthy widow, Jane, daughter of John Boteler, 1st Baron Boteler of Brantfield and the widow of James Ley, 1st Earl of Marlborough who had died in 1629; she brought landholdings including an estate at Tidworth, near Ludgershall. Jane predeceased him in 1672.

His estate, which included Mountfield manor in Sussex and Ampthill Park in Bedfordshire, was inherited by his great-nephew John Ashburnham, MP for Hastings and later created Baron Ashburnham.
