= Michael Hudson (Royalist) =

English clergyman and Royalist

Michael Hudson (1605–1648) was an English clergyman who supported the Royalist cause during the English Civil War.

In 1628 Hudson graduated from Queen's College, Oxford with an M.A., and became fellow c. 1630. King Charles I gave him various livings; and he was one of the king's chaplains at Oxford. He was scoutmaster to the northern army (1643–1644) and, along with John Ashburnham, accompanied Charles I to Newark in 1646. At the end of the First English Civil War he was imprisoned. He escaped from prison, but was again captured, 1647, and sent to the Tower of London. In 1648 he escaped again, and promoted a Royalist rising in the eastern counties where he was killed while defending Woodcroft Castle.

== Biography ==
Hudson was born in Westmoreland in 1605, and in February 1622 became a "poor child" and subsequently tabarder of Queen's College, Oxford. He proceeded B.A. in February 1625, and M.A. in January 1628. It seems doubtful that he is identical with the Michael Hudson who matriculated from Corpus Christi College, Cambridge, 3 July 1623.

About 1630 he was elected a fellow of Queen's College, Oxford, married, and was for a time tutor to Charles, Prince of Wales (later Charles II). He was ordained as a priest in 1632 by John Bancroft, Bishop of Oxford.

He was rector of Uffington, Lincolnshire, and of Market Bosworth, Leicestershire, but seems to have assigned the former on 19 March 1641 to Thomas South in exchange for the rectory of King's Cliffe, Northamptonshire. Both South and Hudson were sequestrated from the living of Uffington by the Parliamentarian general Edward Montagu, Earl of Manchester 31 December 1644. On 20 January 1645 he was ejected by the Earl of Manchester from the living at Uffington, on the evidence of four witnesses.

On the outbreak of the English Civil War Hudson had joined the Royalists (Cavaliers), and after the Battle of Edgehill (23 October 1642) retired to Oxford, where he was brought into contact with the king, was made one of the royal chaplains, and received a Doctor of Divinity (D.D.) in February 1643. His want of reserve and bluntness caused Charles I to nickname him his plain-dealing chaplain.

Hudson's known fidelity led to his appointment as scout-master to the army in the northern parts of England, then under the command of the Marquis of Newcastle, a position which he occupied till 1644. In April 1646, when Charles I determined to entrust his person to the Scots army, he chose Hudson and John Ashburnham to conduct him to the Scottish army camp at Newark-on-Trent. Parliament, on 23 May 1646, consequently despatched a serjeant-at-arms for his arrest, but the Scots refused to give him up, and after a few days' confinement released him. Shortly afterwards, while endeavouring to reach France, he was arrested at Sandwich, Kent (7 June 1646) and was imprisoned in London House.

On 18 June 1646 Hudson was examined by a committee of Parliament, when he detailed the wanderings of the king between Oxford and the Scots camp, On 18 November he escaped, and is said, to have conveyed letters from the king to Major-general Rowland Laugharne in Wales. In the following January he was again captured at Hull and was imprisoned in the Tower of London, where he was not allowed to see any one except in the presence of a keeper. Here he chiefly employed himself in writing and in perfecting a project to deliver the Tower into royalist hands, which he was unable to put into execution. He again escaped early in 1648 in disguise with a basket of apples on his head.

Hudson returned to Lincolnshire where he raised a party of Royalist horse (cavalry) and stirred up the gentry of Norfolk and Suffolk to more activity on the King's side. With the chief body of those who had taken arms under his command, Hudson retired to Woodcroft Castle in the Soke of Peterborough, a strong building surrounded by a moat, where they were speedily attacked by a body of parliamentary soldiery. Hudson, who is believed to have borne a commission as a colonel, defended the house with great courage, and when the doors were forced, went with the remnant of his followers to the battlements, and only yielded on promise of quarter, which was afterwards refused. Hudson was flung over the battlements, but managed to support himself upon a spout or projecting stone until his hands were cut off, when he fell into the moat. In reply to his request to be allowed to die on land, a man, named Egborough, knocked him on the head with a musket (6 June 1648), while another parliamentarian cut out his tongue and carried it about as a trophy. His body was buried at Denton, Northamptonshire. A proposal to reinter it at Uffington does not seem to have been carried out.

== Family ==
Hudson married in 1633 Elizabeth Pollard of Newnham Courtney, Oxfordshire. He lost by the rebellion the whole of his estates, and after his death his wife and children were supported by charity.

== Character ==
Augustus Charles Bickley, Hudson's biographer in the Dictionary of National Biography (1895) wrote "His boldness, generosity, and almost fanatical loyalty are undoubted". John Walker wrote he was a scholar and a plain and upright Christian.

== Works ==
Hudson wrote:

- The Divine Right of Government Natural and Politique, more particularly of Monarchie, the onely legitimate and Natural source of Politique Government, which was printed in 4to, 1647 (the book was written while Hudson was a prisoner in the Tower of London).
- An Account of King Charles I,..., 8vo, which was not published until 1731 (by Hearne).
