= Mounteere cap =

Type of Spanish hunting cap

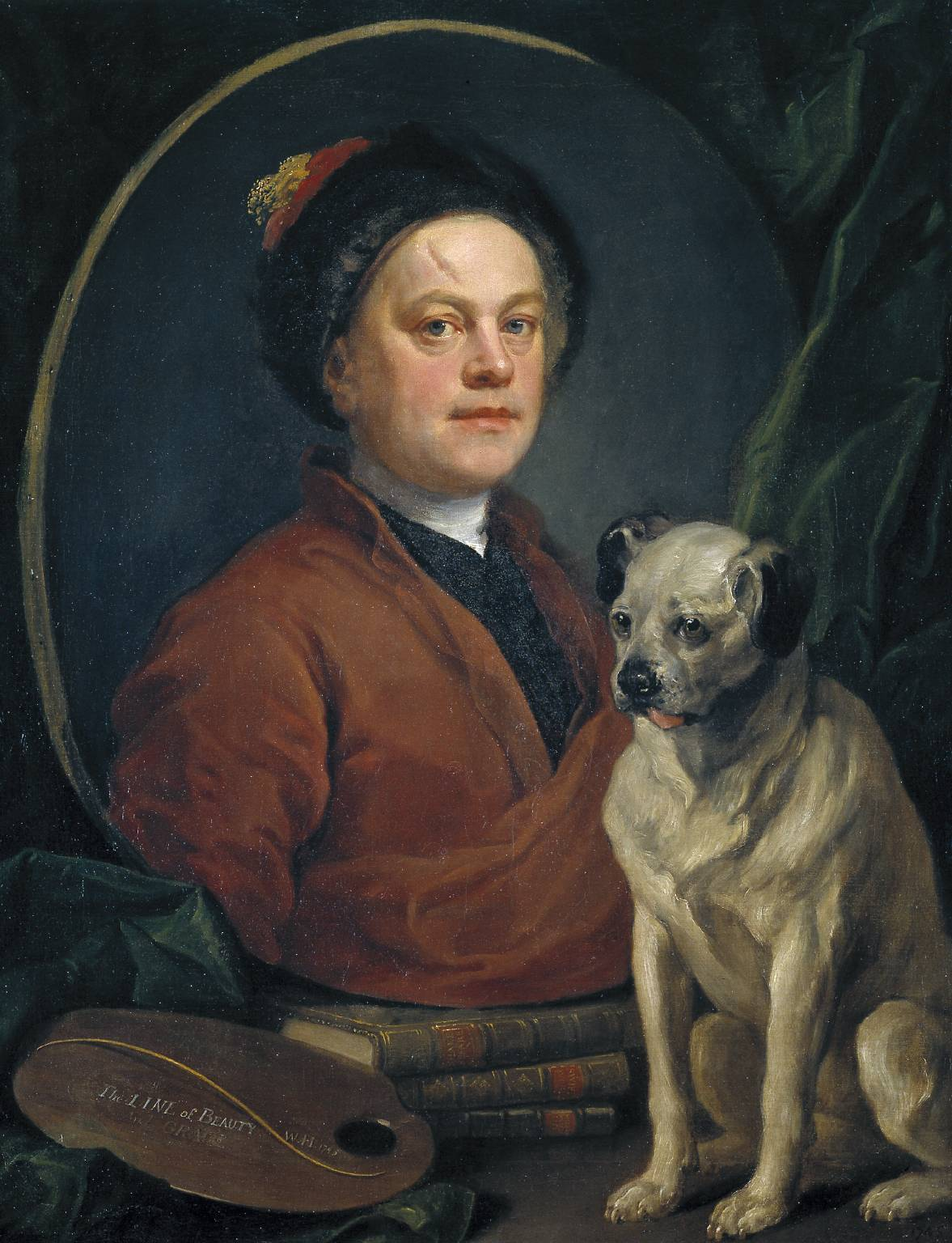
Self-portrait of William Hogarth with his dog Trump, 1745. He wears a Montero cap.

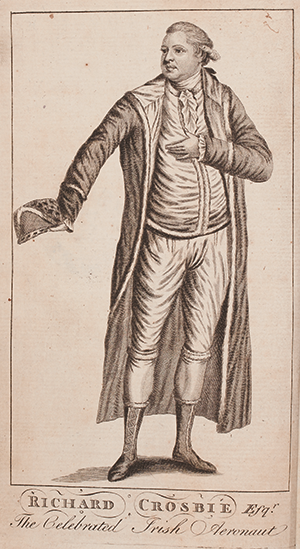
Richard Crosbie holds a leopard skin Montero hat, 1785.

Mounteere cap (also known as a Montero cap) is a type of cap formerly worn in Spain for hunting. It has a spherical crown and (frequently fur-lined) flaps able to be drawn down to protect the ears and neck.

== See also ==
- List of hat styles
- Montera – Traditional hat of Spain and Portugal
