= William Ashburnham =

William Ashburnham may refer to:

- William Ashburnham (Royalist) (c. 1604–1679), English Member of the Long Parliament
- Sir William Ashburnham, 2nd Baronet (1678–1755), British MP for Hastings 1710–1713, 1722–1741, for Seaford 1715–1717
- Sir William Ashburnham, 4th Baronet (1710–1797), his nephew, Bishop of Chichester
- Sir William Ashburnham, 5th Baronet (1739–1823), his son, British MP for Hastings 1761–1774
- William Ashburnham, 2nd Baron Ashburnham (1679–1710), English landowner and politician
