= Denny Ashburnham =

English landowner and politician (c.1628–1697)

Sir Denny Ashburnham, 1st Baronet (c.1628 – 11 December 1697) was an English landowner and politician who sat in the House of Commons at various times between 1660 and 1689.

== Background ==
Ashburnham was the eldest son of Lawrence Ashburnham of Broomham Park, Guestling, Sussex, and his second wife, Bridget Fleetwood, daughter of Sir George Fleetwood. His paternal grandfather was Adam Ashburnham, who sat in the Parliament of England.

== Career ==
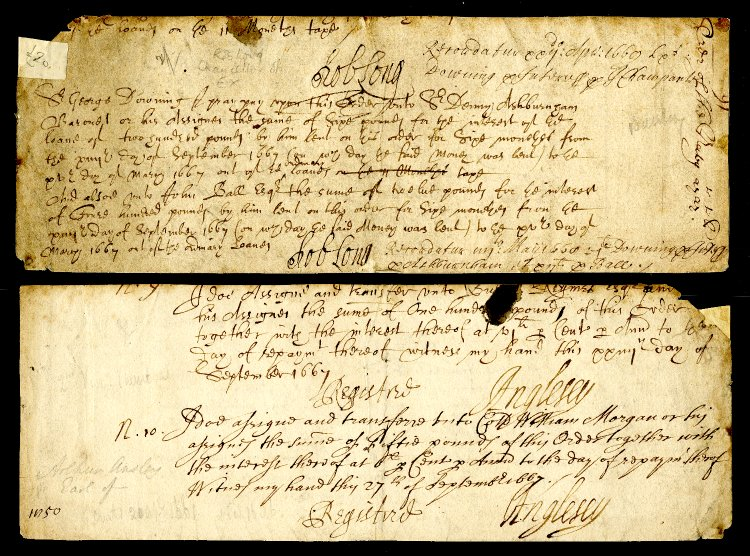
Letter from Sir Robert Long to Sir George Downing, instructing payment to Sir Denny Ashburnham of £6 interest on £200 lent. 1669

Ashburnham was a Commissioner for the Militia and became a Justice of the Peace for Sussex in March 1660. In April 1660, he was elected Member of Parliament (MP) for Hastings in the Convention Parliament. He was re-elected MP for Hastings in 1661 for the Cavalier Parliament. On 15 May 1661, he was created a baronet, of Bromham, in the County of Sussex. In 1665, Ashburnham was appointed a Commissioner of the Excise, a post he held for the next three years and again from 1688 until 1689. He became a Deputy Lieutenant for Sussex in 1670. He was a Victualler of the Navy in 1671 and also between 1673 and 1677. Ashburnham was several times a Commissioner for Assessment and between 1683 and 1689 served as Commissioner for Hearth-tax. In 1685, he was nominated mayor of Hastings.

In the aftermath of the so-called Popish Plot, Ashburnham was summoned in the trial of Titus Oates as a witness.

Ashburnham died at the age of about 68 and was buried at Guestling on 11 December 1697.

== Family ==
Ashburnham married firstly Frances Ashburnham, daughter of John Ashburnham and aunt of John Ashburnham, 1st Baron Ashburnham. After her death, he married Anne Watkins, daughter of Sir David Watkins on 14 September 1675. He had four sons and two daughters by his first wife and three sons and one daughter by his second wife. Ashburnham was buried at Guestling in Sussex and was succeeded in the baronetcy by his sons William and Charles successively.

== Arms ==
Coat of arms of Denny Ashburnham
Crest Out of a ducal coronet Or an ash tree Proper Escutcheon Gules a fess between six mullets Argent Motto Will God, And I Shall

Parliament of England
Preceded by Rump Parliament	Member of Parliament for Hastings; 1660–1679; With: Nicholas Delves 1660–1661; Edmund Waller 1661–1679	Succeeded by Sir Robert Parker; John Ashburnham
Preceded by Sir Robert Parker; Thomas Mun	Member of Parliament for Hastings; 1685–1689; With: John Ashburnham	Succeeded by John Ashburnham; Thomas Mun
Baronetage of England
New creation	Baronet (of Bromham); 1661–1697	Succeeded by William Ashburnham
