= Thomas Pelham =

Thomas Pelham may refer to:

- Sir Thomas Pelham, 1st Baronet (c. 1540–1624), Member of Parliament for Lewes, Surrey, and Sussex
- Sir Thomas Pelham, 2nd Baronet (1597–c. 1654), Member of Parliament for East Grinstead and Sussex
- Thomas Pelham, 1st Baron Pelham (1653–1712), English Whig politician
- Thomas Pelham (of Lewes, senior) (c. 1678–1759), Member of Parliament for Lewes
- Thomas Pelham-Holles, 1st Duke of Newcastle (1693–1768)
- Thomas Pelham (of Stanmer) (c. 1705–1737), Turkey merchant, Member of Parliament for Lewes
- Thomas Pelham (of Lewes, junior) (c. 1705–1743), Member of Parliament for Hastings and Lewes
- Thomas Pelham, 1st Earl of Chichester (1728–1805), British Whig politician
- Thomas Pelham, 2nd Earl of Chichester (1756–1826), British Whig politician
- Lord Thomas Henry William Pelham (1847–1916), who was involved in the early boys' clubs movement, see 1871–72 FA Cup

== See also ==
- Thomas Pelham-Clinton, 3rd Duke of Newcastle-under-Lyne (1752–1795)
