= Pelham-Clinton =

Pelham-Clinton is a surname. Notable people with the surname include:

- Edward Pelham-Clinton, 10th Duke of Newcastle-under-Lyne (1920–1988), English nobleman and lepidopterist
- Henry Pelham-Clinton, 2nd Duke of Newcastle-under-Lyne, KG, PC (1720–1794), second son of the 7th Earl of Lincoln
- Thomas Pelham-Clinton, 3rd Duke of Newcastle (1752–1795), British soldier and politician
- Henry Pelham-Clinton, 4th Duke of Newcastle KG (1785–1851), British nobleman and politician
- Henry Pelham-Clinton, 5th Duke of Newcastle KG, PC (1811–1864), British politician
- Henry Pelham-Clinton, 6th Duke of Newcastle-under-Lyne (1834–1879), English nobleman
- Henry Pelham-Clinton, 7th Duke of Newcastle-under-Lyne (1864–1928), English nobleman
- Henry Pelham-Clinton, Earl of Lincoln (1750–1778), short-lived British politician
- Lord Arthur Pelham-Clinton (1840–1870), English aristocrat and Liberal Party politician
- Lord Charles Pelham-Clinton (1813–1894), British Conservative politician
- Lord Edward Pelham-Clinton GCVO KCB (1836–1907), British Liberal Party politician
- Lord Robert Pelham-Clinton (1820–1867), British Liberal Party politician
- Susan Pelham-Clinton, Lady Vane-Tempest (1839–1875), British noblewoman, mistress of King Edward VII of England when he was Prince of Wales

== See also ==
- Pelham (surname)
- Clinton (surname)
- Pelham-Clinton-Hope
