= Samuel Gott (1682–1725) =

British landowner and Whig politician

Samuel Gott (1682–1725), of Stanmer, Sussex, was a British landowner and Whig politician who sat in the House of Commons from 1708 to 1710. He was compelled to make good his brother's debts to the Treasury as receiver-general of taxes in East Sussex, which caused him to sell the family's manor in Sussex.

== Early life ==
Gott was baptised on 20 April 1682, the eldest son of Peter Gott, an ironmaster and politician, and his wife Martha Western, daughter of Thomas Western of St. Dunstan-in-the-East, London and Rivenhall, Essex.

== Career ==
Gott was returned as Whig Member of Parliament for Lewes at a by-election on 6 December 1708 in place of his father, who had been returned for Lewes and Sussex at the 1708 British general election, and opted to sit for Sussex. Like his father, he was a Whig, and voted for the naturalization of the Palatines in 1709 and the impeachment of Henry Sacheverell in 1710. He did not enjoy Parliamentary life and did not stand again at the 1710 election.

Early in 1710, Gott and his father became joint securities for his younger brother Peter Gott, who was appointed receiver-general of land taxes for East Sussex. He succeeded his father in the family estate in 1712. However his brother failed to balance his accounts by 1713 and Gott was left to pay £10,000 to the Treasury to settle them. He and his relatives Robert and Anne Western sold the manor of Stanmer to Henry Pelham for £7,500 in May 1713 and he thereafter made his seat at Crundale, Kent.

== Later life and legacy ==
On 29 July 1721, Gott married his cousin Mary Tyssen, the daughter of Francis Tyssen of Shacklewell. They had no children. Gott died in early 1725. His widow, who remarried Sir Roger Meredith, 5th Baronet, died in 1742, and his estate ultimately passed to his sisters.

Parliament of Great Britain
Preceded by Thomas Pelham; Peter Gott	Member of Parliament for Lewes; 1708–1710; With: Thomas Pelham	Succeeded by Thomas Pelham; Peter Gott
