= Edmund Waller =

English poet and politician (1606–1687)

Edmund Waller JP, FRS
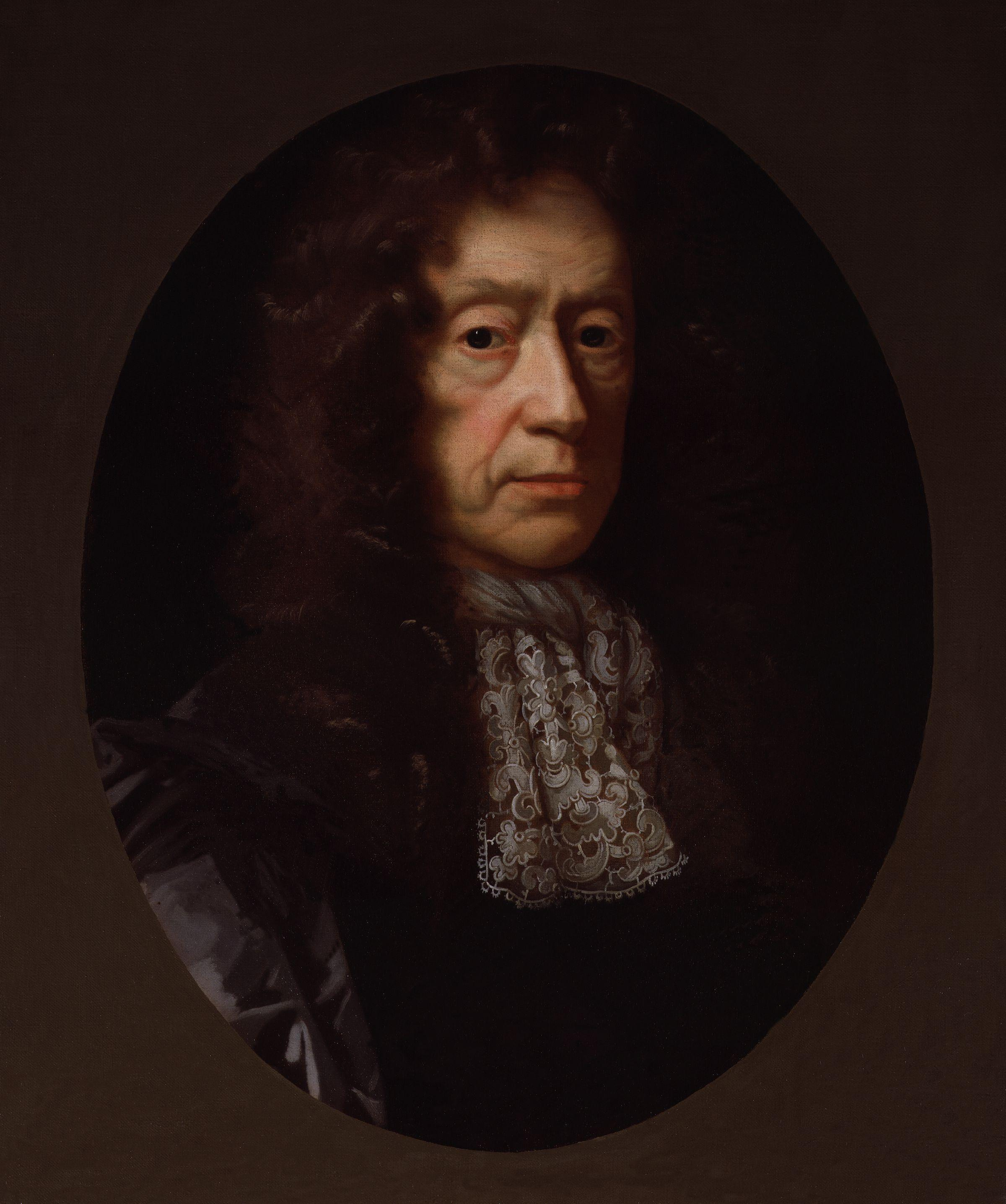
- Portrait by John Riley, c. 1685

Member of Parliament for Saltash
- In office May 1685 – November 1685 (suspended)

Member of Parliament for Hastings
- In office 1661–1679

Member of Parliament for St Ives
- In office December 1640 – July 1643 (expelled)

Member of Parliament for Amersham 1628
- In office April 1640 – May 1640

Member of Parliament for Wycombe
- In office December 1625 – June 1626

Member of Parliament for Ilchester
- In office February 1624 – March 1625

Personal details
- Born: 3 March 1606 Coleshill, Buckinghamshire, England
- Died: 21 October 1687 (aged 81) St James's, London, England
- Cause of death: Oedema
- Resting place: St Mary and All Saints Church, Beaconsfield
- Children: Edmund
- Education: RGS Wycombe, Eton College
- Alma mater: King's College, Cambridge
- Occupation: Poet and Politician

Edmund Waller (3 March 1606 - 21 October 1687), was a poet and politician from Buckinghamshire. He sat as MP for various constituencies between 1624 and 1687, and was one of the longest serving members of the English House of Commons. Although considered a major poet by contemporaries, his literary reputation declined after his death, and he is now rarely read.

Waller first entered Parliament in 1624, although he played little part in the political struggles prior to the outbreak of the First English Civil War in 1642. Unlike his relatives William and Hardress Waller, he was Royalist in sympathy. In 1643, he was accused of plotting to seize London for Charles I, and allegedly escaped execution by paying a large bribe.

After his sentence was commuted to banishment, he lived in France and Switzerland until allowed home in 1651 by Oliver Cromwell, a distant relative. He returned to Parliament after the 1660 Stuart Restoration, but retired from active politics in 1677, and died of oedema in October 1687.

== Personal details ==
Edmund Waller was born on 3 March 1606 at Stocks Place, Coleshill, Buckinghamshire, eldest son of Robert Waller (1560–1616) and Anne Hampden (1589–1658). He came from a family of 15, many of whom survived to adulthood, including Elizabeth (1601–?), Anne (1602–1642), Cecilia (1603–?), Robert (1606–1641), Mary (1608–1660), Ursula (1610–1692) and John (1616–1667). Cecilia married Nathaniel Tomkins, executed by Parliament in 1643, while Mary married Adrian Scrope, executed after the 1660 Stuart Restoration as a regicide.

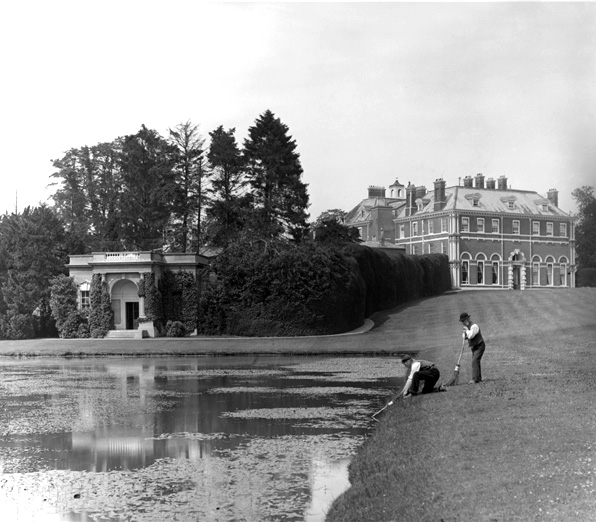
Hall Barn, circa 1898; Waller family home near Beaconsfield, Buckinghamshire

Through his mother, Waller was distantly connected to Oliver Cromwell, while he and John Hampden were grandchildren of Griffith Hampden (1543–1591). On his father's side, he was related to the Parliamentarian generals Hardress and William Waller.

In 1631, he married Anne Banks, orphaned heiress of a wealthy merchant; contracted in defiance of the Privy Council of England, the marriage was eventually approved by Charles I. Anne died in childbirth in 1634, leaving two children, Robert (1633–1652?) and Elizabeth (1634–1683).

In 1644, he re-married, this time to Mary Bracey (died 1677) and they had numerous children; since their eldest son, Benjamin, was mentally disabled, he was succeeded by Edmund Waller (1652–1700), MP for Amersham from 1689 to 1698. His youngest son, Stephen Waller (1676–1708), was one of the Commissioners who negotiated the 1707 Treaty of Union.

== Career ==
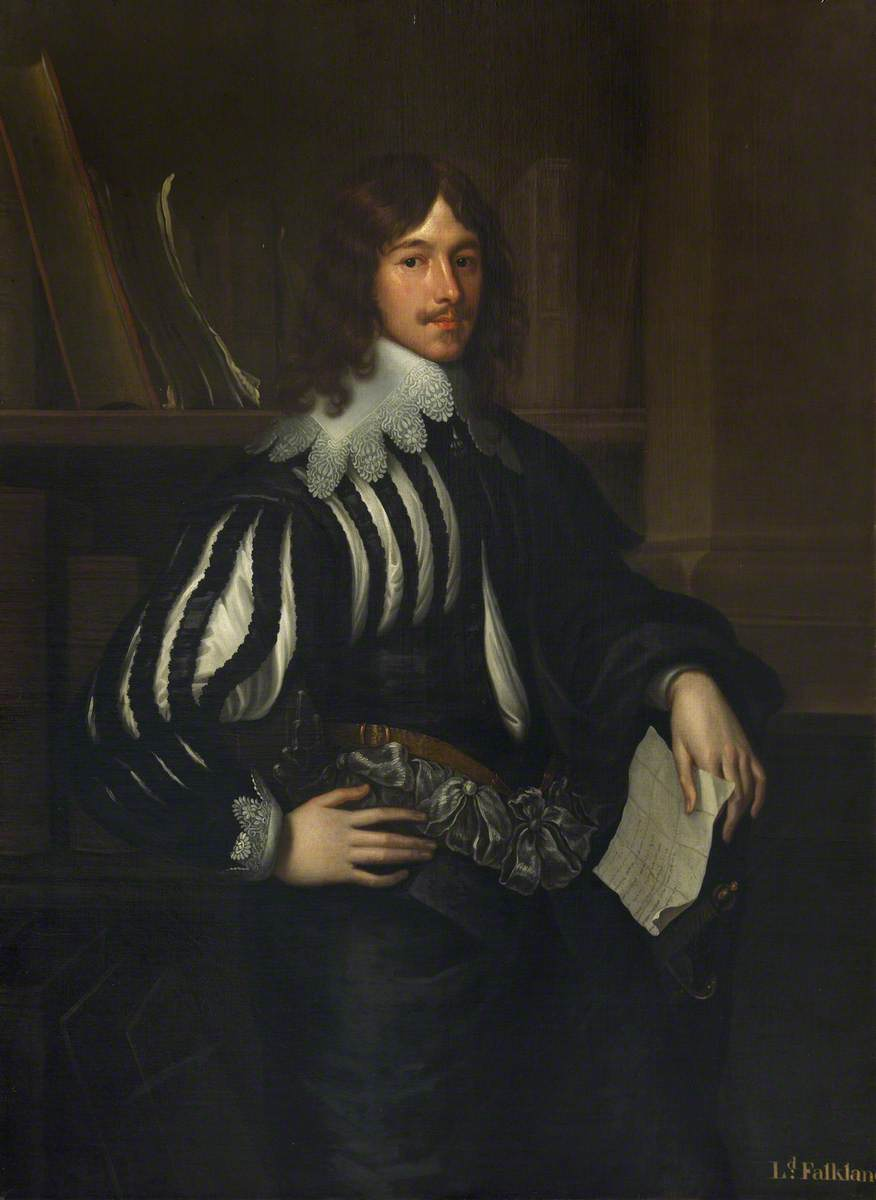
Viscount Falkland, killed fighting for the Royalists in 1643; Waller was deeply influenced by his moderation and tolerance.

Waller attended Royal Grammar School, High Wycombe, followed by Eton and King's College, Cambridge. He left without a degree, and as was common in this period did a course in law at Lincoln's Inn, graduating in 1622. He was first elected in 1624 as MP for Ilchester, when he was the youngest person in the Commons, then for Chepping Wycombe in 1626. On coming of age in 1627, he inherited an estate worth up to £2,500 a year, making him one of the wealthiest men in Buckinghamshire.

Returned for Amersham in 1628, he made virtually no impact on Parliament before it was dissolved in 1629, when Charles I instituted eleven years of Personal Rule. During this period, he became friends with George Morley, later Bishop of Worcester, who guided his reading and provided advice on writing, while Waller apparently paid his debts. Morley also introduced Waller to Lucius Cary, 2nd Viscount Falkland; he became a member of the Great Tew Circle, which included Edward Hyde, and was greatly influenced by Falkland's moderation and tolerance.

Nineteenth-century biographers dated his earliest work to the 1620s, largely because they commemorate events occurring in that period, but modern scholars suggest they were actually written in the mid to late 1630s in an attempt to build a career at court. As well as Charles himself, many of his works are addressed to members of the extended Percy family, such as the Countess of Carlisle, the Countess of Sunderland (Note: The "Sacharissa" who appears in much of his work from this period) and the Earl of Northumberland. Hyde recorded Waller became a poet at the age of thirty, "when other Men give over writing Verses".

When Charles recalled Parliament in April 1640 to approve taxes for the Bishops' Wars, Waller was re-elected for Amersham, then for St Ives in November. Despite general consensus attempts by Charles to govern without Parliament had gone too far, moderates like Hyde and Falkland were also wary of changing the balance too much the other way. John Pym, who headed the Parliamentary opposition to Charles, gave Waller responsibility for the impeachment of Sir Francis Crawley, one of the Ship Money judges, but he confirmed his Royalist sympathies by voting against the execution of Strafford in April 1641, and the removal of bishops from the House of Lords.

Unlike Hyde and Falkland who joined the king when the First English Civil War began in August 1642, Waller remained in London, apparently with Charles' permission, where he continued to support moderates like Denzil Holles who wanted a negotiated peace. In May 1643 a plot was uncovered, allegedly organized by Waller along with his brother-in-law Nathaniel Tomkins, and wealthy merchant Richard Chaloner; what apparently began as a plan to force Parliament into negotiations by withholding taxes turned into an armed conspiracy intended to allow the Royalist army to take control of London.

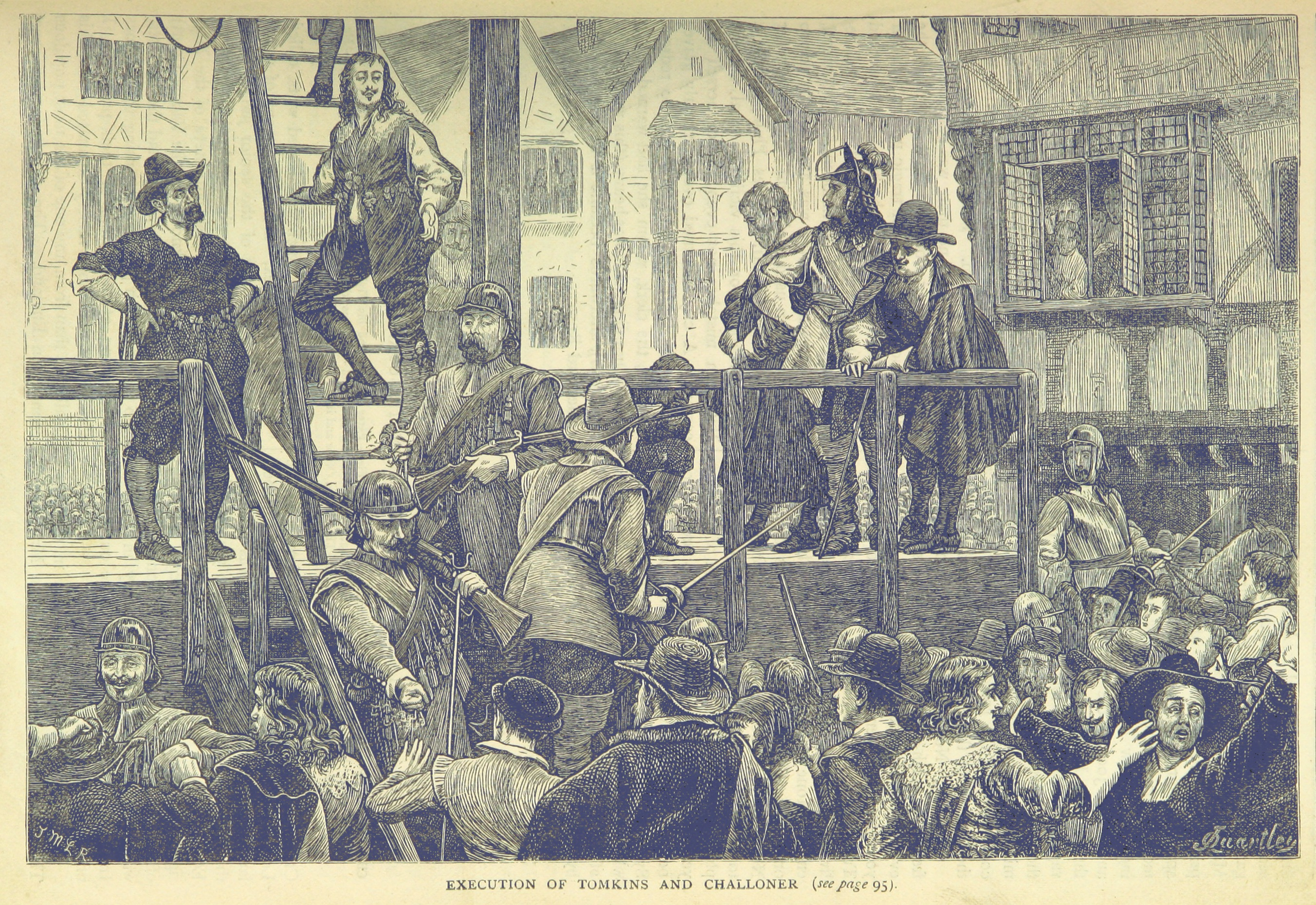
Execution of Nathaniel Tomkins and Chaloner, July 1643; an episode that permanently damaged Waller's reputation

After Waller was arrested, he made a full confession, implicating a number of co-conspirators, along with a number of men who had no relation to the conspiracy. While imprisoned Waller made an appeal to MP Henry Marten to intercede for him. He escaped the death penalty, allegedly by paying bribes, while Chaloner and Tomkins were executed on 5 July 1643. Simonds d'Ewes documented Waller's trial in his diary, with great disdain for what he saw as Waller's cowardice and duplicity. Many moderates were forced to disavow support for a peace settlement to avoid suspicion of involvement and reaffirm their backing for military action. After spending 18 months in prison without trial, Waller was fined £10,000 and permitted to go into exile in Paris November 1644, accompanied by his new wife Mary; however, the affair caused lasting damage to his reputation.

Waller travelled with John Evelyn in Switzerland and Italy; unlike many Royalists, he lived in some comfort using money sent to him by his mother. Probably with the support of his relations Cromwell and Scrope, the Rump Parliament allowed him to return home in January 1652. He established good relations with Cromwell, writing him a 'Panegyrick' in 1655, and later supporting proposals to make him king; in a poem written after the capture of the Spanish treasure fleet in 1658, he suggested "let the rich ore be forthwith melted down, and the state fixed by making him a crown'.

When Charles II returned to the throne after The Restoration, Waller commemorated the occasion with his 1660 poem To the King, upon his Majesty's Happy Return. Reconciling past support for the Commonwealth with the restored monarchy was a problem faced by many. When asked by the King on this point, Waller is reported to have replied "Poets, Sir, succeeded better at fiction than in truth". His biographer Samuel Johnson wrote (1779) that it showed "a prostituted mind may retain the glitter of wit, but has lost the dignity of virtue". In 1661, he was elected to the Cavalier Parliament as MP for Hastings; he became a Fellow of the Royal Society in 1663, although does not appear to have contributed papers himself. He played a prominent role in the impeachment and exile of Clarendon in 1667, and thereafter held a number of positions under the Cabal ministry.

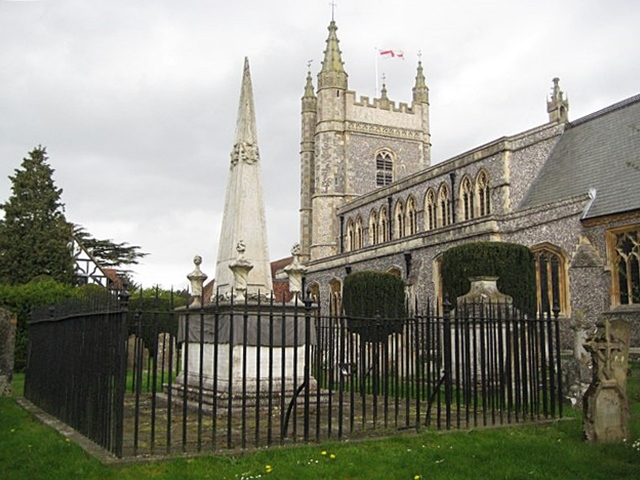
Edmund Waller's tomb, Beaconsfield

Originally viewed as a supporter of the Court, after 1674 he gained a reputation for independence and was still regarded as one of the best speakers in the Commons. Generally an advocate of religious tolerance, especially for Protestant Nonconformists, he was however convinced of the truth of the Popish Plot in 1678 and withdrew from active politics during the 1679 to 1681 Exclusion Crisis. On the accession of James II, he was elected for Saltash in 1685.

He wrote two poems to the new king, urging reconciliation and national unity, but James suspended Parliament in November after it refused to pass his Declaration of Indulgence. Waller died at his London house in St James's on 21 October 1687, and was buried in the churchyard of St Mary and All Saints’ Church, Beaconsfield; his tomb is now grade II* listed.

== Literary works and assessment ==
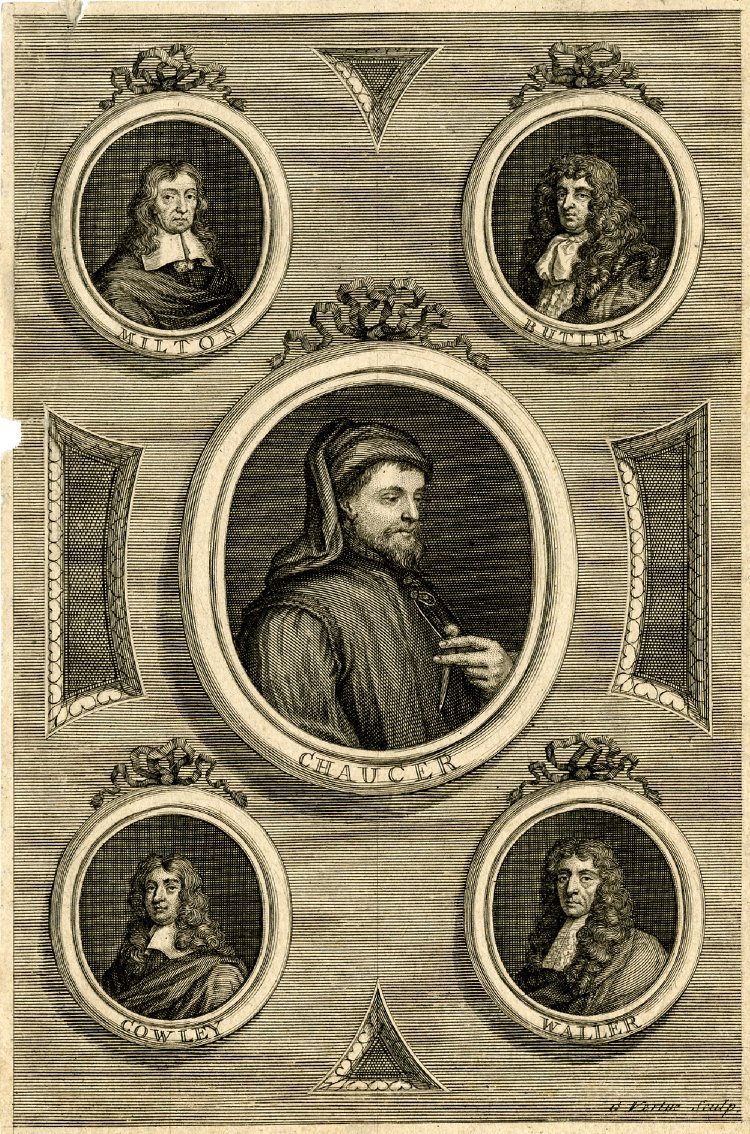
1717 engraving; Geoffrey Chaucer (centre), surrounded by Waller, Samuel Butler, John Milton and Abraham Cowley

Waller's poetry was admired by contemporaries including John Dryden and Gerard Langbaine, although his extravagant praise for members of the court and Royal family was later parodied by Andrew Marvell in "Last Instructions to a Painter".

Dryden wrote: "Rime has all the advantages of prose, besides its own. But the excellence and dignity of it were never fully known till Mr. Waller taught it; he first made writing easily an art; first showed us how to conclude the sense, most commonly in distichs, which, in the verse of those before him, runs on for so many lines together, that the reader is out of breath to overtake it."

In the 1766 edition of the Biographia Britannica, Waller was described as "the most celebrated Lyric Poet that England ever produced", and Francis Atterbury described him as "the Parent of English Verse".

However, his verse had begun to fall out of favour by the beginning of the nineteenth century. Edmund Gosse, author of his biography in the 1911 Encyclopædia Britannica, wrote: 'Waller's lyrics were at one time admired to excess, but with the exception of "Go, lovely Rose" and one or two others [elsewhere he selects "On a Girdle"], they have greatly lost their charm'.

In his 1885 study on Waller and the classicizing influence, From Shakespeare to Pope, Gosse further writes: "I believe that the main reason of Waller's popularity and influence was the prosaic, the anti-imaginative, function which he conceived for poetry. It appeared to him that verse, and verse of a more precise kind than had hitherto been written in England, was a proper vehicle for the celebration of facts, public or private, of passing interest." Gosse links this to the widening of political awareness which characterized the decades leading up to the English Civil War, and the simultaneous narrowing of imagination which took place as the exploratory spirit of the Elizabethan era, manifest in the lives as well as the works of poets like Sidney and Lodge and Raleigh, exhausted itself.

By 1995, the protagonist of The Information, a novel by Martin Amis, dismisses him as a 'seat-warmer, air sniffer and mediocrity'. However, H. M. Redmond argued 'immoderate censure of his life' had combined with 'interest-killing appreciation' of his verse to 'prevent a dispassionate assessment'. One suggestion is while his writing is limited, he played an important role in developing a format and style adapted and improved by Alexander Pope among others.

Much of his early poetry was written for the Caroline court, while he was famous for his 'Panegyricks', written in support of Cromwell, then both Charles II and his brother James, as well as other members of the Royal family. (Note: Examples include the pro-Protectorate "Upon the Present War with Spain, and the First Victory Obtained at Sea" (1658–1659); "To the King, upon his Majesties Happy Return" in 1660; "On St James's Park as Lately Improved by his Majesty", "Upon her Majesties New Buildings at Somerset-House", "Of the Lady Mary, Princess of Orange", and "A Presage of the Ruine of the Turkish Empire, Presented to his Majestie on his Birth-Day".) His longest and most ambitious work of this type portrayed the inconclusive 1665 Battle of Lowestoft; (Note: "Instructions to a painter, for the drawing of the posture and progress of his majesties forces at sea, under the command of his highness-royal; together with the battel and victory obtained over the Dutch") presenting it as an heroic victory and heaping praise on James, it was widely ridiculed.

He was strongly influenced by Thomas Hobbes, whose Leviathan he admired, and whose De Cive he at one point proposed to translate. His early work was far more successful than later efforts and during his exile an unlicensed collection of his poems was published in 1645. (Note: Most are in the traditional classical style then popular, and include; "Of the Lady who can Sleep when she Pleases"; "Of her Passing through a Crowd of People"; "On the Friendship betwixt Sacharissa and Amoret"; "To a Lady from whom he Receiv'd a Silver Pen"; "In Answer of Sir John Suckling's Verses"; "To Flavia"; "Song" (Go, lovely rose); "To a Lady in Retirement"; "On a Girdle"; and "The Story of Phoebus and Daphne Apply'd") Reprinted in 1664, 1668, 1682, and 1686, they were popular in part because they were easily set to music; two volumes of previously uncollected writings, "The Maid's Tragedy Altered" and "The Second Part of Mr Waller's Poems" were published after his death in 1690. They included Divine Poems, self-published by Waller in 1686; most critics view them as 'indifferent' and showing his decline as a writer.

== Sources ==
- Allison, Alexander (2014) [1962]. Toward An Augustan Poetic: Edmund Waller's 'Reform' of English Poetry (2014 ed.). University Press of Kentucky. ISBN 978-0813150994.
- Amis, Martin (1995). The Information (2008 ed.). Vintage. ISBN 978-0099526698.
- Chernaik, Warren (2004). "Waller, Edmund". Oxford Dictionary of National Biography (online ed.). Oxford University Press. doi:10.1093/ref:odnb/28556. (Subscription, Wikipedia Library access or UK public library membership required.)
- Cruickshanks, Eveline; Handley, Stuart (2002). Waller, Edmund (1652–1700), of Hall Barn, Beaconsfield, Bucks in The History of Parliament: the House of Commons 1690–1715. Boydell & Brewer.
- Gosse, Edmund William (1911). "Waller, Edmund" . In Chisholm, Hugh (ed.). Encyclopædia Britannica. Vol. 28 (11th ed.). Cambridge University Press. pp. 282–283.
- Greenwood, Douglas (1999), Who's Buried where in England (3rd ed.), Constable, p. 128, ISBN 0-09-479310-7
- Harris, Tim (2014). Rebellion: Britain's First Stuart Kings, 1567–1642. OUP. ISBN 978-0-19-920900-2.
- Hillyer, Richard (1999). "Edmund Waller's Sacred Poems". SEL: Studies in English Literature 1500–1900. 29 (1): 155–169. doi:10.2307/1556310. JSTOR 1556310.
- Johnson, Samuel (1977) [1905]. Edmund Waller; Lives of the English Poets, Volume I (1977 ed.). Oxford Univ. Press. ISBN 978-0192500830.
- Kyle, Chris; Sgroi, Rosemary (2010). Thrush, Andrew; Ferris, John P. (eds.). Waller, Edmund (1606–1687), of Hall Barn, Beaconsfield, Bucks.; later of St. James's Street, Westminster in The History of Parliament: the House of Commons 1604–1629. Cambridge University Press. Archived from the original on 9 July 2021.
- Maclagan, Michael (1946). "The Family of Dormer in Oxfordshire and Buckinghamshire" (PDF). Oxoniensia. 11–12: 90–101.
- Pritchard, Will (1998). "The Invention of Edmund Waller". Restoration: Studies in English Literary Culture, 1660–1700. 22 (1): 1–17. JSTOR 43293954.
- Raylor, Timothy (2006). "The Early Poetic Career of Edmund Waller". Huntington Library Quarterly. 69 (2): 239–266. doi:10.1525/hlq.2006.69.2.239.
- Richmond, HM (1971). Keast, William R (ed.). The Fate of Edmund Waller in Seventeenth Century Poetry; Modern Essays in Criticism. OUP. ISBN 978-0195013917.
- Roberts, Keith (2003). First Newbury 1643: The Turning Point (illustrated ed.). Osprey Publishing. ISBN 9781841763330.
- Royle, Trevor (2004). Civil War: The Wars of the Three Kingdoms 1638–1660. Abacus. ISBN 978-0-349-11564-1.
- Struthers, John (1827). The history of Scotland, from the Union to the abolition of the heritable jurisdictions in MDCCXLVIII. Blackie, Fullarton, & Co.
- Virgoe, Roger (1981). Hasler, PW (ed.). Hampden, Griffith (1543–91), of Great Hampden, Bucks; in The History of Parliament: the House of Commons 1558–1603. Boydell & Brewer.

== Bibliography ==
- Baldwin, James, ed. (1892). Six Centuries of English Poetry. kindle ebook. ASIN B004TREH7W.
- Cibber, Theophilus (1753). The Lives of the Poets of Great Britain and Ireland: to the time of Dean Swift. Vol. II. London: R. Griffiths. pp. 240–264.
- Gilfillan, George (1857). Poetical Works of Edmund Waller & Sir John Denham.
- Thorn-Drury, G, ed. (1893). Poetical Works; A critical edition with a careful biography.
- Waller, Edmund (1690). The maid's tragedy altered with some other pieces / by Edmund Waller, Esq.; not before printed in the several editions of his poems. Jacob Tonson.

Parliament of England
Preceded by Sir Richard Wynn; Nathaniel Tomkins	Member of Parliament for Ilchester; 1624; With: Sir Richard Wynn	Succeeded by Sir Robert Gorges; Sir Richard Wynn
Preceded by Henry Coke; Thomas Lane	Member of Parliament for Wycombe; 1626; With: Henry Coke	Succeeded by Thomas Lane; Sir William Borlase
Preceded by William Clarke; Francis Drake	Member of Parliament for Amersham; 1628–1629; With: William Hakewill	Parliament suspended until 1640
Vacant Parliament suspended since 1629	Member of Parliament for Amersham; 1640; With: William Drake	Succeeded by Francis Drake; William Cheyney
Preceded by William Dell; Sir Henry Marten	Member of Parliament for St Ives; 1640–1643; With: Francis Godolphin	Succeeded by John Feilder; Francis Godolphin
Preceded by Sir Denny Ashburnham; Nicholas Delves	Member of Parliament for Hastings; 1660–1679; With: Sir Denny Ashburnham	Succeeded by Sir Robert Parker; John Ashburnham
Preceded by Bernard Granville; Sir John Davie	Member of Parliament for Saltash; 1685–1687; With: Sir Cyril Wyche	Succeeded by Bernard Granville; John Waddon
