= Pelham-Clinton-Hope =

Pelham-Clinton-Hope may refer to:

- Francis Pelham-Clinton-Hope, 8th Duke of Newcastle-under-Lyne (1866–1941), English nobleman
- Henry Pelham-Clinton-Hope, 9th Duke of Newcastle-under-Lyne OBE, DL, JP (1907–1988), British peer and aviator

== See also ==
- Pelham (surname)
- Clinton (surname)
- Hope (surname)
- Pelham-Clinton
