= Ashburnham baronets =

Title in the Baronetage of England

The Ashburnham Baronetcy, of Broomham in the County of Sussex, is a title in the Baronetage of England. It was created on 15 May 1661 for Denny Ashburnham, Member of Parliament for Hastings. He was the grandson of Adam Ashburnham, Member of Parliament for Winchelsea in 1592, who was the son of Laurence Ashburnham, and a descendant of Richard Ashburnham of Broomham (15th century), second son of Thomas Ashburnham, whose eldest son John was the ancestor of the Earls of Ashburnham. He was succeeded by his elder son, William, the second Baronet. He represented Hastings and Seaford in the House of Commons. He died childless in 1755 and was succeeded by his younger brother, Charles, the third Baronet. His son, William, the fourth Baronet, was Bishop of Chichester. On his death the title passed to his son, the fifth Baronet. He sat as Member of Parliament for Hastings.

His eldest son, William, the sixth Baronet, died childless in 1843 and was succeeded by his younger brother, John, the seventh Baronet. He was Chancellor and Prebendary of Chichester. On his death in 1854 the title passed to his eldest surviving son, Anchitel, the eighth Baronet. In 1858 he was found by the House of Lords to be a co-heir to the ancient barony of Grandison, which had been in abeyance since 1375. He was succeeded by his eldest son, Anchitel, the ninth baronet. He married Elizabeth Ellen, daughter of George Burry Clement. In 1899 he assumed by Royal licence the additional surname of Clement. He was succeeded by his younger brother, Reginald, the tenth Baronet. He was childless and on his death in 1944 the title passed to his younger brother, Fleetwood, the eleventh Baronet. He was succeeded by his second but eldest surviving son, Denny, the twelfth Baronet (the eldest son, Anchitel Fleetwood Ashburnham having died on active service in Palestine in 1940.) As of 2008 the title is held by the latter's grandson, James, the thirteenth Baronet, who succeeded in 1999. He is a co-heir to the abeyant barony of Grandison.

Another member of the family to gain distinction was Sir Cromer Ashburnham (1831–1917), youngest son of the seventh Baronet. He was a Major-General in the British Army.

== Ashburnham baronets, of Broomham (1661) ==
Asburnham baronets, of Broomham
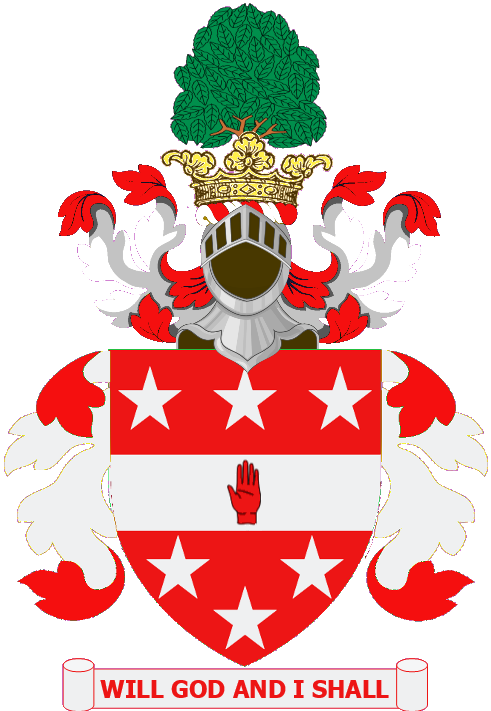
- Motto: Will God, and I shall
- Arms: Gules a Fess between six Mullets Argent
- Crest: Out of a Ducal Coronet Or an Ash Tree proper

- Sir Denny Ashburnham, 1st Baronet (died 1697)
- Sir William Ashburnham, 2nd Baronet (1678–1755)
- Sir Charles Ashburnham, 3rd Baronet (c. 1680–1762)
- Sir William Ashburnham, 4th Baronet (1710–1797)
- Sir William Ashburnham, 5th Baronet (1739–1823)
- Sir William Ashburnham, 6th Baronet (1769–1843)
- Sir John Ashburnham, 7th Baronet (1770–1854)
- Sir Anchitel Ashburnham, 8th Baronet (1828–1899)
- Sir Anchitel Piers Ashburnham-Clement, 9th Baronet (1861–1935)
- Sir Reginald Ashburnham, 10th Baronet (1865–1944)
- Sir Fleetwood Ashburnham, 11th Baronet (1869–1953)
- Sir Denny Reginald Ashburnham, 12th Baronet (1916–1999)
- Sir James Fleetwood Ashburnham, 13th Baronet (born 1979)

The heir apparent is the present baronet's son Levent John Ashburnham (born 2013).

== See also ==
- Earl of Ashburnham
