= John Mounsher =

English businessman and politician

John Mounsher (16 July 1665 – by December 1702) was an English businessman and politician.

He was the son of Andrew Mounsher (or Mounser) of Portsmouth, a ropemaker. He continued the rope business and was involved in local politics, becoming an Alderman in 1695 and serving as Mayor of Portsmouth in 1696 and 1700.

He was elected a Member of Parliament (MP) for Hastings in 1701, sitting until 1702.

He died in 1702, aged 37. He had married twice. With his first wife he had one son and then in 1695 he married Elizabeth Ryley of St. Saviour's, Southwark, Surrey and had another son and a daughter.

Parliament of England
| Preceded by John Pulteney; Peter Gott | Member of Parliament for Hastings; 1701–1702; With: John Pulteney | Succeeded by John Pulteney; Hon. William Ashburnham |
