= Thomas Mun (MP) =

English politician (c. 1645–1692)

Thomas Mun (/mʌn/; c. 1645 – 15 February 1692) was an English politician. He was a Member of Parliament (MP) for Hastings from 1681 to 1685 and again from 1689 to 1690.

== Life ==
He was the son of John Mun (1615–1670), who was the son of Thomas Mun, a writer on economics. He inherited Snailham in Icklesham, Sussex.

He was M.P. for Hastings in the last parliament of Charles II, held at Oxford in 1681, and again in the Convention parliament, 1689. As one of the barons of the Cinque ports he also represented Hastings at the coronations of James II, 1685, and of William and Mary. In May 1689 he, with the Hon. Sir Vere Fane, K.B. and John Farthing, esq., petitioned the king for an improvement in the management of the excise.

He was buried at Bearsted on 15 February 1692. He had eleven children.

Parliament of England
Preceded by Robert Parker, Bt; John Ashburnham	Member of Parliament for Hastings; 1681–1685; With: Robert Parker, Bt 1679–1685	Succeeded by Denny Ashburnham; John Ashburnham
Preceded by Denny Ashburnham; John Ashburnham	Member of Parliament for Hastings; 1689–1690; With: John Ashburnham 1679–1681; John Beaumont 1685–1695	Succeeded by Peter Gott; John Beaumont
