= Henry Pelham (of Stanmer) =

British politician (c.1694–1725)

Henry Pelham (c.1694 – 2 June 1725) was a British landowner and politician who sat in the House of Commons from 1715 to 1725.

Pelham was the eldest son of Henry Pelham and his wife Frances Byne, daughter of John Byne of Rowdell, Sussex.

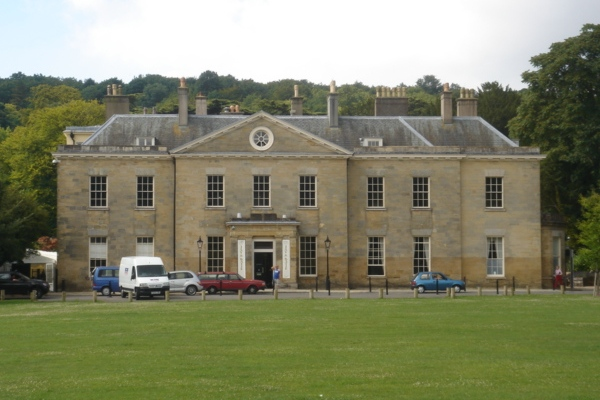
Stanmer House

Pelham was the first cousin of the Duke of Newcastle, who brought him in to stand for Hastings at the 1715 election shortly after Henry reached his majority. Newcastle's ownership of Hastings Castle and the lordship and Rape of Hastings gave him considerable local influence; the borough's corporation asked him to recommend one candidate, while the incumbent members, the independent Whig Archibald Hutcheson and the Tory Sir Joseph Martin also stood. Pelham was returned at the top of the poll, and Hutcheson, who enjoyed both a personal interest in town and the support of Lord Ashburnham and the Duke of Marlborough, finished nearly as strongly, while Martin was defeated with less than half of Hutcheson's votes.

Pelham was a reliable Government supporter, although he absented himself from the Peerage Bill debates in 1719. He voted with the government in favor of the Septennial Act 1716, despite a petition from the corporation against it. He was brought in for Lewes in 1722 on the Newcastle interest, and died three years later of tuberculosis.

Pelham succeeded his father in 1721, inheriting Stanmer Park near Lewes, Sussex. He commissioned French architect Nicholas Dubois to remodel the mansion house in 1722, although it would not be completed until after his death, when the estate had passed to his younger brother Thomas.

Parliament of Great Britain
| Preceded by Sir Joseph Martin; Archibald Hutcheson | Member of Parliament for Hastings; 1715–1722; With: Archibald Hutcheson | Succeeded by Archibald Hutcheson; Sir William Ashburnham |
| Preceded by Thomas Pelham; Philip Yorke | Member of Parliament for Lewes; 1722–1725; With: Thomas Pelham | Succeeded by Thomas Pelham; Sir Nicholas Pelham |
