= George Naylor =

English lawyer and Whig politician

George Naylor (21 October 1670 – 29 January 1730), of Hurstmonceaux, Sussex, was an English lawyer and Whig politician who sat in the House of Commons between 1706 and 1722.

Naylor was the eldest son of Francis Naylor of Staple Inn and his wife Bethia Beadnall, daughter of George Beadnall of Newcastle upon Tyne. His father was a Chancery lawyer. He matriculated at St. John's College, Oxford on 5 June 1684 and entered Lincoln's Inn on 30 April 1685. In 1694, he was called to the bar. He married Grace Pelham, daughter of Thomas Pelham, 1st Baron Pelham on 4 July 1704. He purchased the estate at Hurstmonceaux Castle in 1708.

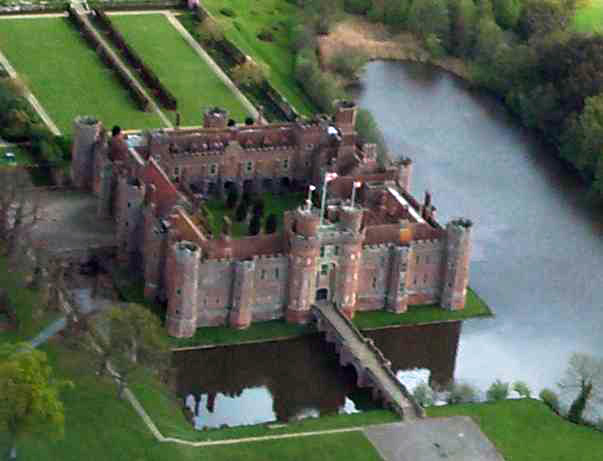
Herstmonceux Castle

Naylor was returned unopposed as Whig Member of Parliament (MP) for Seaford in the interest of his father-in-law Lord Pelham at a by-election on 12 December 1706. He was returned unopposed at the 1708 general election, and though not a very active member, supported the naturalization of the Palatines in 1709 and the impeachment of Dr Sacheverell in 1710. He was defeated at Seaford in a contest at the 1710 general election. His father-in-law, Lord Pelham died in February 1712, and Naylor became an executor and guardian of Pelham's two sons, Thomas, the new Lord Pelham, and Henry. He was returned without opposition as MP for Seaford in 1713 and voted against the expulsion of Richard Steele on 18 March 1714.

Naylor was re-elected MP for Seaford in 1715 and was appointed a Commissioner for building 50 new churches. His brother-in-law Lord Pelham came of age in 1714, and was created Duke of Newcastle in 1715. When the Whigs split in 1717 Naylor, unlike his brother-in-law, followed Walpole. There was apparently little contact between Naylor and Newcastle, and Naylor was not put up for Seaford at the 1722 general election. He was appointed an Usher of the Exchequer by Walpole in 1722 but surrendered the post by August 1727.

Naylor died on 29 January 1730. His wife had died in 1710 and their daughter died without issue. He left his estate at Hurstmonceaux to a nephew Francis Hare, who adopted the surname Naylor.

Parliament of England
| Preceded by Sir William Thomas, Bt; William Lowndes | Member of Parliament for Seaford; 1706–1707; With: William Lowndes | Succeeded by Parliament of Great Britain |
Parliament of Great Britain
| Preceded by Parliament of England | Member of Parliament for Seaford; 1707–1710; With: William Lowndes | Succeeded by William Lowndes; Thomas Chowne |
| Preceded by Thomas Chowne; William Lowndes | Member of Parliament for Seaford; 1713–1722; With: William Lowndes to 1715; Sir William Ashburnham, Bt 1715–17; Hon. Henry Pelham 1717–22 | Succeeded by Sir William Gage, Bt; Sir Philip Yorke |
