= Nicholas Pelham =

English politician (1650–1739)

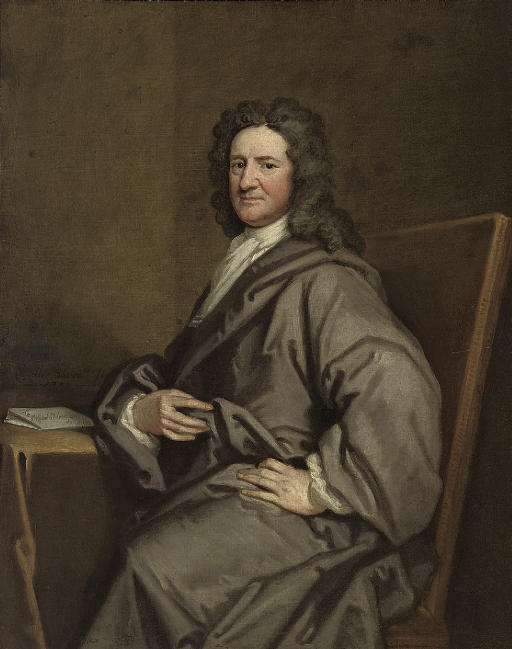
- Alma mater: Eton College

Sir Nicholas Pelham (1650 – 8 November 1739) was a British politician.

The third son of Sir Thomas Pelham, 2nd Baronet (but the first by Thomas' third wife Margaret), Pelham was educated at Christ Church, Oxford.

Pelham was knighted on 20 April 1661, and served in several post-Restoration Parliaments for Seaford and Sussex, and then in Lewes from 1702 to 1705. He married Jane Huxley, daughter of James Huxley of Dornford, by whom he had two sons and one daughter:

- Thomas Pelham (c.1678–1759)
- James Pelham (c.1683–1761)
- Margaret Pelham, married Sir William Ashburnham, 2nd Baronet

In 1726, his great-nephew, the Duke of Newcastle, brought him back into Parliament at Lewes, at the by-election that ensued after the death of another of Nicholas's great-nephews, Henry Pelham; Henry's brother Thomas had declined to take the seat until after he returned from Constantinople. However, Thomas was again in England by the next general election in 1727, and Sir Nicholas stood down in his favour. Sir Nicholas died at an advanced age in 1739.

Parliament of England
Preceded by Sir William Thomas; Robert Morley	Member of Parliament for Seaford with Sir William Thomas; 1671–1679	Succeeded by Sir William Thomas; Herbert Stapley
Preceded by Sir John Pelham; John Lewknor	Member of Parliament for Sussex with Sir John Pelham; 1679–1681	Succeeded by Sir William Thomas; Sir John Fagg
Preceded by Edward Selwyn; Sir William Thomas	Member of Parliament for Seaford with William Campion; 1689–1690	Succeeded by William Campion; Henry Pelham
Preceded by Thomas Pelham; Richard Payne	Member of Parliament for Lewes with Richard Payne; 1702–1705	Succeeded by Richard Payne; Thomas Pelham
Parliament of Great Britain
Preceded by Thomas Pelham; Henry Pelham	Member of Parliament for Lewes with Thomas Pelham; 1726–1727	Succeeded by Thomas Pelham; Thomas Pelham
