= Cromer Ashburnham =

British Army officer

Major-General Sir Cromer Ashburnham KCB
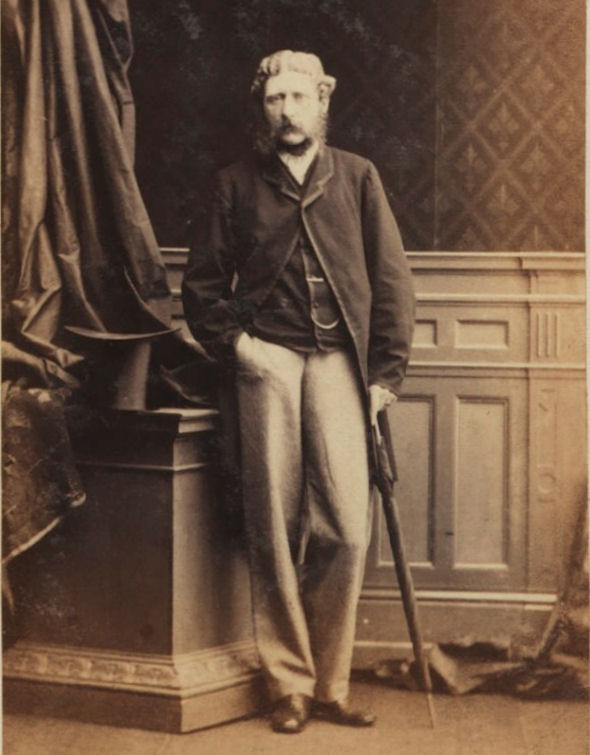
- Photograph of Ashburnham by Camille Silvy, 1861
- Born: 13 September 1831
- Died: 25 February 1917 (aged 85)

Major-General Sir Cromer Ashburnham KCB (13 September 1831 – 25 February 1917) was a British Army officer.

He was born in 1831, the fourth son of Sir John Ashburnham, 7th Baronet, and joined the Army in 1855, commissioned in the 60th Rifles. He served during the Indian Mutiny, and commanded the 2nd Battalion of the regiment during the Second Afghan War. In 1880 he was promoted to command the 3rd Battalion, and led it during the First Boer War, where he was twice mentioned in despatches, and the 1882 Anglo-Egyptian War, where he was again twice mentioned in despatches and was appointed KCB. At the Battle of Tel el-Kebir, he commanded a brigade. He remained in command of the 3rd Battalion during the 1884 Sudan Campaign, and in 1884 was appointed the Governor of Suakim.

He retired in 1886 with the rank of major-general. In 1881, he had been appointed an aide-de-camp to Queen Victoria, and in 1907, he was appointed a colonel-commandant of the King's Royal Rifle Corps.

Ashburnham married Urith Amelia Martin, sister of George Bohun Martin on 26 July 1864. They had the following children:

- Urith Amelia Ashburnham (d. 4 Feb 1958)
- Maj. Cromer Ashburnham (25 Apr 1866 – 11 Sep 1919)
- John Ashburnham (19 Aug 1873 – 7 Sep 1873)
- Editha Ashburnham (7 Sep 1878 – 20 May 1963)
