= Thomas Pelham (of Lewes, senior) =

English politician (c.1678–1759)

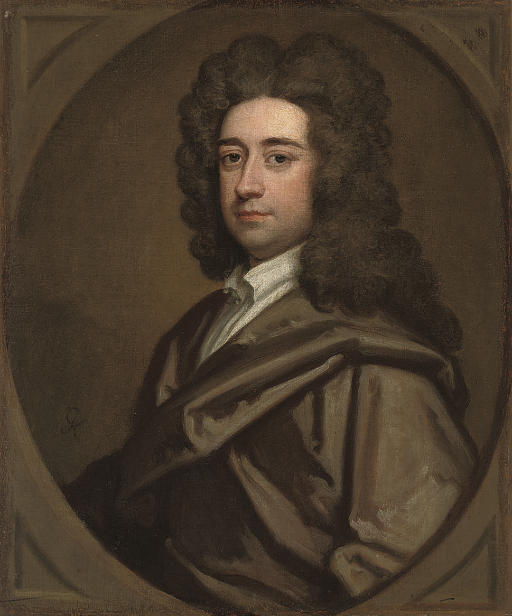

Member of the British Parliament for Lewes
- In office 1705–1741
- Succeeded by: Thomas Pelham

Personal details
- Born: c. 1678
- Died: 1759
- Spouse: Elizabeth Pelham
- Children: 12, including Thomas Pelham and Henry Cressett Pelham
- Parent: Sir Nicholas Pelham (father)
- Education: St Edmund Hall, Oxford

Thomas Pelham (c.1678–1759) was an English politician, a member of the Pelham family of Sussex. Returned on the family's electoral interest at Lewes in 1705, he provided a reliable Whig vote in the House of Commons, and a rather more sporadic attendance on the Board of Trade. Due to his neglect of the family electoral interest, he was nearly turned out in the 1734 election, and stood down in favor of his eldest son at the next election in 1741.

== Early life and family ==
Thomas was born about 1678, the eldest son of Sir Nicholas Pelham. He matriculated at St Edmund Hall, Oxford on 3 July 1693, and entered Gray's Inn in 1696. In 1704, he married his cousin Elizabeth, the daughter of Henry Pelham. They had eight sons and four daughters:

- Thomas Pelham (c.1705–1743)
- Henry, Charles, Henry, and James Pelham, all died young without children
- John Pelham (d. 1786)
- Nicholas Pelham, died without children
- Henry Cressett Pelham (1729?–1803)
- Frances Pelham, married Edward Cressett
- Elizabeth Pelham, married William Hay of Glyndebourne
- Margaret Pelham, married Sir William Ashburnham, 4th Baronet
- Grace Pelham

== Political career ==
The Pelham family's ownership of property near and within Lewes had given them a very strong electoral interest there; in addition, the Pelhams were generally Whigs, appealing to local Nonconformist sentiment. Thomas's father, Sir Nicholas, had sat in Parliament for the borough since 1702 on the family interest, when his half-nephew, Thomas Pelham of Laughton, chose to represent Sussex instead. Sir Nicholas gave way for his son, the younger Thomas Pelham, in the 1705 English general election, with the family interest supporting Thomas and Richard Payne, the sitting member and a local Whig. Unusually, three other candidates contested the election: the Whigs Thomas Fagg and his relative John Spence, and the Tory Nathaniel Trayton, steward of the Duke of Norfolk's estates in Sussex. Pelham topped the poll, with Payne coming second and Fagg third, the other candidates gaining only a few votes.

In Parliament, Pelham was classified by his contemporaries as a Low Church Whig, voting steadily in support of Government. He voted for the impeachment of Henry Sacheverell in 1710. In the 1710 election, Trayton, who had bought the manor of Southover nearby in 1709, again contested the seat, but was defeated by Pelham and his fellow Whig Peter Gott. He remained a consistent Whig after the Hanoverian succession, and in 1715, obtained office as a commissioner for stating Army debts, worth £500 a year. Through the influence of his half-cousin's son, the Whig grandee the Duke of Newcastle, he was able to exchange this for a seat as a Lord of Trade, worth £1,000 a year, under the First Stanhope–Sunderland ministry. His only reported speech was made in 1720, against Sir Robert Walpole's motion to fix the rate for conversion of government securities to South Sea Company stock.

While he attended Board of Trade meetings only sporadically, he was a regular and dependable Government vote in the House. However, Pelham seems to have taken little care to cultivate the family interest at Lewes. Newcastle's first cousin, a younger Thomas Pelham, was brought in for the other seat in 1727, but his drunkenness and wild talk during visits to Lewes were also damaging. Matters came to a head in 1733, after the failure of Walpole's excise proposals, which were ill-received in Sussex. Thomas Sergison, a local landowner with Tory support, joined with Nathaniel Garland, representing the Dissenters, to challenge the Pelhams. After a visit to Sussex in the summer of 1733, Newcastle wrote that his kinsman 'is as unpopular as possible and has personally disobliged the whole town'. Pelham's son-in-law, William Hay, reported to Newcastle in November that Pelham had been utterly inactive in securing the support of Lewes voters and had not made a personal canvass of the town. The Pelham interests had obtained the election of their own candidates as high constables (the returning officers of Lewes) in October 1733, and their partiality allowed the two Pelhams to eke out a narrow victory in the 1734 election, with the elder Thomas Pelham beating Garland by only eight votes. The younger Thomas Pelham died of drink in 1737 and was replaced by John Morley Trevor; the elder Thomas Pelham stood down, in exchange for a pension of £800 per year, and allowed his son, yet another Thomas Pelham, to join Trevor on the family interest at the 1741 election and take up his seat at the Board of Trade.

== Later years ==
In any case, the elder Thomas had succeeded his father, Sir Nicholas, in the family estate of Catsfield in 1739. The younger Thomas died in 1743; the elder Thomas outlived him by sixteen years, and was buried at Lewes on 10 December 1759. His estate went to his eldest surviving son, John.

Parliament of England
| Preceded by Richard Payne; Sir Nicholas Pelham | Member of Parliament for Lewes; 1705–1707; With: Richard Payne | Succeeded by Parliament of Great Britain |
Parliament of Great Britain
| Preceded by Parliament of England | Member of Parliament for Lewes; 1708–1741; With: Peter Gott 1708, 1710–2; Samuel Gott 1708–10; John Morley Trevor 1712–9; Philip Yorke 1719–22; Henry Pelham 1722–5; Sir Nicholas Pelham 1726–7; Thomas Pelham 1727–37; John Morley Trevor 1737–41 | Succeeded by John Morley Trevor; Thomas Pelham |
