= Thomas Pelham (of Lewes, junior) =

British politician (c.1705–1743)

Thomas Pelham (c.1705 – 1 August 1743) was an English politician and diplomat. The patronage of his kinsman, the Duke of Newcastle, obtained for him an appointment as secretary to British diplomats in France, and a Parliamentary seat at Hastings, from 1728 to 1741. In the latter year, he took up his father's seat at Lewes and his seat at the Board of Trade, but died two years later of tuberculosis.

== Biography ==
Thomas Pelham was born in about 1705, the eldest son of Thomas Pelham, of Lewes, and his wife Elizabeth, the daughter of Henry Pelham, of Stanmer. He was admitted to Corpus Christi College, Cambridge in 1722.

His second cousin once removed, the Duke of Newcastle, brought him into Parliament at Hastings in 1728, where Thomas Townshend had left a vacancy by opting to sit for Cambridge University. Newcastle's influence also gained Thomas a place in the diplomatic corps, where he served as secretary to the British ambassadors to the Congress of Soissons from 1728 to 1730, and then as secretary at the British embassy in Paris until 1741. These duties did not keep him from a diligent attendance in Parliament, where he rarely missed recorded votes.

On 10 May 1738, Pelham married Sarah Gould, the daughter of John Gould of Hackney, and sister of Nathaniel Gould. They had two sons, Henry and Thomas.

At the 1741 election, Pelham stood at Lewes for the seat formerly held by his father, whose neglect of the family electoral interest had nearly cost him his seat in 1734. He and the incumbent, John Morley Trevor, successfully stood off a repeated challenge by Nathaniel Sergison. Pelham also received his father's seat as a Lord of Trade. Not long after, the younger Pelham began to suffer from tuberculosis, and died of that disease on 1 August 1743, during his father's lifetime.

Parliament of Great Britain
| Preceded by Sir William Ashburnham; Thomas Townshend | Member of Parliament for Hastings; 1728–1741; With: Sir William Ashburnham | Succeeded by James Pelham; Andrew Stone |
| Preceded by Thomas Pelham; John Morley Trevor | Member of Parliament for Lewes; 1741–1743; With: John Morley Trevor | Succeeded by Sir John Shelley; Sir Francis Poole |
