= Sir William Ashburnham, 5th Baronet =

British politician (1739–1823)

Sir William Ashburnham, 5th Baronet (5 March 1739 – 21 August 1823) was a British politician.

Baptised at St Anne's Church, Soho on 29 March 1739, he was the eldest surviving son of the Rt Revd Sir William Ashburnham, 4th Baronet, Bishop of Chichester and his wife Margaret Pelham, daughter of Thomas Pelham. Ashburnham was educated at Corpus Christi College, Cambridge. He succeeded his father as baronet in 1797.

He entered the British House of Commons in 1761, sitting as a Member of Parliament (MP) for Hastings until 1774. Ashburnham was appointed Deputy Keeper of the Great Wardrobe in 1765, a post held until 1782. He was High Sheriff of Sussex in 1803.

In April 1766, Ashburnham married Alicia Woodgate, daughter of Reverend Francis Woodgate at St Clement Danes Church in London and had by her four sons and a daughter. Ashburnham died aged 84 at his residence Broomham Place in Guestling and was buried at Broomham in Sussex. He was succeeded in the baronetcy by his sons William and John successively.

== Arms ==
Coat of arms of Sir William Ashburnham, 5th Baronet
Crest Out of a ducal coronet Or an ash tree Proper Escutcheon Gules a fess between six mullets Argent Motto Will God, And I Shall

Parliament of Great Britain
Preceded by Andrew Stone; James Pelham	Member of Parliament for Hastings; 1761–1774; With: James Brudenell 1761–1768; Samuel Martin 1768–1774	Succeeded by Henry Temple; Charles Jenkinson
Baronetage of England
Preceded by William Ashburnham	Baronet (of Broomham); 1797–1823	Succeeded by William Ashburnham
