= Hastings Town Hall =

Municipal building in Hastings, East Sussex, England

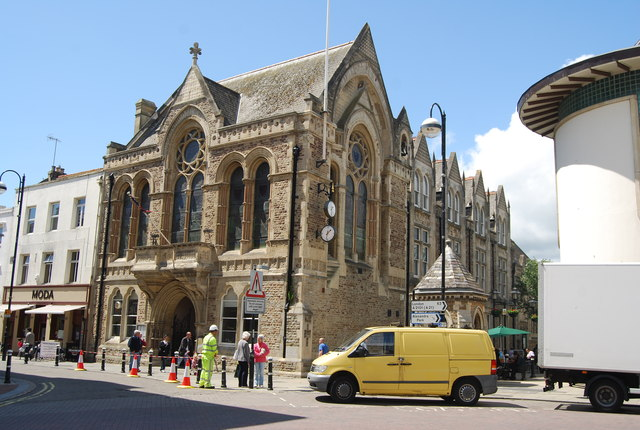
- Hastings Town Hall

- Shown in East Sussex
- 50.8563°N 0.5806°E
- Location: Queen's Road, Hastings

History
- Built: 1881

Site notes
- Architect: Henry Ward
- Architectural style: English Gothic style

Listed Building – Grade II
- Official name: Town Hall
- Designated: 13 January 1999
- Reference no.: 1245060

Hastings Town Hall is a municipal building in Queen's Road, Hastings, East Sussex, England. The town hall, which was the meeting place of Hastings Borough Council, is a Grade II listed building.

== History ==
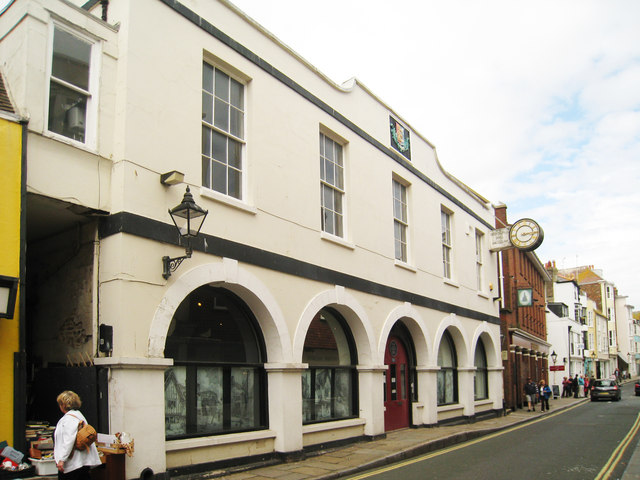
Hastings Old Town Hall (completed 1823)

The first town hall in the town was built at the expense of local members of parliament, John Pulteney and Peter Gott, in the High Street in 1700. It was replaced by a stuccoed structure which was built on the same site and completed in 1823. It was arcaded on the ground floor to allow markets to be held, with an assembly room on the first floor. (Note: The old town hall became an antique furniture shop, known as Reeves & Son in 1881. It went on to become a museum and library in March 1949, a museum of local history in July 1959 and, after an extensive refurbishment supported by the Heritage Lottery Fund, it was re-opened as a local history museum again in 1999.)

In the 1870s, following significant population growth largely associated with the seaside tourism industry, civic leaders decided to procure a more substantial town hall: the site they selected was a triangular plot in Queen's Road which had been occupied by a row of terraced houses.

The new building was the subject of a design competition which was won by the local architect, Henry Ward. It was designed in the English Gothic style and officially opened by the mayor, Councillor W. F. Revill, on 7 September 1881. The design involved a symmetrical main frontage with three bays facing onto Queen's Road; the central bay featured an arched doorway, a stone balcony and a pair of tall stained glass lancet windows with bar tracery with cusped circles (with bars radiating from a central rose window) on the first floor with a gable above. (Note: The style of tracery is derived from that employed at Reims Cathedral.) The doorway and the windows on the first floor, including those in the outer bays which also employed paired lancet windows, were all flanked by colonettes. Four carved panels were erected on the eastern side of the building illustrating "Hastings Fishermen boarding French Pirates", "The Landing of the French and their Defeat", "Queen Elizabeth Granting the Charter to the Corporation" and "Cinque Port Ships Going to meet the Armada". Internally, the principal rooms were the council chamber and the mayor's parlour.

The area became a county borough, with the town hall as its headquarters in 1888. The mayor, Councillor E. Armitage Hocking, received the colours of the 5th Battalion, Royal Sussex Regiment at the town hall on 5 August 1914 before the unit was deployed to France at the start of the First World War, and the then mayor, Councillor William Perrins, set out from the town hall to meet King George V on his visit to the town near the end of the war on 30 August 1918.

The town hall continued to serve as the headquarters of the county borough council for much of the 20th century and remained the local seat of government after the formation of the enlarged Hastings Borough Council in 1974. The borough council subsequently established modern municipal offices at Aquila House in Breeds Place (renamed Muriel Matters House in 2016); however, following an extensive refurbishment, the town hall was re-opened as the local register office in March 2016.
