= Sir Robert Parker, 1st Baronet =

English politician

Sir Robert Parker, 1st Baronet (ca. 1655 – 30 November 1691) of Ratton, Sussex was an English politician. He was a Member of Parliament (MP) for Hastings from 1679 to 1685.

He was made a baronet on 22 May 1674.

Parliament of England
Preceded by Denny Ashburnham; Edmund Waller	Member of Parliament for Hastings; 1679–1685; With: John Ashburnham 1679–1681; Thomas Mun 1681–1685	Succeeded by Denny Ashburnham; John Ashburnham
Baronetage of England
New creation	Baronet (of Ratton); 1674–1691	Succeeded by George Parker
