= John Ashburnham, 1st Baron Ashburnham =

English politician

John Ashburnham, 1st Baron Ashburnham (15 January 1656 – 21 January 1710) was an English landowner and politician.

Ashburnham was the son of William Ashburnham and the grandson of John Ashburnham. His mother was the Honourable Elizabeth, daughter of John Poulett, 1st Baron Poulett. He sat as member of parliament for Hastings from 1679 to 1681 and again from 1685 to 1689. As a baron of the Cinque Ports he was one of the holders of the canopy at the coronation of James II in 1685 and coronation of William and Mary in 1688. He is thought to have become disillusioned with James and to have welcomed the accession of William and Mary. In 1689 he was raised to the peerage as Baron Ashburnham, of Ashburnham in the County of Sussex. He later served as Custos Rotulorum of Breconshire from 1702 to 1710.

Lord Ashburnham married Bridget, daughter and heiress of Sir Charles Vaughan of Porthammel House, Breconshire, at Westminster Abbey in 1677, from which substantial estates in Wales came into the family. They had several children. He died at Southampton Street, Bloomsbury, London, in January 1710, aged 54, and was succeeded in the barony by his eldest son, William. William was in his turn succeeded by his younger brother, John, who was created Earl of Ashburnham in 1730. Lady Ashburnham died in May 1719.

Parliament of England
Preceded by Denny Ashburnham; Edmund Waller	Member of Parliament for Hastings; 1679–1681; With: Sir Robert Parker, Bt 1679–1685	Succeeded by Sir Robert Parker, Bt; Thomas Mun
Preceded by Sir Robert Parker, Bt; Thomas Mun	Member of Parliament for Hastings; 1685–1689; With: Denny Ashburnham 1685–1689; Thomas Mun 1689–1690	Succeeded by Thomas Mun; John Beaumont
Honorary titles
Preceded by The Lord Herbert of Chirbury	Custos Rotulorum of Brecknockshire; 1702–1710	Succeeded by The Lord Ashburnham
Peerage of England
New creation	Baron Ashburnham; 1689–1710	Succeeded by William Ashburnham
