= Nathaniel Tomkins =

English Member of Parliament

Nathaniel Tomkins (baptised 25 October 1584 – 5 July 1643) was an English Member of Parliament. He represented Carlisle and Christchurch.

Tomkins was born the son of the rector in Harpole, Northamptonshire and attended Magdalen College, Oxford. He obtained his BA in 1602 and MA three years later. It was in Oxford where he met Sir John Digby. The latter took notice of him and then appointed him as the tutor of his oldest son. Undoubtedly, it was Digby, who had influence at Court, who provided Tomkins with a pension of £102 per year in 1613. The following year, during his visit to London, Digby arranged for Tomkins' return to Carlisle to defend the queen's interest.

He represented Carlisle in Parliament from 1614 to 1620, when he was replaced by Sir Henry Vane, before being returned for the seat of Christchurch the following year. He briefly represented Ilchester in 1624 before handing the seat over to his brother-in-law, Edmund Waller and resuming his position in Christchurch. Tomkins was appointed clerk to the Duchy of Cornwall Council in 1625. However, when he returned to the duchy borough of St Mawes, he chose to sit for Christchurch on 11 July 1625. He continued to represent Christchurch until 1629. In 1628 he served as a clerk to Queen Henrietta Maria’s Council.

In 1643, Tomkins was implicated in "Waller's Plot", an attempt to force an armed rising against Parliament during the English Civil War. He was arrested and hanged outside his home on Fetter Lane on 5 July 1643, aged 58.
