= John Pulteney =

English lawyer and politician

John Pulteney (before 1668 – 2 May 1726), of St James's, Westminster and Harefield, Middlesex, was an English lawyer and Whig politician who sat in the English and British House of Commons from 1695 to 1710.

== Early life ==
Pulteney was the son of Sir William Pulteney, and his wife Grace Corbet, daughter of Sir John Corbet, 1st Baronet, of Stoke, Shropshire. He was educated at Westminster School under Dr Busby. He married before 1674 Lucy Colville of Northamptonshire. He was admitted at Inner Temple in 1676 and matriculated at Christ Church, Oxford in 1677. He was called to the Bar in 1682.

== Career ==
Pulteney was nominated as deputy-lieutenant of Middlesex in 1689. He had no previous experience in the higher levels of government when he was appointed by Lord Shrewsbury as under-secretary of the Southern Department in 1689, holding the post to June 1690. He was then appointed under-secretary of the Northern Department from December 1690 to March 1692. When Lord Sydney became one of the lord's justices in Ireland, in October 1690, he named Pulteney as their secretary from October to December 1690. Pulteney accompanied Sydney on the Flanders campaign with the king in the summer of 1691. In March 1692, Sydney took office as lord lieutenant of Ireland, nominated Pulteney one of his secretaries, and secured for him the place as clerk of the council in Ireland at £400 p.a. for life. Pulteney was returned as an MP in the Parliament of Ireland from 1692 to 1693. He also served Lord Sydney at the Board of Ordnance from March 1692 to March 1693. Lord Sydney left the lord lieutenancy in March 1693, and Pulteney was almost immediately reappointed in March to his former post as under-secretary of the northern department, which he held to 1695. In 1694 he was a Commissioner for the Million Act.

At the 1695 English general election Pulteney was returned unopposed as Whig Member of Parliament for Hastings, as nominee of Lord Sydney who was now Lord Warden of the Cinque Ports. Pulteney signed the Association promptly and voted in March with the Court for fixing the price of guineas at 22 shillings. He was appointed registrar to the Commissioners for forfeited estates for the year 1696 to 1697. He took an active part in the attainder of Sir John Fenwick in November 1696. At the 1698 English general election, he retained his seat at Hastings in a contest. He spoke and voted against the third reading of the disbanding bill on 18 January 1699. In February 1701 he was promoted to the more remunerative ordnance office of clerk of the deliveries with an annual salary of almost £1,000. He was returned again at the two general elections of 1701. At the 1702 English general election he was returned unopposed again for Hastings. He lost his place at the ordnance office in 1703. After the 1705 English general election, when he was returned again for Hastings, he voted for the Court candidate for Speaker on 25 October 1705. He supported the Court on the 'place clause' in the Regency bill on 18 January 1706. In 1707, he was one of the moderate Whigs appointed to the Board of Trade, with a salary of £1,000 a year. He was returned as a Whig at the 1708 British general election. He took part in proceedings relating to the African trade early in 1709. He voted for the naturalization of the Palatines in 1709 and supported the introduction of a new Africa bill on 18 February 1710. He also voted for the impeachment of Dr Sacheverell. He was defeated at the 1710 British general election butretained his place a Lord of Trade until 1711.

In 1700, Pulteney and Peter Gott funded the building of Hastings Town Hall.

In 1714, Pulteney was appointed as a Commissioner of the Board of Customs with a salary of £1,000 to 1722, and from 1715, was a member of the Commission for Building Fifty New Churches. He stood again for Hastings at the 1722 British general election, supported by the Duke of Newcastle, but lost by a single vote. He was compensated by the incoming Townshend–Walpole ministry with the post of surveyor-general of crown lands.

== Death and legacy ==
Pulteney died on 23 May 1726. By his wife Lucy, he was father to Daniel Pulteney, whose granddaughter Laura also became Countess of Bath. He was uncle to William Pulteney, later Earl of Bath.

Parliament of England
| Preceded by Peter Gott; John Beaumont | Member of Parliament for Hastings; 1695–1707; With: Robert Austen 1695-1698; Peter Gott 1698-1701; John Mounsher 1701-1702; Hon. William Ashburnham 1702-1707 | Succeeded by Parliament of Great Britain |
Parliament of Great Britain
| Preceded by Parliament of England | Member of Parliament for Hastings; 1707–1710; With: Hon. William Ashburnham 1707-1710; John Ashburnham 1710 | Succeeded by Sir William Ashburnham; Sir Joseph Martin |
