= St Laurence's Church, Guestling =

- St Laurence's Church, Guestling
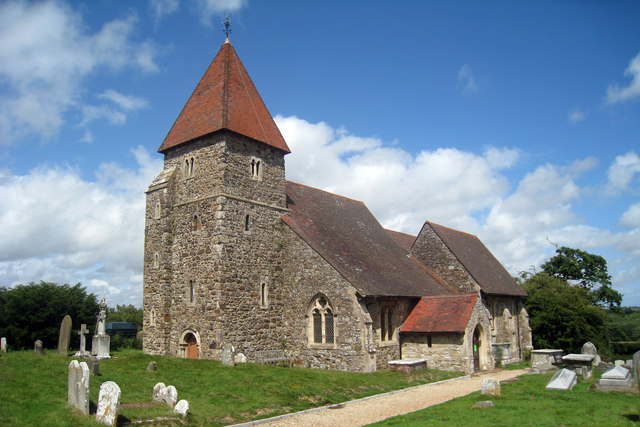
- St Laurence's Church, Guestling
- 50°53′59″N 0°38′14″E
- Country: England
- Denomination: Church of England
- Previous denomination: Roman Catholicism
- Website: www.guestlingchurch.org.uk

Listed Building – Grade I
- Official name: The Parish Church of St Laurence
- Designated: 3 August 1961
- Reference no.: 1233969

The Parish Church of St Laurence is a Church of England church and listed building in the village of Guestling in the Rother District of East Sussex. The church was founded in Saxon times, though the current building consists of a Norman tower and a nave and chancel which were originally 13th-century but were largely rebuilt between 1884 and 1891. It is listed as Grade I for the tower only.
