= John Buckner (bishop) =

18th–19th century Anglican bishop of Chichester

The Right Reverend John Buckner
- Bishop of Chichester
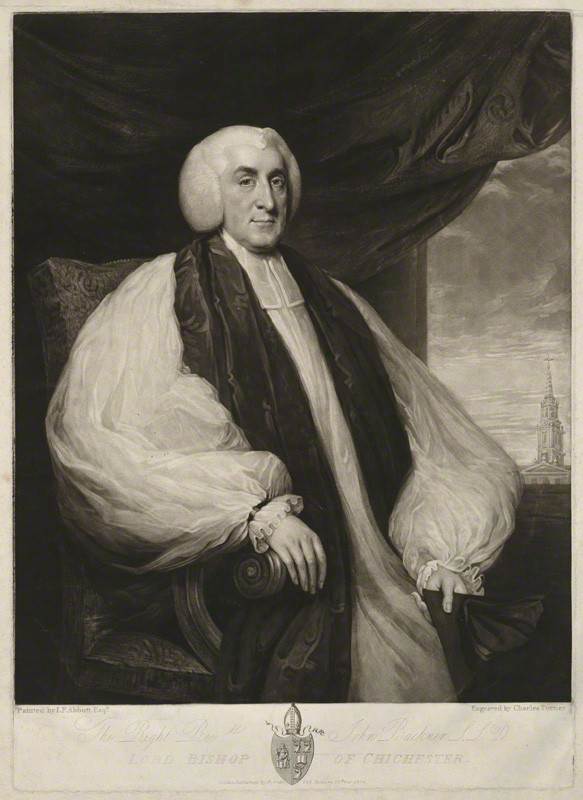
- Church: Church of England
- Diocese: Chichester
- Elected: 1797
- Term ended: 1824 (died)
- Predecessor: Sir William Ashburnham
- Successor: Robert Carr

Personal details
- Born: baptised 12 June 1734 Goodwood House, Sussex
- Died: 1 May 1824 (aged 89) Chichester, Sussex
- Buried: Chichester Cathedral
- Denomination: Anglican
- Spouse: Elizabeth Heron (m. 1768)
- Education: Charterhouse School; Clare College, Cambridge

John Buckner (bapt. 12 June 1734 – 1 May 1824) was an Anglican clergyman who served in the Church of England as the Bishop of Chichester from 1797 to 1824.

== Early life ==
Buckner was born at Goodwood House, Sussex (the family seat of the Dukes of Richmond), and baptised at Boxgrove on 12 June 1734. He was the elder son of Richard Buckner (died 1777), steward to Charles Lennox, 2nd Duke of Richmond, and his wife Mary Saunders (died 1772). His younger brother Charles Buckner became an Admiral in the Royal Navy.

Bishop Buckner's 1824 obituary in the London Magazine noted that he and his brother Charles had "owed their advancement in life" to a close relationship with the Dukes of Richmond. Indeed, it was speculated in a 2011 article that their father Richard might have been an illegitimate son of the 1st Duke of Richmond, himself an illegitimate son of King Charles II. Traditional sources though hold that Richard Buckner was an immigrant from Westphalia.

The Duke of Richmond nominated John Buckner to a foundation scholarship at Charterhouse School at the age of 12, giving him access to a free education. He matriculated at Clare College, Cambridge in 1751, graduating B.A. 1755, M.A. 1765; he additionally received a Lambeth LL.D. in 1787. He was ordained a deacon in 1756 and a priest in 1758.

== Career ==
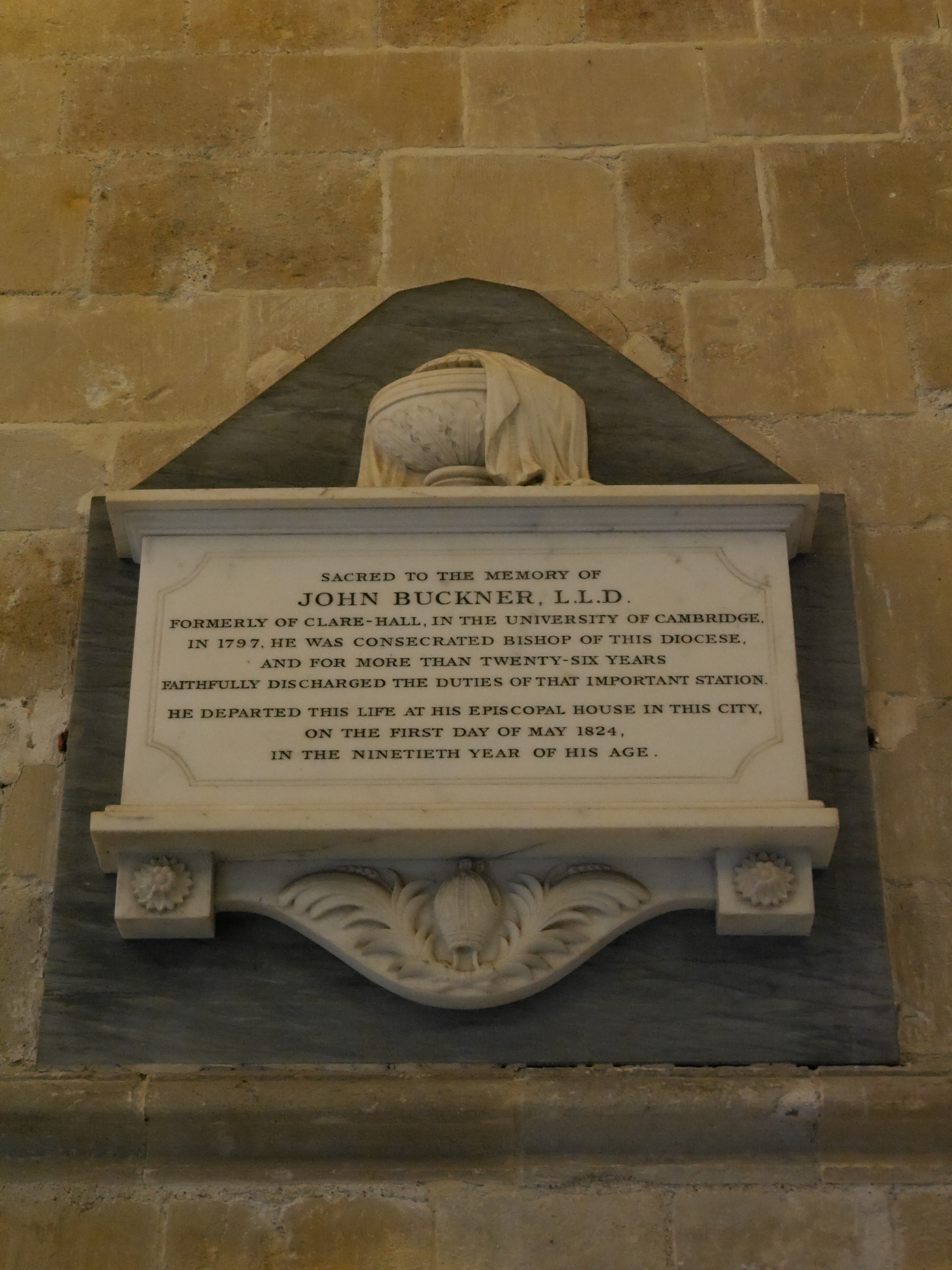
Memorial, Chichester Cathedral

He held the following positions:

- Chaplain to the 3rd Duke of Richmond at the Siege of Havana, 1762
- Vicar of Lyminster, Sussex, 1762
- Rector of West Stoke, Sussex, 1764
- Rector of Southwick, Sussex, 1766
- Prebendary of Chichester Cathedral, 1768
  - Prebendary of Firle, 1768–1771
  - Prebendary of Eartham, 1771–1797
- Vicar of Westhampnett, Sussex, 1768
- Vicar of Eartham, Sussex, 1771
- Vicar of Boxgrove, Sussex, 1772
- Rector of St Giles-in-the-Fields, London, 1788
- Rector of Newdigate, Surrey, 1788
- Archdeacon of Chichester, 1792–1797
- Bishop of Chichester, 1797–1824

Buckner had a house in Wigmore Street in London. Granted Arms jointly with his brother in 1804. The family vault is in the south transept of the cathedral, however this is believed to have been damaged and/or obscured when the cathedral tower fell down early in the 19th century. There are portraits of the bishop at Goodwood (by George Romney), in the Rector's Vestry of St Giles-in-the-Fields and in the Bishop's Palace, Chichester.

It is recorded that Bishop Buckner, with the aid of a very considerable sum of money from his predecessor's estate, "applied a liberal addition of his own monies to render the house (palace) fit for episcopal residence; and his improvements were certainly dictated by judgement and taste."

He was nominated Bishop of the Diocese of Chichester by King George III on 2 October, received Congé d'élire and letter missive on 11 October, elected on 27 October, and Royal assent on 10 November 1797. He was consecrated on 4 March and enthroned at Chichester Cathedral on 28 March 1798. He died in office on 1 May 1824.

== Family ==
On 6 December 1768 at Portsmouth, Hampshire, he married Elizabeth Heron, daughter of John Vining Heron and his wife Frances Leake. The two did not have any children.

Church of England titles
| Preceded by William Ashburnham | Bishop of Chichester; 1797–1824 | Succeeded by Robert Carr |
