= William Lowndes (1652–1724) =

English Whig politician

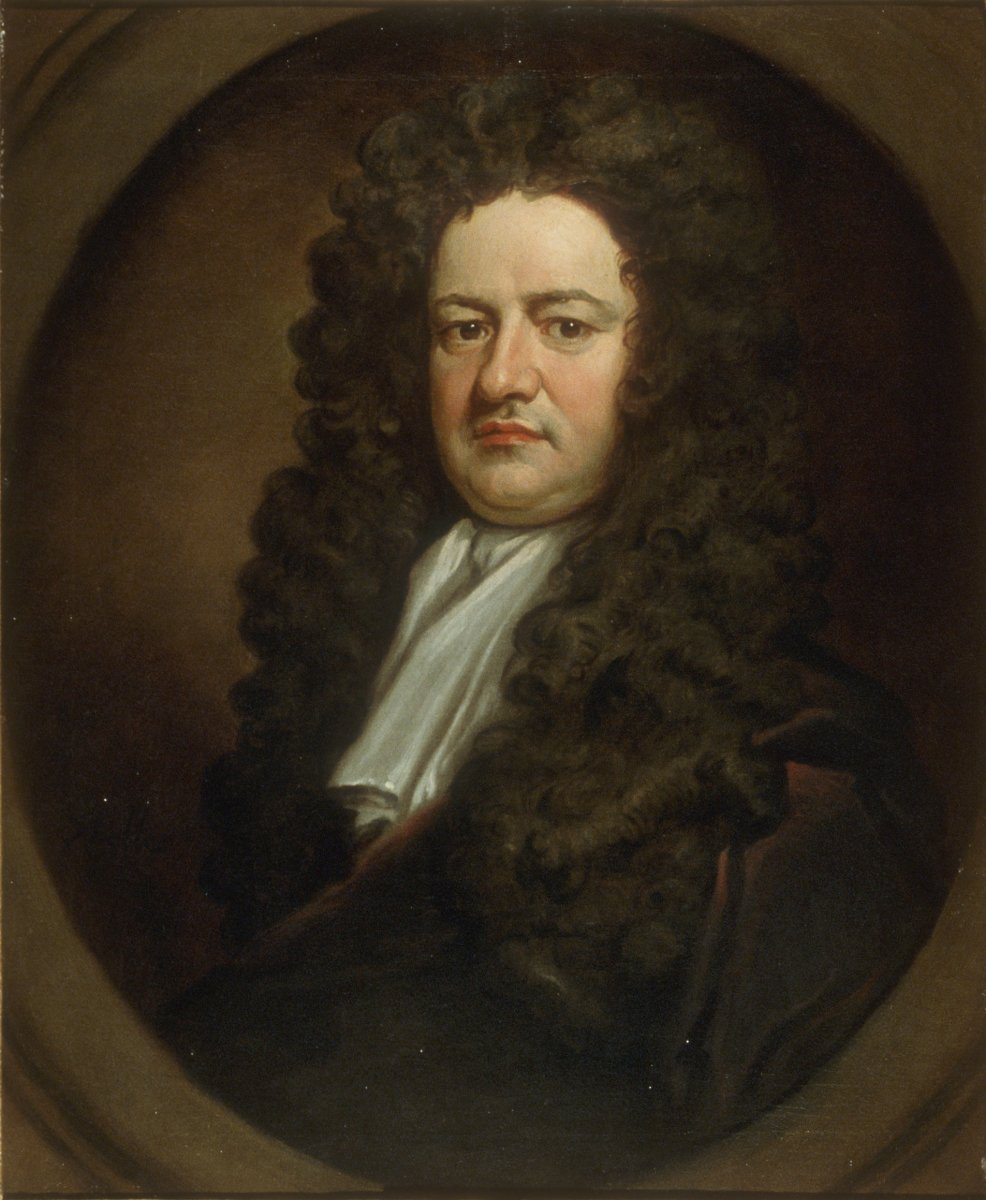
Portrait of Lowndes by Godfrey Kneller

William Lowndes (1 November 1652 – 20 January 1724) was an English Whig politician who sat in the English and British House of Commons from 1695 to 1724. He served as Secretary to the Treasury during the reigns of King William III and Queen Anne.

== Early life ==
Lowndes was born in Winslow, Buckinghamshire on 1 November 1652. He was the son of Robert Lowndes and his second wife Elizabeth FitzWilliam. His father was descended from the Lowndes of Overton, Smallwood, and his grandfather had moved south to Buckinghamshire; other relatives settled in the Province of South Carolina. Lowndes was educated at the free school in Buckingham. He joined HM Treasury as a clerk, and eventually acquired ownership of Bury Manor in Chesham in 1687.

== Political career ==
Lowndes was returned unopposed as a Member of Parliament for Seaford in Sussex, a "limb" of the Cinque Ports, at the 1695 general election. He was returned unopposed for Seaford for every election until 1715. He served as chairman of the Committee of Ways and Means, becoming known throughout Britain as "Ways and Means Lowndes".

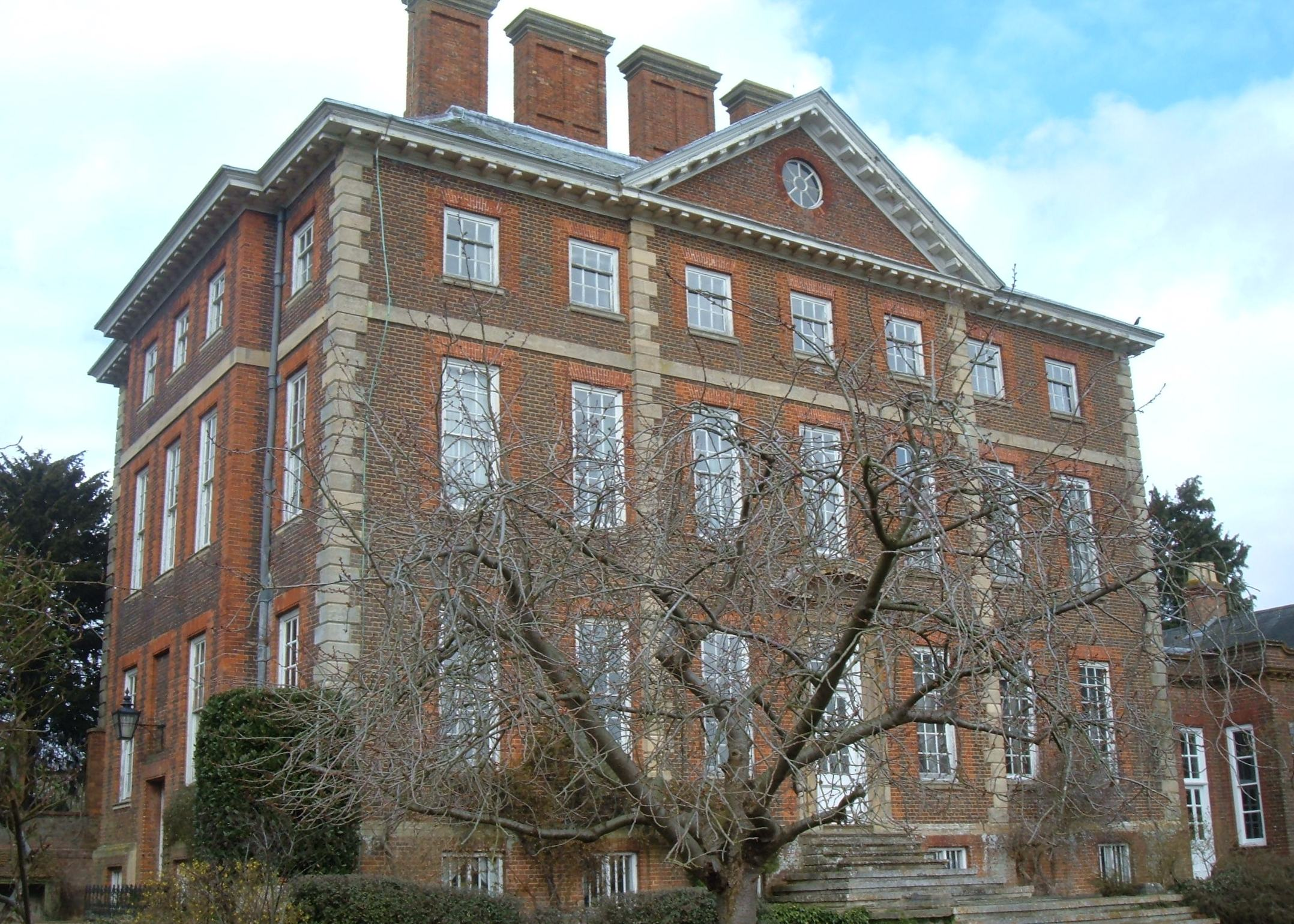
Winslow Hall

Lowndes also became Secretary to the Treasury in 1695. His Report containing an essay for the amendment of the silver coins, written during the crisis of 1695, was answered by John Locke, whose views on the reform of the currency prevailed. He became wealthy as a result of holding office in the Treasury. In 1700, he built Winslow Hall in Winslow, Buckinghamshire.

Around this period Lowndes was painted twice by Sir Godfrey Kneller (1646–1723), and by contemporary painter Richard Philips (1681–1741) whose portrait is in the collection of the Bank of England.

Lowndes originated the funded system and rose to great power and influence in Parliament. In recognition of his service, Queen Anne conferred upon him the office of Auditor of the Land Revenue for life, in reversion to his sons, with an augmentation to his coat of arms.

In 1712 Lowndes rebuilt Chesham's manor house, The Bury, immediately to the south of St Mary's Church, Chesham. The building still stands today, and currently serves as an office building.

At the 1715 general election Lowndes was returned unopposed as MP for St Mawes in Cornwall in the first Parliament of King George I, but stood unsuccessfully for Westminster in 1722. Shortly afterwards, he was returned in a by-election on 27 October 1722 as MP for East Looe, also in Cornwall, after that constituency was vacated by Horace Walpole when he decided to stand for Great Yarmouth instead.

In 1723 Lowndes bought the freehold reversion of leasehold property he owned in St. James's and Knightsbridge, in areas now known as Lowndes Square and Lowndes Street.

The expression "Take care of the pence, and the pounds will take care of themselves" is attributed to him.

== Death and legacy ==
Lowndes' death was announced in the House of Commons by Walpole, saying The House had lost a very useful Member, and the public as able and honest a servant as ever the Crown had.

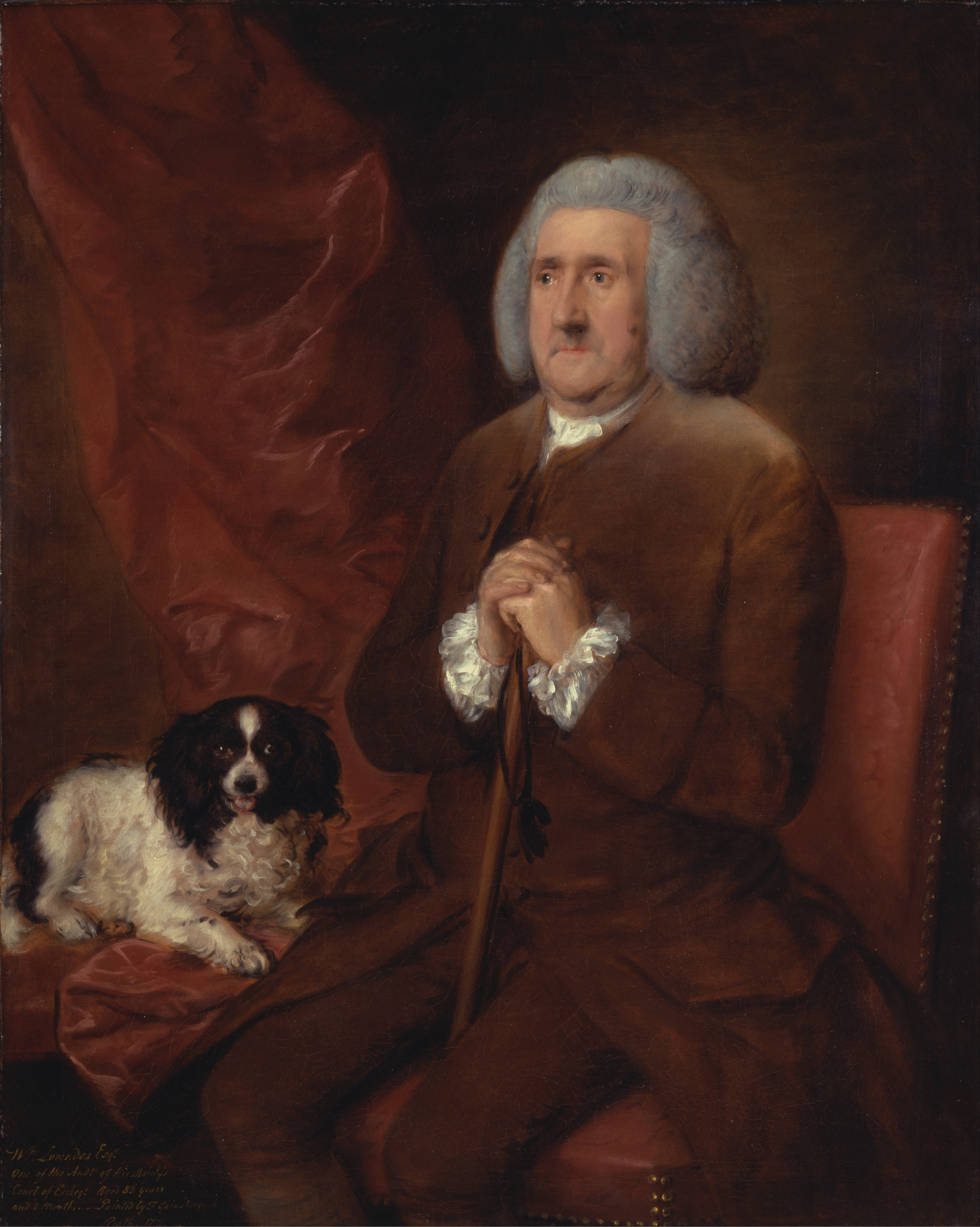
His son, also named William (1687–1775), by Thomas Gainsborough (1727–1788)

Lowndes married four times:

1. Elizabeth Harsnett, daughter of Sir Roger Harsnett (she died in 1680)
2. Jane Hopper in 1683 (she died in 1685)
3. Elizabeth Martyn, daughter of Richard Martyn (she died 1689)
4. Rebecca Shales, daughter of John Shales. Rebecca was a descendant of Henry Pole, 1st Baron Montagu, the eldest son of the Margaret Pole, 8th Countess of Salisbury; she was the daughter of George Plantagenet, Duke of Clarence, and so niece of King Edward IV.

Lowndes had children with each of his wives, 25 children in all. His offspring were also fruitful: one son had 16 children, including four sets of twins in four years; a grandson had 10 children.

He was succeeded by his son Richard, who inherited Winslow Hall and became both High Sheriff and MP for Buckinghamshire.

William Lowndes, a son by his third wife, followed him as an Auditor of His Majesty's Court of Exchequer in the 1760s.

In 2020, Lowndes was a character in the Audible Assassin's Creed Podcast, Assassin's Creed Gold. Lowndes was voiced by British voice actor Nicholas Le Prevost.

== See also ==
- William Chaloner

Parliament of England
| Preceded by William Campion; Henry Pelham | Member of Parliament for Seaford; 1695–1707; With: William Campion 1695–98, 1698–1701; Sir William Thomas 1698, 1701–02, 1702–06; Thomas Chowne 1702; George Naylor 1706–07 | Succeeded by Parliament of Great Britain |
Parliament of Great Britain
| Preceded by Parliament of England | Member of Parliament for Seaford; 1707–1715; With: George Naylor 1707–10,1713–15; Thomas Chowne 1710–13 | Succeeded by George Naylor; Sir William Ashburnham |
| Preceded by Edward Rolt; Francis Scobell | Member of Parliament for St Mawes; 1715–1722; With: John Chetwynd | Succeeded by Sidney Godolphin; Samuel Travers |
| Preceded by John Smith; Horatio Walpole | Member of Parliament for East Looe; 1722–1724; With: John Smith 1722–24; Viscount Malpas 1724 | Succeeded by Viscount Malpas; Sir Henry Hoghton |
