= Robert Austen (c. 1672–1728) =

English politician

Robert Austen (c. 1672 – c. August 1728) was an English politician. He was a Member of Parliament (MP) for Winchelsea from 1701 to 1702 and for Hastings from 1695 to 1698.

Parliament of England
Preceded by Peter Gott; John Beaumont	Member of Parliament for Hastings; 1695–1698; With: John Pulteney	Succeeded by John Pulteney; Peter Gott
Preceded by Thomas Newport; Robert Bristow	Member of Parliament for Winchelsea; 1701–1702; With: John Hayes	Succeeded by George Clarke; James Hayes
