= Peter Gott =

English ironmaster and Whig politician

Peter Gott (22 May 1653 – 16 April 1712), of Stanmer, Sussex and Hatton Garden, London, was an English ironmaster and Whig politician who sat in the House of Commons between 1690 and 1712.

== Early life ==
Gott was the eldest son of Samuel Gott, ironmaster of Battle, Sussex, and his wife Joan Farnden, daughter of Peter Farnden of Sedlescombe, Sussex. He was admitted at Gray's Inn in 1670. He succeeded his father to his estates and iron workings in 1671. By licence dated 16 July 1677, he married his cousin Martha Western, the daughter of Thomas Western of St Dunstan-in-the-East, ironmonger. In 1685 he was a baron of the Cinque Ports when he helped carry the canopy over the Queen at the coronation. In 1690, with the resumption of war, he became one of the major suppliers of iron ordnance to the government.

== Career ==
Gott was Sheriff of Sussex for the year 1688 to 1689. At the 1689 English general election, he stood for Parliament at Rye and Hastings and was defeated. He was returned in a contest as Member of Parliament (MP) for Hastings at the 1690 English general election. He did not stand in 1695. In 1698 he became a director of the New East India Company and was a director of the Bank of England to 1700. He was returned again as MP for Hastings at the 1698 English general election. Though inactive in Parliament, he was classified as a Court supporter and later as a supporter of the Whig Junto. In 1700, Gott and John Pulteney funded the building of Hastings Town Hall. He was returned at the first general election of 1701. At the second general election of 1701, he stood instead at Winchelsea, but was defeated and his petition was not successful.

Gott purchased the manor of Stanmer for £8,000 and made it his principal seat. He also held property in Rye and elsewhere in Sussex. This gave him sufficient electoral interest to stand for Sussex at the 1708 British general election. He also stood at Lewes, and was returned as MP for both constituencies. He opted to sit for Sussex, and returned his son Samuel in his place for Lewes. He was rewarded for his loyalty to the Whigs by the appointment of his younger son, Peter Goff, as receiver-general of the land tax for Sussex in January 1710. He stood security for Peter with his elder son Samuel. At the 1710 British general election he was returned as MP for Lewes in place of his son Samuel. On 7 December 1711, he voted for the motion of ‘No Peace without Spain’. On 2 April 1712 he petitioned the Lords for an act to settle the estate of Samuel Western.

== Death and legacy ==
Gott died in 1712 aged 58, possibly by suicide having allegedly hanged himself, and was buried on 16 April 1712 at St Saviour's, Southwark. He had five sons, including Samuel and Peter, and four daughters. Samuel inherited Stanmer but had to sell it in 1712 to pay £10,000 to the Treasury for his brother Peter's debts as receiver-general.

Parliament of England
Preceded by Thomas Mun; John Beaumont	Member of Parliament for Hastings; 1690–1695; With: John Beaumont	Succeeded by John Pulteney; Robert Austen
Preceded by John Pulteney; Robert Austen	Member of Parliament for Hastings; 1698– 1701; With: John Pulteney	Succeeded by John Pulteney; John Mounsher
Parliament of Great Britain
Preceded by Thomas Pelham; Richard Payne	Member of Parliament for Lewes; 1708–1708; With: Thomas Pelham	Succeeded by Thomas Pelham; Samuel Gott
Preceded by John Morley Trevor; Sir George Parker, Bt	Member of Parliament for Sussex; 1708–1710; With: Sir Henry Peachey, Bt	Succeeded by Charles Eversfield; Sir George Parker, Bt
Preceded by Thomas Pelham; Samuel Gott	Member of Parliament for Lewes; 1710–1712; With: Thomas Pelham	Succeeded by Thomas Pelham; John Morley Trevor
