= Sir William Ashburnham, 2nd Baronet =

British politician (1678-1755)

Coat of arms of Sir William Ashburnham, 2nd Baronet
Crest Out of a ducal coronet Or an ash tree Proper Escutcheon Gules a fess between six mullets Argent Motto Will God, And I Shall

Sir William Ashburnham, 2nd Baronet (1 April 1678 – 7 November 1755) was a British politician who sat in the House of Commons between 1710 and 1741.

Ashburnham was the eldest surviving son of Sir Denny Ashburnham, 1st Baronet of Broomham and his wife Anne Watkins, daughter of Sir David Watkins. In 1697, he succeeded his father in the baronetcy. He married Margaret Pelham, daughter of Sir Nicholas Pelham on 7 June 1701.

Ashburnham was appointed to a sinecure post as Chamberlain of the Exchequer in 1710 and held the post until his death. At the 1710 general election he was returned unopposed as Member of Parliament for Hastings on the family interest but did not stand in 1713. He was returned as MP for Seaford at the 1715 general election but resigned his seat in 1717 when he was granted another sinecure post as Commissioner of the Alienation Office. He returned to parliament as MP for Hastings at the 1722 general election and held the seat at the elections of 1727 and 1734. In 1735 he was appointed receiver of fines. In 1741 he resigned his seat in parliament through ill health but retained his government posts until his death.

Ashburnham died on 7 November 1755 and was buried at Guestling in Sussex. His marriage was childless and he was succeeded in the baronetcy by his younger brother Charles.

Parliament of Great Britain
Preceded by John Pulteney; John Ashburnham	Member of Parliament for Hastings; 1710–1713; With: Sir Joseph Martin	Succeeded by Archibald Hutcheson; Sir Joseph Martin
Preceded by George Naylor; William Lowndes	Member of Parliament for Seaford; 1715–1717; With: George Naylor	Succeeded by George Naylor; Hon. Henry Pelham
Preceded by Archibald Hutcheson; Henry Pelham	Member of Parliament for Hastings; 1722–1741; With: Archibald Hutchinson 1722–1727; Thomas Townshend 1727–1728; Thomas Pelham 1728–1741	Succeeded by James Pelham; Andrew Stone
Baronetage of England
Preceded by Denny Ashburnham	Baronet (of Bromham); 1697–1755	Succeeded by Charles Ashburnham
