= Andrew Stone (MP) =

Andrew Stone (4 February 1703 – 17 December 1773) was a significant figure in the British royal circle in the 18th century and a Member of Parliament.

== Biography ==
Stone was the eldest son of Andrew Stone, a London goldsmith and one of the founders of Martins Bank, and was educated at Westminster School and Christ Church, Oxford. His brother was George Stone, Primate of All Ireland.

He became private secretary to the Duke of Newcastle in 1732, and was for many years on the most intimate and confidential terms both with the Duke and with his brother Henry Pelham. He was appointed Under-secretary of State in 1734, joint secretary to the Lords Justices in 1744, and was a Commissioner of Trade and Plantations from 1749 to 1761. He was also Secretary of Barbados from 1742, and registrar of Chancery in Jamaica from 1753, both of which offices he held until his death.

Despite being accused on Jacobite sympathies, Stone also gained a position of great personal influence with George II by whom he was made tutor and later secretary to Prince George, afterwards George III. On the accession of the latter to the throne, he was appointed treasurer to Queen Charlotte, and attaching himself to Lord Bute he became an influential member of the party known as The King's Friends, whose meetings were frequently held at his house. He promoted the preferment of his brother George, who went to Ireland as chaplain to the Lionel Sackville, 1st Duke of Dorset.

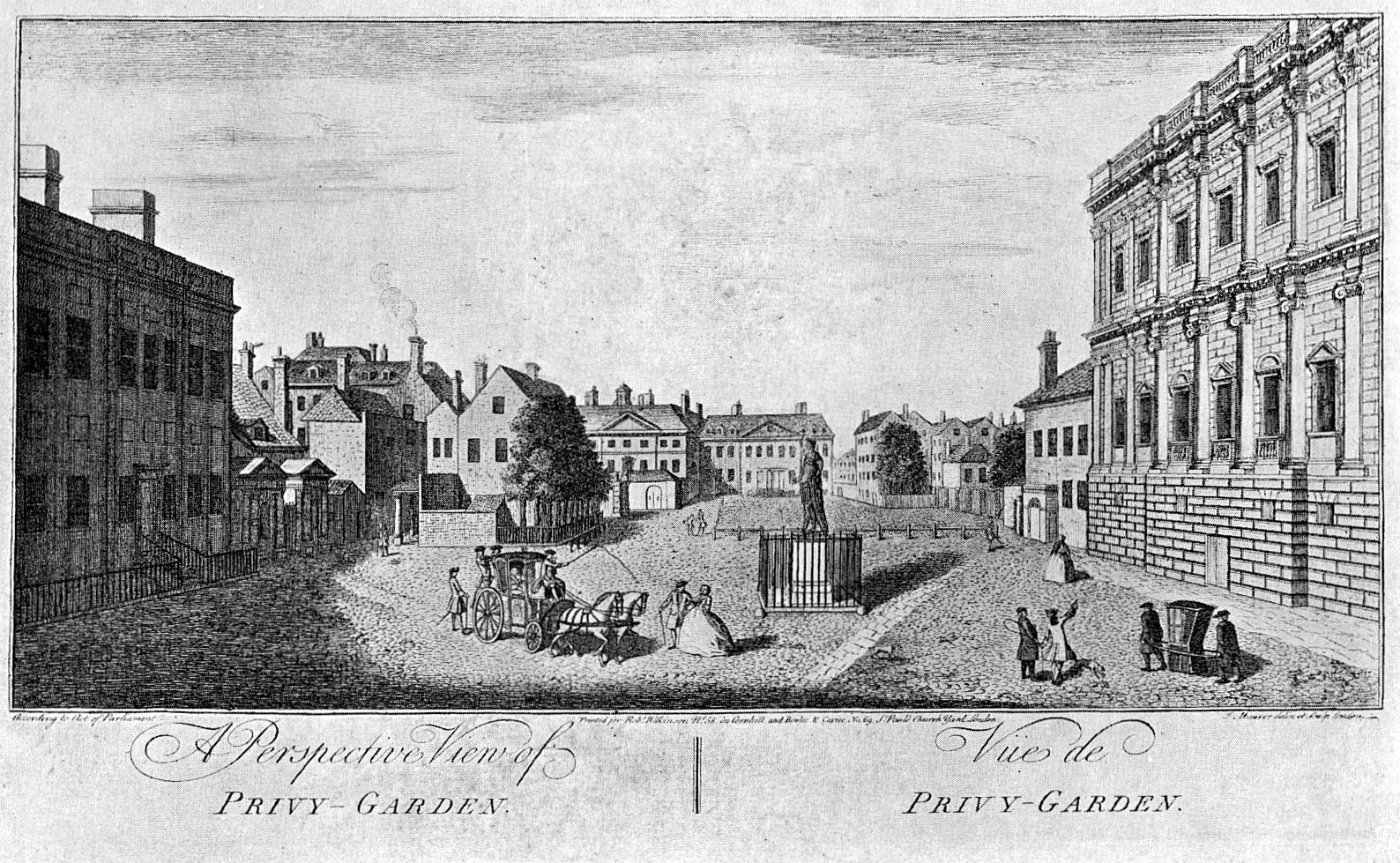
Privy Garden, Whitehall

He was Member of Parliament (MP) for Hastings from 1741 to 1761.

He died in 1773 at his home in Privy Garden, Whitehall, London and was buried in the nave of Westminster Abbey. He had married in 1743, Hannah, the daughter of Stephen Mauvillion of Tooting, and had a son, Thomas, who predeceased him. Both Thomas and his mother were also buried in the nave of the Abbey.

Parliament of Great Britain
Preceded by Sir William Ashburnham; Thomas Pelham	Member of Parliament for Hastings; 1741–1761; With: James Pelham	Succeeded by Hon. James Brudenell; William Ashburnham
Court offices
New office	Treasurer to Queen Charlotte; 1761–1773	Succeeded by The Earl of Guilford
