= James Huxley =

Member of the Parliament of England

James Huxley (1614 – c. 1672) was an English politician who sat in the House of Commons in 1660.

Huxley was the son of George Huxley of Edmonton where he was baptised on 6 November 1614. He was admitted at Gray's Inn in 1633. In 1640 he obtained a mortgage on the estate of Dornford in the parish of Wootton, West Oxfordshire. The owners tried to sell the property to Lucius Cary, 2nd Viscount Falkland, but the sale became a matter of dispute and Cary died. In 1653 Huxley paid off the various parties and acquired Dornford.

Huxley also lived at Oxford in a substantial house next to Pembroke College, Oxford and became a freeman of Oxford on 14 March 1660. In 1660, he was elected Member of Parliament for Oxford in the Convention Parliament.

Huxley married Elizabeth Barkham, daughter of Sir William Barkham. They had daughters Jane who married Sir Nicholas Pelham and Elizabeth who married Robert Cressett of Upton Cressett.
