= Sir William Ashburnham, 4th Baronet =

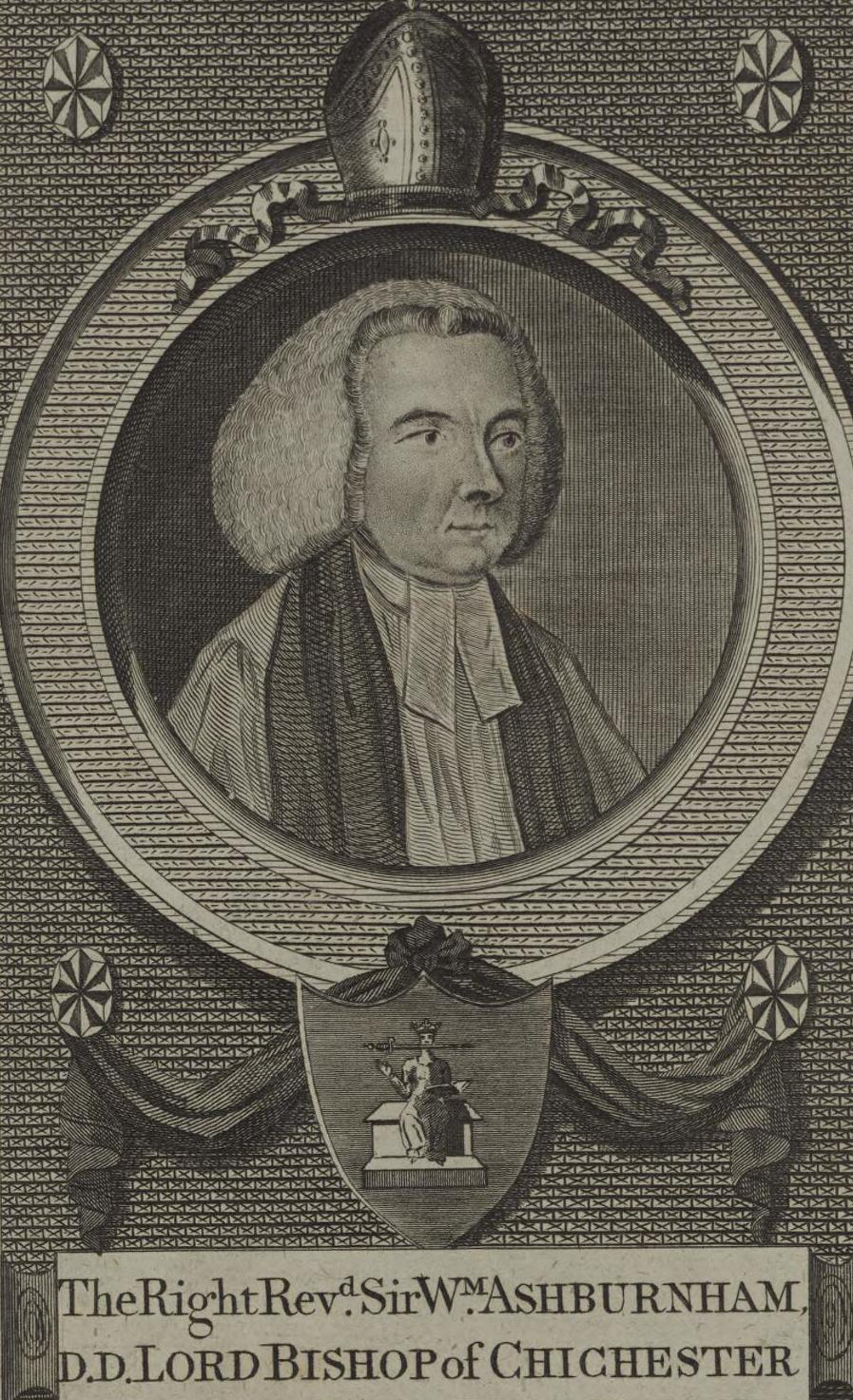
Sir William Ashburnham

Sir William Ashburnham, 4th Baronet (16 January 1710 – 4 September 1797) was a Church of England priest and also a baronet.

== Family ==
William Ashburnham was the son of Sir Charles Ashburnham, the 3rd baronet of Bromham, Guestling, Sussex. William succeeded to the title as 4th Baronet Ashburnham, on 3 October 1762. He married Margaret daughter of Thomas Pelham of Lewes, in Guestling and had a son William who became the M.P. for Hastings.

== Education ==
Ashburnham matriculated in 1728 and then went on to study at Corpus Christi College, Cambridge, where he received a B.A. in 1732–1733.

William Ashburnham was elected a fellow of Corpus Christi in 1733–1735, received his M.A. (Lit. Reg.) in 1739, and granted DD in 1749.

== Career ==
Ashburnham was ordained 1733 and appointed chaplain to the Royal Hospital Chelsea in 1741. The following year, 1742 he became Vicar of St Peter Bexhill, Sussex. He was made Dean of Chichester in 1742 and in 1743 canon residentiary of St Paul's Cathedral (a preferment he kept in commendam with the see). Then from 1754 he was Bishop of Chichester for 43 years till his death in 1797, one of the longest episcopates for the see of Chichester. Ashburnham was also rector of Guestling, 1743–1797.

During 1767, while Bishop of Chichester, Ashburnham was asked by the dean and chapter to reduce the number of professional adult male singers in the choir (known as lay vicars). The establishment had been for eight. Ashburnham issued statutes to reduce the number to four, their wages immediately being increased by dividing amongst them the stipend originally allotted to the whole body.

The current Chichester Cathedral choir has an establishment for six lay vicars.

William Ashburnham died 4 September 1797.

== Arms ==
Coat of arms of Sir William Ashburnham, 4th Baronet
Crest Out of a ducal coronet Or an ash tree Proper Escutcheon Gules a fess between six mullets Argent Motto Will God, And I Shall

== See also ==
- Ashburnham baronets
- Earl of Ashburnham

== Sources ==
- "Chichester Cathedral Website". The Dean and Chapter, Chichester Cathedral.
- Camden, William (1701). Britannia Vol 1 (English ed.). London: Joseph Wild.
- Kimber, E; Johnson, R (1771). The baronetage of England: containing a genealogical and Historical Account of all the English Baronets. London: G. Woodfall, J. Fuller, E. Johnson et al.
- Lower, Mark Anthony (1865). The Worthies of Sussex. Lewes, Sussex: Sussex Advertiser.
- Morris, John, ed. (1976). Domesday Book: Sussex. Chichester: Phillimore. ISBN 0-85033-145-5.
- "National archives". UK Government.
- Stephens, W.R.W. (1876). Memorials of the South Saxon See and Cathedral Church of Chichester. London: Bentley.
- Venn, J; Venn, J. A., eds. (1922–1958). Alumni Cantabrigienses (10 vols). Cambridge University Press.

Baronetage of England
Preceded by Charles Ashburnham	Baronet (of Broomham); 1762–1797	Succeeded by William Ashburnham
Church of England titles
Preceded by James Hargraves	Dean of Chichester; 1741–1754	Succeeded by Thomas Ball
Preceded by Matthias Mawson	Bishop of Chichester; 1754–1797	Succeeded by John Buckner
