= Pelham (name) =

Pelham is an English surname. Notable people with the surname include:

== Surname ==
British aristocratic Whig politicians:

- Thomas Pelham, 1st Baron Pelham (1653–1712), father of two British Prime Ministers:
  - Thomas Pelham-Holles, 1st Duke of Newcastle (1693–1768)
  - Henry Pelham (1694–1754)

American artistic family

- Peter Pelham (c. 1695 – 1751), artist
- Peter Pelham (composer) (1721–1805)
- Henry Pelham (engraver) (1748/49–1806)
- William Pelham (bookseller) (1759–1827)

Other people (in alphabetical order)

- Charles Pelham (American politician) (1835–1908), U.S. Representative from Alabama
- Francis Pelham, 5th Earl of Chichester (1844–1905), British nobleman and amateur cricketer
- Frederick Thomas Pelham (1808–1861), Royal Navy officer and Second Naval Lord
- George F. Pelham (1867–1937), American architect
- Henry Francis Pelham (1846–1907), English scholar and historian
- John Pelham (bishop) (1811–1894), Bishop of Norwich in 1857–1893
- John Pelham (soldier) (1838–1863), Confederate artillery officer during the American Civil War
- Moses Pelham (born 1971), German rapper and musician
- Peregrine Pelham (died 1650), British Member of Parliament
- Richard Pelham (1815–1876), American blackface performer
- Thomas Pelham (disambiguation), various people
- William Pelham (Medal of Honor) (1845/47–1933), American Union Navy sailor, recipient of Medal of Honor

Fictional characters

- Herbert "Bertie" Pelham, Marquess of Hexham, a character on the television drama Downton Abbey and its film adaptation

== First name ==
- Pelham Horton Box (1898–1937), British historian
- Pelham Humfrey (1647–1674), English Baroque composer
- Sir Pelham Warner ("Plum Warner", 1873–1963), English test cricketer
- P. G. von Donop (Pelham George von Donop, 1851–1921), English footballer, soldier and railway inspector, godfather to P. G. Wodehouse
- P. G. Wodehouse (Sir Pelham Grenville Wodehouse, 1881–1975), English author, lyricist, playwright
