= Adam Ashburnham =

Member of the Parliament of England

Adam Ashburnham was an English MP in the 16th century, and represented Winchelsea from 1593 to 1597.

He was the first son of Lawrence Ashburnham of Broomham by Eva, daughter of Richard Adams of Sussex, widow of John Levett of Hollington.

He married Elizabeth, daughter of Roger Twysden of Roydon Hall, East Peckham, Kent, and they had five sons and one daughter. His grandson was Sir Denny Ashburnham, 1st Baronet, Member of Parliament for Hastings from 1660 to 1689.
