= Thomas Pelham (of Stanmer) =

British politician (c.1705–1737)

Thomas Pelham (c. 1705 — 21 December 1737) was a British politician. Trained as a merchant to work in the Ottoman Empire, he succeeded to the family estates on the death of his brother, and was placed in Parliament on the family interest by his first cousin, the Duke of Newcastle. His alcoholism did not endear him to the electors, and he died of it in 1737.

== Biography ==
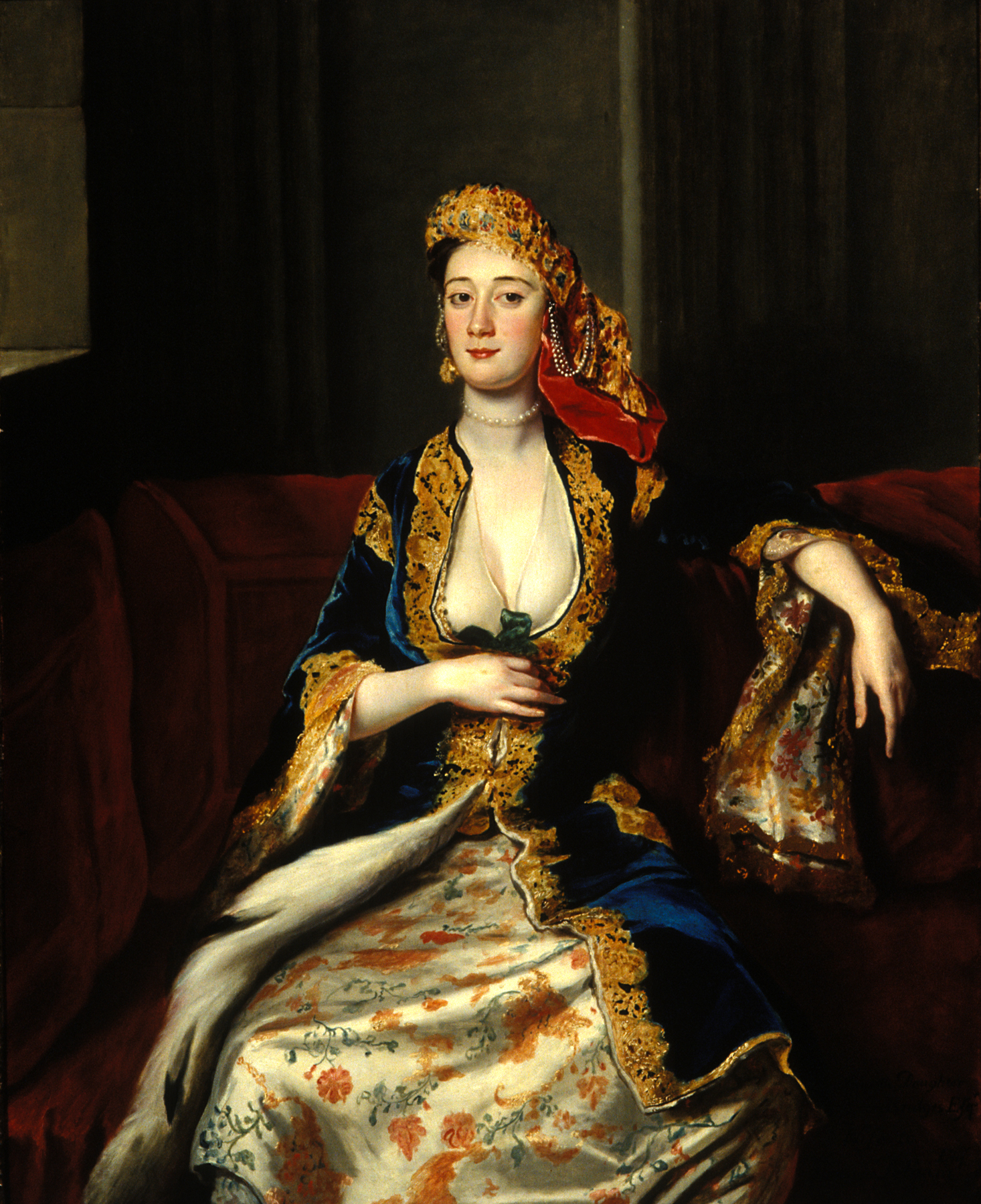
Mrs. Thomas Pelham, painting by John Vanderbank, 1720s.

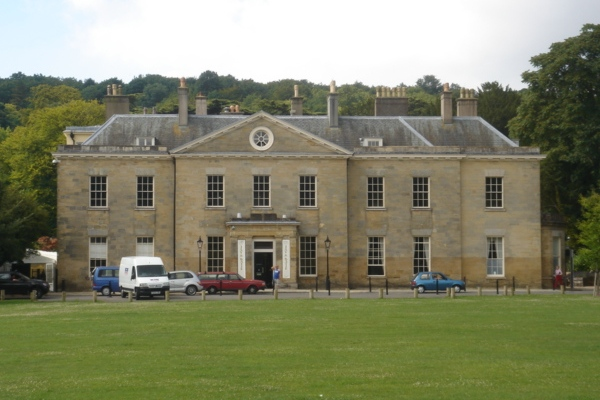
Stanmer House

The third son of Henry Pelham, he was apprenticed at a young age to John Lethieullier, a merchant in Constantinople, Ottoman Empire, from which he got the name of "Turk" Pelham. On 5 February 1725, he married Lethieullier's stepdaughter, Annetta Bridges, by whom he had one son and one daughter:

- Thomas Pelham, 1st Earl of Chichester (1728—1805)
- Henrietta Pelham, married Hon. Richard Temple and then George Nevill, 1st Earl of Abergavenny

Shortly thereafter, in 1725, he succeeded his elder brother Henry to the family estates, including Stanmer House, which was in the process of being rebuilt by the French architect Nicholas Dubois.

While he declined his cousin, the Duke of Newcastle's proposal to nominate him for Lewes immediately upon his brother's death (Thomas was still abroad at the time), he was brought in at the 1727 election by the Newcastle interest.

Newcastle was not satisfied with Thomas, although he was a government supporter, complaining of his drunkenness and "imprudent and extravagant" talk at Lewes when in his cups. He died in 1737 of the effects of alcoholism.

Parliament of Great Britain
Preceded by Thomas Pelham; Sir Nicholas Pelham	Member of Parliament for Lewes; 1727–1737; With: Thomas Pelham	Succeeded by Thomas Pelham; John Morley Trevor
