= William Ashburnham, 2nd Baron Ashburnham =

English politician

William Ashburnham, 2nd Baron Ashburnham (21 May 1679 – 16 June 1710) was an English landowner and Tory politician who sat in the English and British House of Commons from 1702 until 1710. Thereafter, he succeeded to the peerage as Baron Ashburnham and entered the House of Lords.

Ashburnham was the eldest son of John Ashburnham, 1st Baron Ashburnham, and his wife Bridget Vaughan, daughter of Walter Vaughan, of Porthammel House, Brecknockshire.

Ashburnham was put forward by his father for Hastings at the second general election of 1701, but was defeated. However at the 1702 English general election, he returned unopposed as Member of Parliament for Hastings. His only known action in Parliament was to act as teller with regard to the occasional conformity bill. He returned unopposed again for Hastings at the 1705 English general election and voted against the Court candidate for Speaker on 25 October 1705. At the 1708 British general election, he returned unopposed again as a Tory for Hastings. He succeeded his father in the barony on 21 January 1710, and vacated his seat in the House of Commons. He was also briefly Custos Rotulorum of Brecknockshire in 1710.

Ashburnham married Catherine Taylor, daughter of Thomas Taylor, of Clapham, Bedfordshire, in 1705. The marriage was childless. He died on 16 June 1710, aged 31, from smallpox, and was buried at Ashburnham. Lady Ashburnham also died from smallpox less than a month later, aged 23. He was succeeded in the peerage by his younger brother, John.

Parliament of England
Preceded by John Pulteney; John Mounsher	Member of Parliament for Hastings; 1702–1707; With: John Pulteney	Succeeded by Parliament of Great Britain
Parliament of Great Britain
Preceded by Parliament of England	Member of Parliament for Hastings; 1707–1710; With: John Pulteney	Succeeded by John Pulteney; John Ashburnham
Honorary titles
Preceded by The Lord Ashburnham	Custos Rotulorum of Brecknockshire; 1710	Succeeded by The Lord Ashburnham
Peerage of England
Preceded by John Ashburnham	Baron Ashburnham; 1710	Succeeded by John Ashburnham
