= Nicholas Delves =

English politician

Nicholas Delves (2 December 1618 – 3 November 1690) was an English politician who sat in the House of Commons in 1659 and 1660.

Delves was the son of Thomas Delves, a grazier of Hollington, Sussex. In 1635, he was apprenticed to a Merchant Taylor of London and himself became a merchant of London and a member of the Worshipful Company of Merchant Taylors. His brother Thomas Delves was a Baron of Dover and returning officer for the port. In 1659, Delves was elected Member of Parliament for Hastings in the Third Protectorate Parliament.

In 1660, Delves was re-elected MP for Hastings in the Convention Parliament. He was sworn as an Alderman of the City of London for Vintry Ward on 2 April 1661 but was discharged on 13 June 1661 for a fine of £420. He was Master of the Merchant Taylors in 1662 and 1663 and was one of the wardens of Merchant Taylors' School. In 1664 he brought Titus Oates to Merchant Taylors' School as a free Scholar. He was Deputy-Governor of the Irish Society in 1668-9.

Delves died at the age of 71

Parliament of England
Preceded by Not represented in Second Protectorate Parliament	Member of Parliament for Hastings; 1659; With: Samuel Gott	Succeeded by Not represented in restored Rump
