= Henry Pelham (Clerk of the Pells) =

English Member of Parliament

Henry Pelham (c.1661 – 1 April 1721) was an English Member of Parliament. A younger son of Sir John Pelham, 3rd Baronet, he was returned for two Parliamentary constituencies in Sussex, where the family held considerable influence, for most of the time between 1690 and 1702. Appointed to the sinecure office of Clerk of the Pells in 1698, Pelham was a reliable Whig and Court-supporting placeman.

== Education and family ==
Pelham was born in about 1661, the third son of Sir John Pelham, 3rd Baronet. He was educated at Eton from about 1673 to 1678, and matriculated at Christ Church, Oxford on 14 February 1679. He also entered Gray's Inn in 1678. On 18 December 1683, he married Frances Byne, daughter of John Byne, by whom he had three sons and four daughters:

- Henry Pelham (c.1694–1725)
- John Pelham (d. 1721)
- Thomas Pelham (c.1705–1737)
- Elizabeth Pelham, married Thomas Pelham
- Grace Pelham, married William Poole, of Hook
- Frances Pelham, married Sir Francis Poole, 2nd Baronet
- Lucy Pelham, married Talbot Yelverton, 1st Earl of Sussex

== Parliamentary career ==
Henry's father, Sir John, owned considerable property in and around Seaford, and had enough Parliamentary influence in that borough to split the nomination of members with Sir William Thomas, 1st Baronet. Accordingly, he was able to provide Henry with a seat there at the 1690 election, which had briefly been filled by Sir John's half-brother Sir Nicholas Pelham. Henry was classed by Lord Carmarthen as a Whig, but his Parliamentary activity at the time is not easily distinguished from that of his brother Thomas, who sat for Lewes.

The Pelham interest at Lewes was even stronger than that at Seaford. Both Thomas and Henry owned property in the town, and their seats at Halland and Stanmer Park, respectively, were nearby. At the 1695 election, the brothers arranged their return for both seats at Lewes. In the House, Henry regularly supported the Government, signed the Association in February 1696, and voted for the attainder of Sir John Fenwick. In May 1697, Thomas was again named a Lord of the Treasury, and obtained for Henry the office of Clerk of the Pells when it was vacated by the death of William Wardour in January 1697/8. His right to the office, a sinecure worth £2,000 per year, was disputed by Thomas Strangways, who held a reversionary grant to it from Charles II, but the office was ultimately adjudged to be in the gift of the Lord High Treasurer rather than the King, and Pelham retained it until his death.

The brothers were again returned in the 1698 election, after which Henry was classed as a Court supporter and placeman. Thomas pursued a more independent line; his appointment to the Treasury had perhaps been intended to solidify his allegiance to the Court's interests in Parliament, but if so, it was unsuccessful. His association with Lord Sunderland set him at variance with the Whig Junto and the rest of the Treasury board, and his resolute opposition in the Commons to a standing army led to his dismissal from the Treasury on 1 June 1699. Thomas' general political inclinations remained Whiggish, however, and it was perhaps with a view to reconciliation that Henry vacated his seat at the January 1701 English general election to make a place for the Attorney General, Sir Thomas Trevor. Trevor's judicial appointment in June allowed Henry to again take up the Lewes seat at the November 1701 English general election, having meanwhile loaned the town £200. Unlike Thomas, Henry was held to be a reliable Whig, and in January 1702, he acted as teller against hearing the Maidstone election case before the bar of the House. He did not stand at the 1702 election and retired from Parliament.

== Later years ==
The death of Sir John Pelham in January 1703 gave rise to an extended falling-out between Thomas and Henry over the division of their father's estate. The two finally reached a settlement of the property in 1708. Henry was appointed a commissioner for taking subscriptions to the South Sea Company in 1711. He died on 1 April 1721 and was buried in St Anne's Church, Soho.

Parliament of England
Preceded by William Campion; Sir Nicholas Pelham	Member of Parliament for Seaford; 1690–1695; With: William Campion	Succeeded by William Campion; William Lowndes
Preceded by Thomas Pelham; Richard Bridger	Member of Parliament for Lewes; 1695–1700; With: Thomas Pelham	Succeeded by Thomas Pelham; Sir Thomas Trevor
Preceded by Thomas Pelham; Sir Thomas Trevor	Member of Parliament for Lewes; 1701–1702; With: Thomas Pelham	Succeeded by Thomas Pelham; Richard Payne
Honorary titles
Preceded by William Wardour	Clerk of the Pells; 1698–1721	Succeeded by Robert Walpole
