= Guestling =

Village in East Sussex, England

Coordinates: 50.89°N 0.63°E

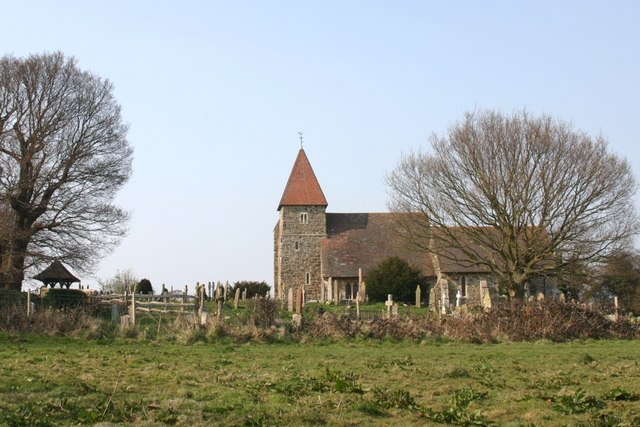
- St Laurence's Church, Guestling

- Location within East Sussex
- Area: 15.9 km^{2} (6.1 sq mi)
- Population: 1,432 (Parish-2011)
  - Density: 207/sq mi (80/km^{2})
- OS grid reference: TQ848132
  - London: 53 miles (85 km) NW
- District: Rother
- Shire county: East Sussex
- Region: South East
- Country: England
- Sovereign state: United Kingdom
- Post town: HASTINGS
- Postcode district: TN35
- Dialling code: 01424
- Police: Sussex
- Fire: East Sussex
- Ambulance: South East Coast
- UK Parliament: Hastings and Rye

Guestling is a village and civil parish in the Rother district of East Sussex, England. The village is located 3 miles (4.8 km) north-east of Hastings on the A259 road to Rye. Its parish church is dedicated to St Laurence.

== History ==
Guestling, referred to in the Domesday Book (1086) as Gestelinges, was originally named as a settlement of the family of a man named Gyrstel. The Domesday entry records that the village consisted in 1086 of 21 households, 14 villagers and 7 cottagers.

In 1542, Gregory Martin was born in Guestling and went on to do the majority of the translation for the Douay–Rheims Bible, the first full official Catholic English Bible translation. In 1896, hand made bricks were first produced in Guestling, which would go on to be used in Royal locations such as Buckingham Palace and Hampton Court.

In June 2017, Brian Bellhouse was trampled to death by a herd of cows in a field at Church Lane, Guestling.

== Geography ==
The village of Guestling is located 2 miles (3.2 km) from the coast, and about 3.25 miles (5.23 km) north east of Hastings The village is a scattered one, consisting of multiple parts, including Guestling Green and Guestling Thorn. The hamlet of Three Oaks also lies within the parish.

== Landmarks and culture ==
The village was probably originally centred around the St Laurence's Church, built in the 11th century: the building has a Norman tower which has been Grade I listed since 1961. However, the villagers moved further away from the church, possibly owing to victims of the Black Death being buried in the churchyard. Also buried in the graveyard was Olive "Nou" Rand Brockwell, nanny of Christopher Robin Milne. The church was restored in 1886, but was further damaged by a fire in 1890. The village's war memorials are located within the church, with 24 names from the First World War and 8 from the Second World War. There has been an annual Flower Festival since the 1990s at St Laurence's Church.

The school in the village is the Guestling-Bradshaw CE Primary School, which dates back to 1835.
