= Isted (disambiguation) =

Isted or Idstedt is a village in Schleswig-Holstein, Germany.

Isted may also refer to:

- Battle of Isted (1850), part of the First Schleswig War

== People with the surname ==
- John Isted, 19th century English cricketer
- John Isted (MP) (fl. 1523–1557), English politician and MP for Hastings
