= Bannok =

Bannok is a surname. Notable people with the surname include:

- Richard Bannok, English MP for Hastings (UK Parliament constituency)
- Robert Bannok, English MP for Hythe, Kent
