= Thomas Lake (disambiguation) =

Thomas Lake (1567–1630) was an English politician.

Thomas Lake may also refer to:

== People ==
- Thomas Lake (died 1606), English politician
- Thomas Lake (died 1653), English MP for Wells

== Lakes ==
- Thomas Lake (Annapolis)
- Thomas Lake (Halifax)
- Thomas Lake, a lake in Le Sueur County, Minnesota
- Thomas Lake (Portage County, Wisconsin)

== See also ==
- Lake Thomas
