= John Harry =

John Harry may refer to:

- Jack Harry (1857–1919), Australian cricketer
- John Harry (MP) (fl. 1410), MP for Hastings
- John ap Harry, MP for Herefordshire (UK Parliament constituency) in 1406, 1407 and 1410

== See also ==
- John Harrys
- John Harris (disambiguation)
