= 1869 Hastings by-election =

UK parliamentary by-election

The 1869 Hastings by-election was fought on 18 November 1869. The by-election was fought due to the death of the incumbent MP of the Liberal Party, Frederick North. It was won by the Liberal candidate Ughtred James Kay-Shuttleworth.
