= John Durrant =

John Durrant may refer to:

- John Hartley Durrant, entomologist
- John Durrant (MP) for Hastings

== See also ==
- Jack Durrant, footballer
