= John Salerne (died 1415) =

English politician

Do not confuse with John Salerne (died 1410)

John Salerne (died 1415) of Rye and Leigh in Iden, Sussex, was an English politician.

He was a member (MP) of the parliament of England for Rye in 1372, 1373 and 1391, and for Hastings in 1378, May 1382, February 1383 and October 1383.
