= Musgrave Brisco =

British politician

Musgrave Brisco (1791 – 9 May 1854) was a British Conservative Party politician.

A former mayor of Hastings. In the 1830s, he assisted his brother, Wastel Brisco, with the development of Bohemia House in Summerfields, St Leonards-on-Sea, and was appointed High Sheriff of Sussex for 1843. He was then elected as a Member of Parliament (MP) for Hastings at a by-election in 1844, and held the seat until he resigned from Parliament through appointment as Steward of the Chiltern Hundreds on 5 May 1854.

Parliament of the United Kingdom
Preceded by Joseph Planta; Robert Hollond	Member of Parliament for Hastings; 1844–1854; With: Robert Hollond 1844–1852; Patrick Robertson 1852–1854	Succeeded by Frederick North; Patrick Robertson
Honorary titles
Preceded by George Wyndham	High Sheriff of Sussex; 1843	Succeeded by Edward Hussey
