= George Waldegrave-Leslie =

The Hon. George Waldgrave (later Waldegrave-Leslie), 3rd Viscount Chewton, FRSE, DL (1825–1904), was a British Liberal Party politician.

== Life ==
He was born on 30 September 1825, the youngest son of the 8th Earl Waldegrave, and his wife Elizabeth Whitbread. His older brother was Samuel Waldegrave who became Bishop of Carlisle.

During the invasion scare of 1859 he raised the 1st Cinque Ports Rifle Volunteers out of the Hastings Rifle Club, which in all but name was the successor of the old Cinque Ports Volunteers of about 1789. Lady Waldegrave allowed them to set up a rifle range shooting across Ecclesbourne Glen, which they used for many years. Most of the volunteers provided their own rifles and the corps funded its own uniforms. By the middle of 1859 it had reached 70 members, and was officially adopted on 17 December 1859.

He became a barrister and was MP for Hastings from 1864–68. On 22 January 1861, he had married Henrietta Leslie, 17th Countess of Rothes, adopted the name Waldegrave-Leslie and differenced the Leslie Arms with a canton ermine and a red rose on the crest (for his use only).

He died on 8 July 1904.

== Sources ==
- Leigh Rayment's Historical List of MPs
- Ray Westlake, Tracing the Rifle Volunteers, Barnsley: Pen and Sword, 2010, ISBN 978-1-84884-211-3.

Parliament of the United Kingdom
Preceded by Lord Harry Vane; Frederick North	Member of Parliament for Hastings; 1864–1868; With: Frederick North	Succeeded by Frederick North; Patrick Robertson
