= John Taylor (by 1493 – 1547 or later) =

English politician

John Taylor (by 1493 – 1547 or later), of Hastings, Sussex, was an English politician.

He was a member (MP) of the parliament of England for Hastings in 1529 and 1536.
