= John Bexle =

English politician

John Bexle was an English politician. He sat as MP for Hastings in 1406.

He was perhaps the son of the portsman William Bexle, who had held land at Wilting near Hastings in the 1370s. John had claimed exemption from taxation during the early years of Henry IV's reign in the same place where William held land. He had also once been a tenant on the manor of Knelle.
