= Hastings (constituency) =

Parliamentary constituency, 1885–1983

- Former borough constituency for the House of Commons

1366–1983
- Seats: one
- Replaced by: Hastings and Rye

Hastings was a parliamentary constituency in Sussex. It returned two Members of Parliament to the Parliament of England until 1707, Parliament of Great Britain before 1801 and the House of Commons of the Parliament of the United Kingdom until the 1885 general election, when its representation was reduced to one member. It was abolished for the 1983 general election, when it was partially replaced by the new Hastings and Rye constituency.

== Boundaries ==
1918–1950: The County Borough of Hastings.

1950–1955: The County Borough of Hastings, the Municipal Borough of Rye, and the Rural District of Battle (except the parishes of Burwash, Etchingham and Ticehurst).

1955–1983: The County Borough of Hastings.

== Members of Parliament ==
=== MPs 1366–1640 ===
Parliament	First member	Second member
1386	John Clyvessend	Edward Martham
1378	John Salerne	
1382 (May)	John Salerne	
1383 (Feb)	John Salerne	
1383 (Oct)	John Salerne	
1388 (Feb)	John Clyvessend	Edward Martham
1388 (Sep)	Richard Bannok	John Scott
1390 (Jan)	John Clyvessend	Richard Wybard
1390 (Nov)		
1391	John Clyvessend	Richard Bannok
1393	John Scott	John Sharp
1394		
1395	Edward Martham	John Hokere
1397 (Jan)	John Clyvessend	John Hokere
1397 (Sep)		
1399	Edward Martham	Henry Mordant
1401		
1402	John Sharp	Robert Burgrove
1404 (Jan)		
1404 (Oct)		
1406	Henry Mordant	John Bexle
1407	Robert Burgrove	Thomas Wybard
1410	Edward Martham	John Harry
1411		
1413 (Feb)		
1413 (May)	Henry Mordant	Richard Huntingdon
1414 (Apr)		
1414 (Nov)	Jihn Sharp	Thomas Julyan
1415		
1416 (Mar)		
1416 (Oct)		
1417	John Lyvett	Richard Huntingdon
1419	Simon Lymbergh	John Martham
1420	Simon Lymbergh	William Courthope
1421 (May)	John Parker	William Courthope
1421 (Dec)	Richard Huntingdon	William Courthope
1510	No names known	
1512	Robert Hall	Henry Benever
1515	?	
1523	Edmund Jacklin alias Bocher	Edmund Franke
1529	Richard Calveley	Thomas Shoyswell
by 1534	John Durrant	John Taylor
1536	?John Durrant	?John Taylor
1539	?	
1542	John Franke	Richard Bishop
1545	?	
1547	Sir William Stafford	John Isted
1553 (Mar)	John Isted	?
1553 (Oct)	Thomas Rhodes	John Peyton
1554 (Apr)	John Franke	John Isted
1554 (Nov)	Thomas Rhodes	John Peyton
1555	Thomas Rhodes	Roger Manwood
1558	Thomas Brett	Henry Tennant
1559	John Franke	James Hobson
1562/3	Sir William Damsell	Richard Lyffe
1571	Richard Lyffe	James Bryan
1572	Richard Lyffe	Thomas Lake
1584	Thomas Lake	Thomas Phillips
1586	Thomas Lake	Thomas Phillips
1588/9	Richard Lyffe	John Parker
1593	Richard Lyffe	Henry Apsley
1597	Richard Lyffe	Edmund Pelham
1601	Sir Thomas Shirley	Richard Lyffe
1604–1611	Richard Lyffe died and replaced by James Lasher	Sir George Carew ennobled and replaced 1605 by Sir Edward Hales
1614	Sir Edward Hales	James Lasher
1621	Samuel Moore	James Lasher
1624	Nicholas Eversfield	Samuel Moore
1625	Nicholas Eversfield	Sackville Crowe
1626	Sir Dudley Carleton replaced by Sir Thomas Parker	Nicholas Eversfield
1628	John Ashburnham	Nicholas Eversfield

=== MPs 1640–1885 ===
Election	1st Member	1st Party	2nd Member	2nd Party
April 1640	Sir John Baker		Robert Reed	
November 1640	John Ashburnham	Royalist	(Sir) Thomas Eversfield	Royalist
February 1644	Ashburnham and Eversfield disabled from sitting – both seats vacant			
1645	John Pelham		Roger Gratwick	
December 1648	Pelham excluded in Pride's Purge – seat vacant		Roger Gratwick	
1653	Hastings was unrepresented in the Barebones Parliament and the First and Second Parliaments of the Protectorate			
January 1659	Samuel Gott		Nicholas Delves	
May 1659	Not represented in the restored Rump			
April 1660	Sir Denny Ashburnham		Nicholas Delves	
1661	Sir Denny Ashburnham		Edmund Waller	
1679	Sir Robert Parker		John Ashburnham	
1681	Sir Robert Parker		Thomas Mun	
1685	Sir Denny Ashburnham		John Ashburnham	
Jan 1689	Thomas Mun		John Ashburnham	
Aug 1689	Thomas Mun		John Beaumont	
1690	Peter Gott		John Beaumont	
1695	John Pulteney		Robert Austen	
1698	John Pulteney		Peter Gott	
1701	John Pulteney		John Mounsher	
1702	John Pulteney		Hon. William Ashburnham	
Feb 1710	John Pulteney		John Ashburnham	Tory
Oct 1710	Sir William Ashburnham		Sir Joseph Martin	
1713	Archibald Hutcheson		Sir Joseph Martin	
1715	Archibald Hutcheson		Henry Pelham	
1722	Archibald Hutcheson		Sir William Ashburnham	
1727	Thomas Townshend		Sir William Ashburnham	
1728	Thomas Pelham		Sir William Ashburnham	
1741	James Pelham		Andrew Stone	Whig
1761	Hon. James Brudenell		William Ashburnham	
1768	Samuel Martin		William Ashburnham	
1774	Henry Temple		Charles Jenkinson	
1780	Henry Temple		John Ord	
1784	John Dawes		John Stanley	Tory
1790	Sir Richard Pepper Arden	Tory	John Stanley	Tory
1794	Robert Dundas	Tory	John Stanley	Tory
1796	Sir James Sanderson	Tory	Nicholas Vansittart	Tory
1798	William Sturges	Tory	Nicholas Vansittart	Tory
1802	Sylvester Douglas	Tory	George Gunning	Tory
1806	Sir John Nicholl		Sir William Fowle Middleton	Tory
1807	George Canning	Tory	Sir Abraham Hume	Tory
1812	James Dawkins	Tory	Sir Abraham Hume	Tory
1818	James Dawkins	Tory	George Peter Holford	Tory
1820	James Dawkins	Tory	William Scott	Tory
June 1826	Sir William Curtis, Bt.	Tory	Sir Charles Wetherell	Tory
December 1826	Evelyn Denison	Whig	James Lushington	Tory
1827	Evelyn Denison	Whig	Joseph Planta	Tory
1830	Sir Henry Fane	Tory	Joseph Planta	Tory
1831	John Ashley Warre	Whig	Frederick North	Whig
1835	Howard Elphinstone	Radical	Frederick North	Whig
1837	Joseph Planta	Conservative	Robert Hollond	Radical
1844	Musgrave Brisco	Conservative	Robert Hollond	Radical
1852	Musgrave Brisco	Conservative	Patrick Robertson	Conservative
1854	Frederick North	Whig	Patrick Robertson	Conservative
1859	Frederick North	Liberal	Lord Harry Vane	Liberal
1864	Frederick North	Liberal	Hon. George Waldegrave-Leslie	Liberal
1865	Patrick Robertson	Conservative	Hon. George Waldegrave-Leslie	Liberal
1868	Thomas Brassey	Liberal	Frederick North	Liberal
1869	Thomas Brassey	Liberal	Ughtred Kay-Shuttleworth	Liberal
1880	Thomas Brassey	Liberal	Charles James Murray	Conservative
1883	Thomas Brassey	Liberal	Henry Bret Ince	Liberal
1885	Redistribution of Seats Act: representation reduced to one member			

=== MPs 1885–1983 ===
Election	Member	Party
1885	Thomas Brassey	Liberal
1886	Wilson Noble	Conservative
1895	William Lucas-Shadwell	Conservative
1900	Freeman Freeman-Thomas	Liberal
1906	Harvey du Cros	Conservative
1908 by-election	Sir Arthur du Cros	Conservative
1918	Laurance Lyon	Coalition Conservative
1921 by-election	Lord Eustace Percy	Coalition Conservative
1937 by-election	Maurice Hely-Hutchinson	Conservative
1945	Sir Neill Cooper-Key	Conservative
1970	Kenneth Warren	Conservative
1983	constituency abolished: see Hastings and Rye	

== Elections ==
=== Elections in the 1830s ===
General election 1830: Hastings
Party	Candidate	Votes	%
Tory	Henry Fane	17	4.1
Tory	Joseph Planta	17	4.1
Whig	John Ashley Warre	174	41.5
Whig	Robert Otway-Cave	157	37.5
Whig	William Taddy	54	12.9
Majority		−157	−37.5
Turnout		c. 210	c. 840.0
Registered electors		c. 25	
Tory hold			
Tory hold			

The votes for Warre, Cave and Taddy were rejected by the mayor.

General election 1831: Hastings
Party	Candidate	Votes	%
Whig	John Ashley Warre	Unopposed	
Whig	Frederick North	Unopposed	
Registered electors		c. 25	
Whig gain from Tory			
Whig gain from Tory			

General election 1832: Hastings
Party	Candidate	Votes	%
Whig	Frederick North	356	44.1
Whig	John Ashley Warre	239	29.6
Radical	Howard Elphinstone	212	26.3
Majority		27	3.3
Turnout		472	82.2
Registered electors		574	
Whig hold			
Whig hold			

General election 1835: Hastings
Party	Candidate	Votes	%	±%
Whig	Frederick North	374	38.1	−35.6
Radical	Howard Elphinstone	291	29.7	+3.4
Conservative	Joseph Planta	159	16.2	New
Conservative	Musgrave Brisco	157	16.0	New
Turnout		558	82.9	+0.7
Registered electors		673		
Majority		83	8.4	+5.1
Whig hold		Swing	−19.5	
Majority		132	13.5	N/A
Radical gain from Whig		Swing	+19.5	

General election 1837: Hastings
Party	Candidate	Votes	%	±%
Conservative	Joseph Planta	401	36.6	+20.4
Radical	Robert Hollond	382	34.9	+5.2
Conservative	Musgrave Brisco	312	28.5	+12.5
Turnout		776	84.0	+1.1
Registered electors		924		
Majority		19	1.7	N/A
Conservative gain from Whig		Swing	+8.9	
Majority		70	6.4	−7.1
Radical hold		Swing	−5.6	

=== Elections in the 1840s ===
General election 1841: Hastings
Party	Candidate	Votes	%	±%
Radical	Robert Hollond	Unopposed		
Conservative	Joseph Planta	Unopposed		
Registered electors		952		
Radical hold				
Conservative hold				

Planta resigned by accepting the office of Steward of the Chiltern Hundreds, causing a by-election.

By-election, 30 March 1844: Hastings
Party	Candidate	Votes	%	±%
Conservative	Musgrave Brisco	513	74.7	N/A
Radical	Robert Ross Rowan Moore	174	25.3	N/A
Majority		339	49.4	N/A
Turnout		687	79.9	N/A
Registered electors		860		
Conservative hold		Swing	N/A	

General election 1847: Hastings
Party	Candidate	Votes	%	±%
Radical	Robert Hollond	423	27.0	N/A
Conservative	Musgrave Brisco	407	26.0	N/A
Whig	John Ashley Warre	387	24.7	N/A
Conservative	Patrick Robertson	348	22.2	N/A
Independent Liberal	William Downing Bruce	0	0.0	New
Turnout		783 (est)	86.1 (est)	N/A
Registered electors		909		
Majority		16	1.0	N/A
Radical hold		Swing	N/A	
Majority		20	1.3	N/A
Conservative hold		Swing	N/A	

=== Elections in the 1850s ===
General election 1852: Hastings
Party	Candidate	Votes	%	±%
Conservative	Patrick Robertson	501	27.1	+4.9
Conservative	Musgrave Brisco	487	26.3	+0.3
Whig	John Ashley Warre	477	25.8	+1.1
Radical	John Locke	386	20.9	−6.1
Majority		10	0.5	−0.8
Turnout		926 (est)	84.9 (est)	−1.2
Registered electors		1,090		
Conservative hold		Swing	+4.0	
Conservative gain from Radical		Swing	+1.7	

Brisco resigned by accepting the office of Steward of the Chiltern Hundreds, causing a by-election.

By-election, 10 May 1854: Hastings
Party	Candidate	Votes	%	±%
Whig	Frederick North	Unopposed		
Whig gain from Conservative				

General election 1857: Hastings
Party	Candidate	Votes	%	±%
Whig	Frederick North	Unopposed		
Conservative	Patrick Robertson	Unopposed		
Registered electors		1,199		
Whig gain from Conservative				
Conservative hold				

General election 1859: Hastings
Party	Candidate	Votes	%	±%
Liberal	Frederick North	613	33.5	N/A
Liberal	Harry Vane	557	30.5	N/A
Conservative	Patrick Robertson	429	23.5	N/A
Conservative	William Drew Lucas-Shadwell	230	12.6	N/A
Majority		128	7.0	N/A
Turnout		915 (est)	74.0 (est)	N/A
Registered electors		1,235		
Liberal hold		Swing	N/A	
Liberal gain from Conservative		Swing	N/A	

=== Elections in the 1860s ===
Powlett succeeded to the peerage, becoming Duke of Cleveland, and causing a by-election.

By-election, 6 October 1864: Hastings
Party	Candidate	Votes	%	±%
Liberal	George Waldegrave-Leslie	645	51.1	−12.9
Conservative	Patrick Robertson	616	48.9	+12.8
Majority		29	2.2	−4.8
Turnout		1,261	78.2	+4.2
Registered electors		1,613		
Liberal hold		Swing	−12.9	

General election 1865: Hastings
Party	Candidate	Votes	%	±%
Liberal	George Waldegrave-Leslie	746	26.6	−3.9
Conservative	Patrick Robertson	737	26.3	+2.8
Liberal	Frederick North	728	26.0	−7.5
Conservative	John Eldon Gorst	591	21.1	+8.5
Turnout		1,401 (est)	74.9 (est)	+0.9
Registered electors		1,871		
Majority		9	0.3	−6.7
Liberal hold		Swing	−4.8	
Majority		9	0.3	N/A
Conservative gain from Liberal		Swing	+4.3	

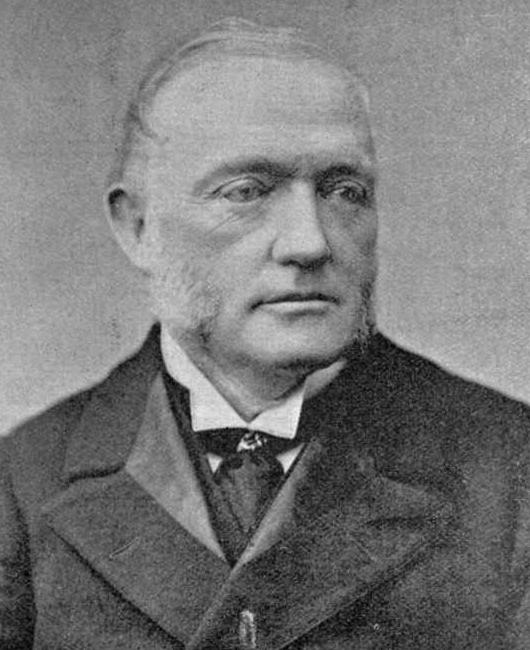
Brassey

General election 1868: Hastings
Party	Candidate	Votes	%	±%
Liberal	Thomas Brassey	1,508	31.5	+4.9
Liberal	Frederick North	1,446	30.2	+4.2
Conservative	Somerset Gough-Calthorpe	967	20.2	−6.1
Conservative	Clement Arthur Thurston	873	18.2	−2.9
Majority		479	10.0	+9.7
Turnout		2,397 (est)	85.6 (est)	+10.7
Registered electors		2,801		
Liberal hold		Swing	+3.9	
Liberal gain from Conservative		Swing	+5.2	

North's death caused a by-election.

By-election, 18 November 1869: Hastings
Party	Candidate	Votes	%	±%
Liberal	Ughtred Kay-Shuttleworth	1,218	52.9	−8.8
Conservative	Patrick Robertson	1,084	47.1	+8.7
Majority		134	5.8	−4.2
Turnout		2,302	82.2	−3.4
Registered electors		2,801		
Liberal hold		Swing	−8.8	

=== Elections in the 1870s ===
General election 1874: Hastings
Party	Candidate	Votes	%	±%
Liberal	Thomas Brassey	1,721	31.8	+0.3
Liberal	Ughtred Kay-Shuttleworth	1,495	27.7	−2.5
Conservative	Patrick Robertson	1,244	23.0	+2.8
Conservative	Richard Nicholson	945	17.5	−0.7
Majority		251	4.7	−5.3
Turnout		2,703 (est)	87.7 (est)	+2.1
Registered electors		3,082		
Liberal hold		Swing	+0.5	
Liberal hold		Swing	−2.7	

=== Elections in the 1880s ===
General election 1880: Hastings
Party	Candidate	Votes	%	±%
Conservative	Charles James Murray	1,873	34.6	−5.9
Liberal	Thomas Brassey	1,838	34.0	+2.2
Liberal	Ughtred Kay-Shuttleworth	1,702	31.4	+3.7
Majority		35	0.6	N/A
Turnout		3,711 (est)	95.0 (est)	+7.3
Registered electors		3,905		
Conservative gain from Liberal		Swing	−3.3	
Liberal hold		Swing	+2.6	

Brassey was appointed a Civil Lord of the Admiralty, requiring a by-election.

By-election, 10 May 1880: Hastings
Party	Candidate	Votes	%	±%
Liberal	Thomas Brassey	Unopposed		
Liberal hold				

Murray resigned, causing a by-election.

By-election, 2 July 1883: Hastings
Party	Candidate	Votes	%	±%
Liberal	Henry Bret Ince	2,138	50.4	−15.0
Conservative	John Henry Boyer Warner	2,101	49.6	+15.0
Majority		37	0.8	N/A
Turnout		4,239	89.4	−5.6 (est)
Registered electors		4,743		
Liberal gain from Conservative		Swing		

General election 1885: Hastings
Party	Candidate	Votes	%	±%
Liberal	Thomas Brassey	2,712	51.5	−13.9
Conservative	Wilson Noble	2,550	48.5	+13.9
Majority		162	3.0	N/A
Turnout		5,262	92.8	−2.2 (est)
Registered electors		5,672		
Liberal hold		Swing	−13.9	

General election 1886: Hastings
Party	Candidate	Votes	%	±%
Conservative	Wilson Noble	2,765	55.4	+6.9
Liberal	Thomas Seymour Brand	2,230	44.6	−6.9
Majority		535	10.8	N/A
Turnout		4,995	88.1	−4.7
Registered electors		5,672		
Conservative gain from Liberal		Swing	+6.9	

=== Elections in the 1890s ===
Hemphill

General election 1892: Hastings
Party	Candidate	Votes	%	±%
Conservative	Wilson Noble	3,077	53.9	−1.5
Liberal	Charles Hemphill	2,628	46.1	+1.5
Majority		449	7.8	−3.0
Turnout		5,705	86.8	−1.3
Registered electors		6,576		
Conservative hold		Swing	+1.5	

Lucas-Shadwell

General election 1895: Hastings
Party	Candidate	Votes	%	±%
Conservative	William Lucas-Shadwell	3,205	52.8	−1.1
Liberal	Cecil Henry Blundell Ince	2,863	47.2	+1.1
Majority		342	5.6	−2.2
Turnout		6,068	83.2	−3.6
Registered electors		7,292		
Conservative hold		Swing	-1.1	

=== Elections in the 1900s ===
Thomas

General election 1900: Hastings
Party	Candidate	Votes	%	±%
Liberal	Freeman Freeman-Thomas	3,399	51.6	+4.4
Conservative	Edward Boyle	3,191	48.4	−4.4
Majority		208	3.2	N/A
Turnout		6,590	80.9	−2.3
Registered electors		8,142		
Liberal gain from Conservative		Swing	+4.4	

General election 1906: Hastings
Party	Candidate	Votes	%	±%
Conservative	Harvey du Cros	4,348	52.5	+4.1
Liberal	Freeman Freeman-Thomas	3,935	47.5	−4.1
Majority		413	5.0	N/A
Turnout		8,283	94.6	+13.7
Registered electors		8,758		
Conservative gain from Liberal		Swing	+4.1	

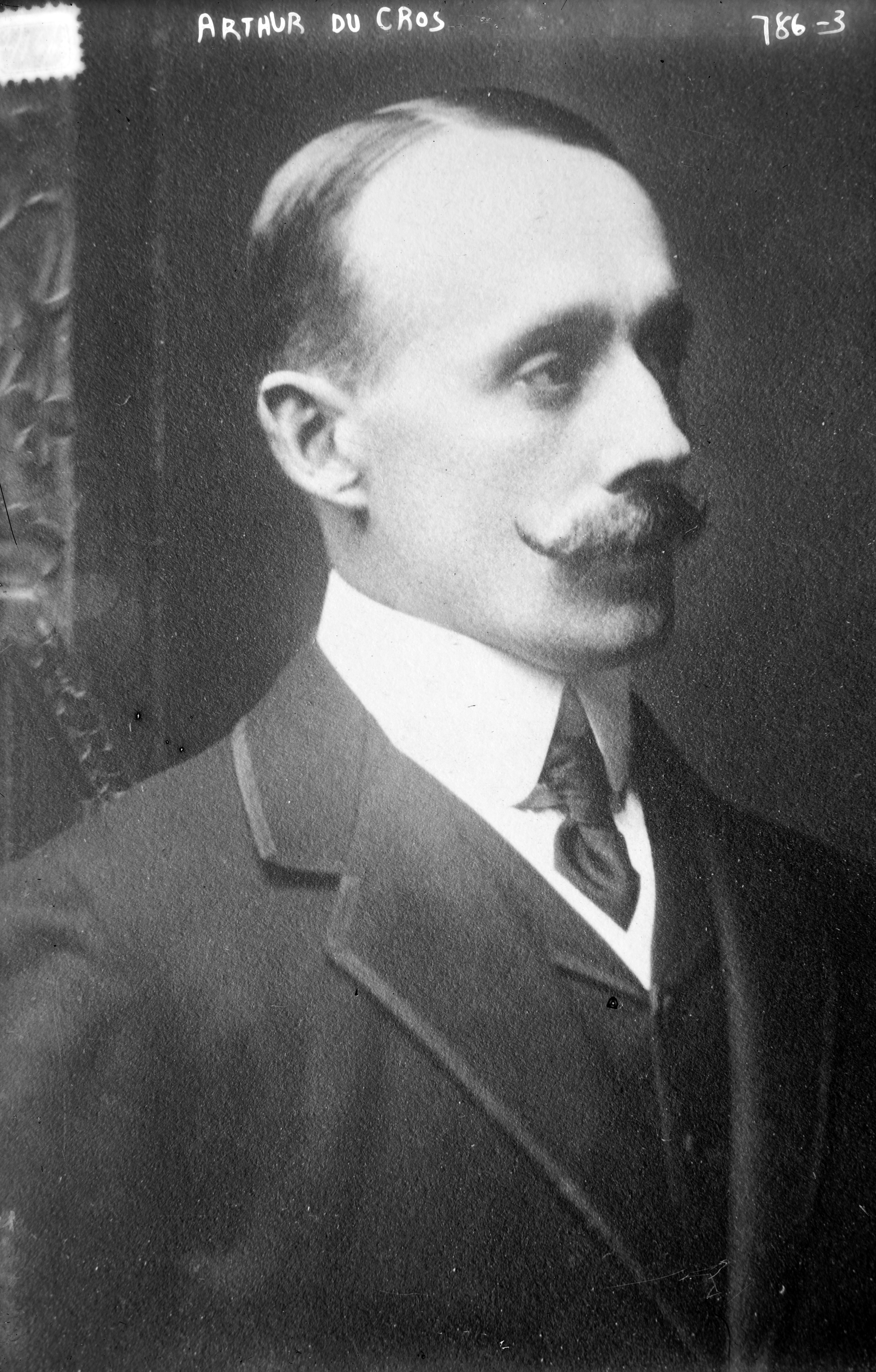
Du Cros

1908 Hastings by-election
Party	Candidate	Votes	%	±%
Conservative	Arthur Du Cros	4,495	56.4	+3.9
Liberal	Robert Harcourt	3,477	43.6	−3.9
Majority		1,018	12.8	+7.8
Turnout		7,972	91.6	−3.0
Registered electors		8,707		
Conservative hold		Swing	+3.9	

=== Elections in the 1910s ===
General election January 1910: Hastings
Party	Candidate	Votes	%	±%
Conservative	Arthur Du Cros	4,634	54.7	+1.7
Liberal	Robert Tweedy-Smith	3,833	45.3	−1.7
Majority		801	9.4	−3.4
Turnout		8,467	93.8	+2.2
Conservative hold		Swing	-1.7	

General election December 1910: Hastings
Party	Candidate	Votes	%	±%
Conservative	Arthur Du Cros	4,397	55.6	+0.9
Liberal	Arthur Frederick William Johnson	3,515	44.4	−0.9
Majority		882	11.2	+1.8
Turnout		7,912	87.6	−6.2
Conservative hold		Swing		

General Election 1914/15

Another General Election was required to take place before the end of 1915. The political parties had been making preparations for an election to take place and by the July 1914, the following candidates had been selected;

- Unionist: Arthur Du Cros
- Liberal: Cecil Patrick Black

General election 1918: Hastings
Party		Candidate	Votes	%	±%
C	Unionist	Laurance Lyon	11,210	75.9	+20.3
	Labour	Joseph George Butler	3,556	24.1	New
Majority			7,654	51.8	+40.6
Turnout			14,766	59.2	−28.4
Registered electors			24,958		
	Unionist hold		Swing		
C indicates candidate endorsed by the coalition government.

=== Elections in the 1920s ===
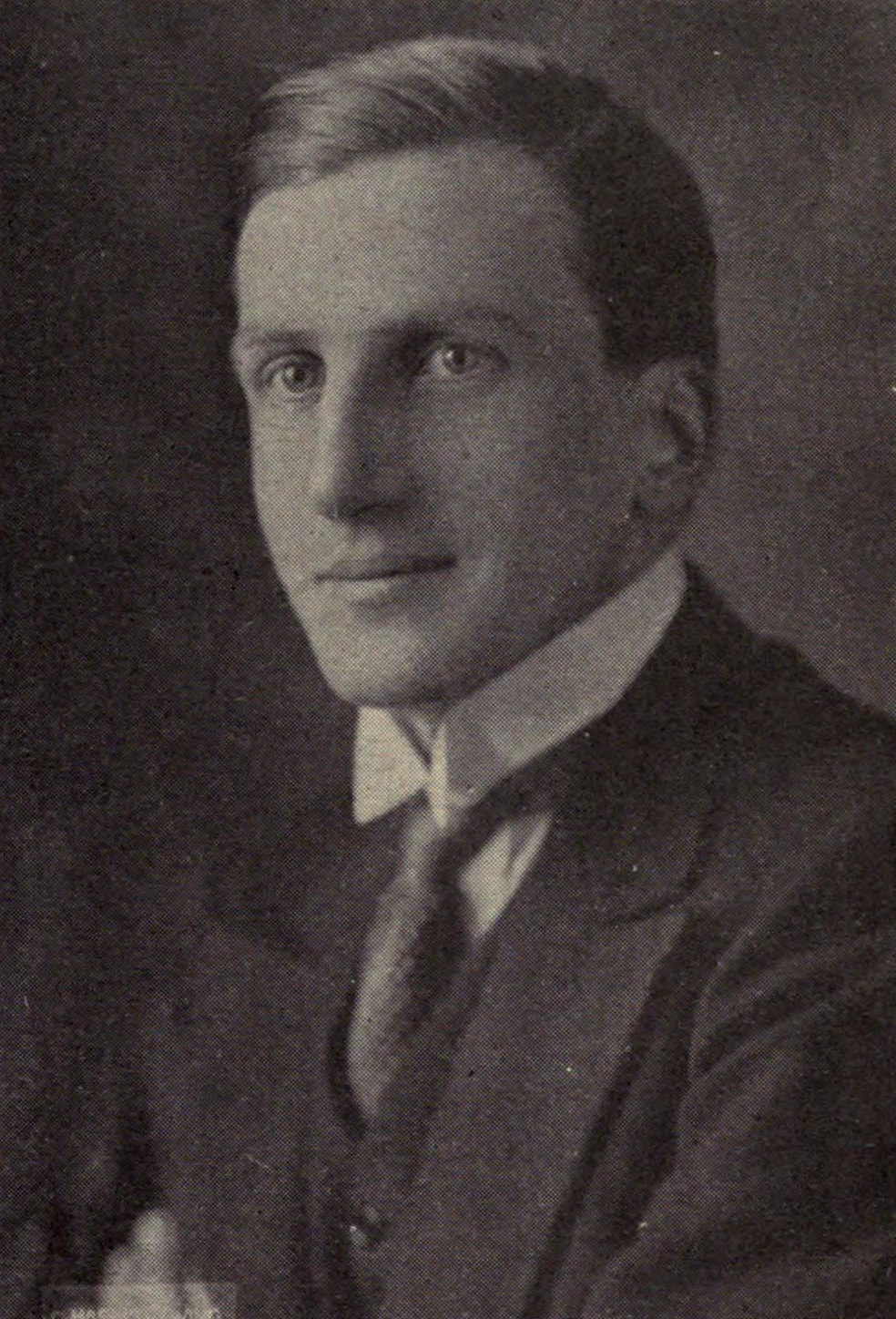
Lord Percy, Conservative (1921-1935)

1921 Hastings by-election
Party	Candidate	Votes	%	±%
Coalition Unionist	Eustace Percy	11,685	54.7	−21.2
Labour	Richard Davies	5,437	25.5	+1.4
Liberal	Arthur Blackman	4,240	19.8	New
Majority		6,248	29.2	−22.6
Turnout		21,362	78.0	+18.8
Registered electors		27,386		
Unionist hold		Swing	−11.3	

General election 1922: Hastings
Party	Candidate	Votes	%	±%
Unionist	Eustace Percy	13,991	68.3	−7.6
Labour	Richard Davies	6,492	31.7	+7.6
Majority		7,499	36.6	−15.2
Turnout		20,483	71.2	+12.0
Registered electors		28,785		
Unionist hold		Swing	−7.6	

Maria Gordon, Liberal (1923)

1923 UK general election: Hastings
Party	Candidate	Votes	%	±%
Unionist	Eustace Percy	11,914	52.6	−15.7
Liberal	Maria Gordon	5,876	25.9	New
Labour	Richard Davies	4,859	21.5	−10.2
Majority		6,038	26.7	−9.9
Turnout		22,649	76.4	+5.2
Registered electors		29,662		
Unionist hold		Swing	−2.8	

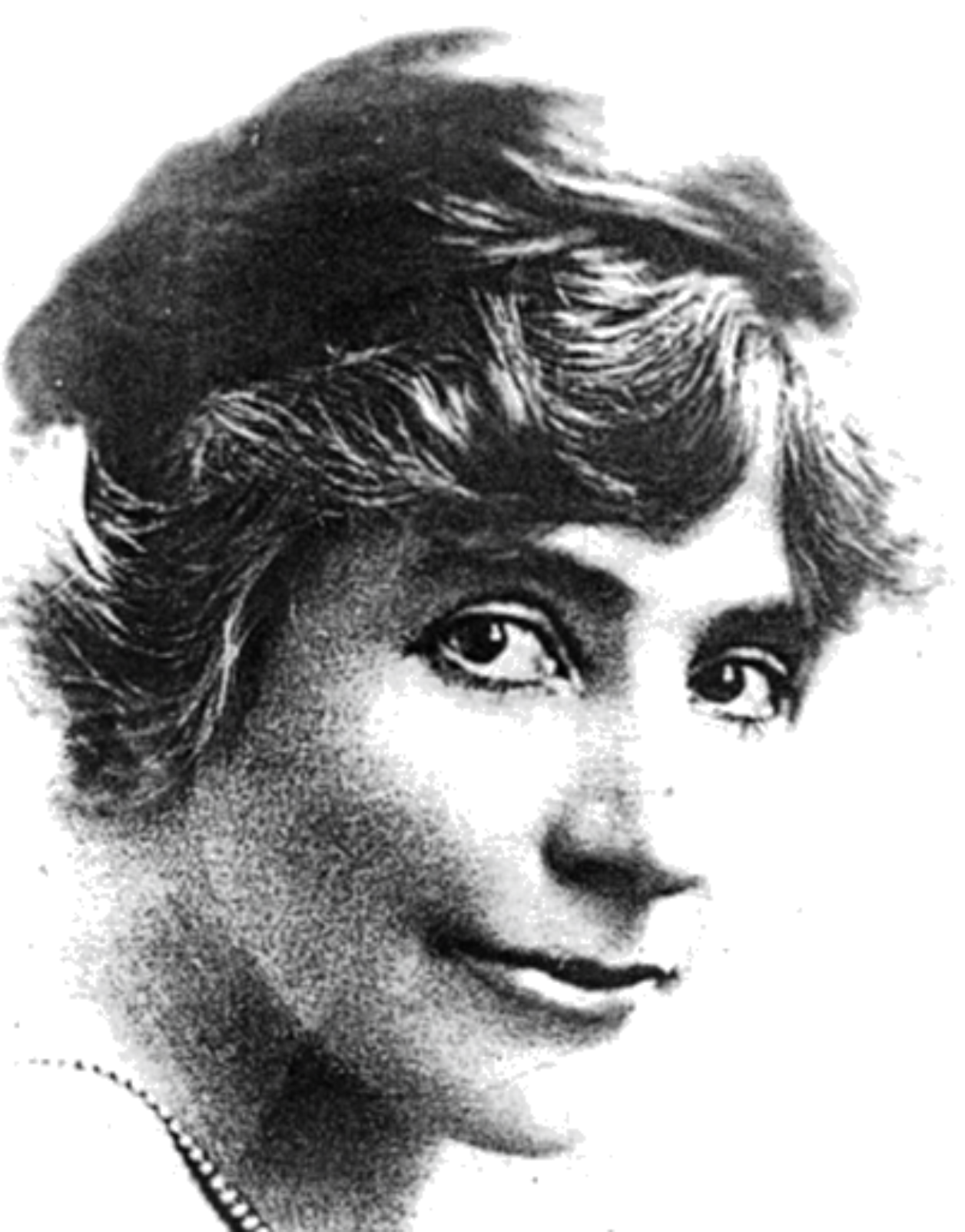
Muriel Matters-Porter, Labour (1924)

General election 1924: Hastings
Party	Candidate	Votes	%	±%
Unionist	Eustace Percy	15,217	71.4	+18.8
Labour	Muriel Matters	6,082	28.6	+7.1
Majority		9,135	42.8	+16.1
Turnout		21,299	70.5	−5.9
Registered electors		30,195		
Unionist hold		Swing	+5.9	

General election 1929: Hastings
Party	Candidate	Votes	%	±%
Unionist	Eustace Percy	15,928	52.3	−19.1
Liberal	Thomas Austen Edwin Spearing	8,004	26.3	New
Labour	Basil Noble	6,516	21.4	−7.2
Majority		7,924	26.0	−16.8
Turnout		30,448	73.4	+2.9
Registered electors		41,503		
Unionist hold		Swing	−6.0	

=== Elections in the 1930s ===
General election 1931: Hastings
Party	Candidate	Votes	%	±%
Conservative	Eustace Percy	22,640	70.3	+18.0
Labour	Irene Goddard	4,983	15.5	−5.9
Liberal	Thomas Austen Edwin Spearing	4,561	14.2	−12.1
Majority		17,657	54.8	+28.8
Turnout		32,184	73.8	+0.4
Conservative hold		Swing		

General election 1935: Hastings
Party	Candidate	Votes	%	±%
Conservative	Eustace Percy	20,905	69.0	−1.3
Labour	William Wate Wood	9,404	31.0	+15.5
Majority		11,501	38.0	−16.8
Turnout		30,309	66.5	−7.3
Conservative hold		Swing		

1937 Hastings by-election
Party	Candidate	Votes	%	±%
Conservative	Maurice Hely-Hutchinson	18,428	62.1	−6.9
Labour	William Wate Wood	11,244	37.9	+6.9
Majority		7,184	24.2	−13.8
Turnout		29,672	65.3	−1.2
Conservative hold		Swing		

General Election 1939/40

Another General Election was required to take place before the end of 1940. The political parties had been making preparations for an election to take place and by the Autumn of 1939, the following candidates had been selected;

- Conservative: Maurice Hely-Hutchinson
- Labour: William Wate Wood

=== Elections in the 1940s ===
General election 1945: Hastings
Party	Candidate	Votes	%	±%
Conservative	Neill Cooper-Key	14,105	51.8	−17.2
Labour	Lewis Gassman	10,580	38.8	+7.8
Independent Progressive	Sydney Muller Parkman	2,564	9.4	New
Majority		3,525	13.0	−25.0
Turnout		27,249	74.9	+8.4
Conservative hold		Swing		

=== Elections in the 1950s ===
General election 1950: Hastings
Party	Candidate	Votes	%	±%
Conservative	Neill Cooper-Key	30,035	52.92	
Labour	Lewis Cohen	17,603	31.01	
Liberal	Peter Leslie Martin Hurd	9,122	16.07	New
Majority		12,432	21.91	
Turnout		56,760	82.14	
Conservative hold		Swing		

General election 1951: Hastings
Party	Candidate	Votes	%	±%
Conservative	Neill Cooper-Key	34,495	63.74	
Labour	Catherine Williamson	19,621	36.26	
Majority		14,874	27.48	
Turnout		54,116	77.36	
Conservative hold		Swing		

General election 1955: Hastings
Party	Candidate	Votes	%	±%
Conservative	Neill Cooper-Key	20,469	55.77	
Labour	Reginald George White	11,933	32.51	
Liberal	John Montgomerie	4,303	11.72	New
Majority		8,536	23.26	
Turnout		36,705	75.69	
Conservative hold		Swing		

General election 1959: Hastings
Party	Candidate	Votes	%	±%
Conservative	Neill Cooper-Key	22,458	62.32	
Labour	James Paterson Bryant	13,576	37.68	
Majority		8,882	24.64	
Turnout		36,034	74.19	
Conservative hold		Swing		

=== Elections in the 1960s ===
General election 1964: Hastings
Party	Candidate	Votes	%	±%
Conservative	Neill Cooper-Key	16,902	44.55	
Labour	Harry Arthur Fountain	11,324	29.85	
Liberal	Jeremy John Arnold	9,716	25.61	New
Majority		5,578	14.70	
Turnout		37,942	76.34	
Conservative hold		Swing		

General election 1966: Hastings
Party	Candidate	Votes	%	±%
Conservative	Neill Cooper-Key	15,324	40.27	
Labour	Cyril Bernard Kissen	12,984	34.12	
Liberal	Jeremy John Arnold	9,744	25.61	
Majority		2,340	6.15	
Turnout		38,052	76.41	
Conservative hold		Swing		

=== Elections in the 1970s ===
General election 1970: Hastings
Party	Candidate	Votes	%	±%
Conservative	Kenneth Warren	20,364	50.61	
Labour	Cyril Bernard Kissen	13,549	33.67	
Liberal	Pamela Maud Shields	6,324	15.72	
Majority		6,815	16.94	
Turnout		40,507	72.77	
Conservative hold		Swing		

General election February 1974: Hastings
Party	Candidate	Votes	%	±%
Conservative	Kenneth Warren	20,075	44.85	
Labour	Michael Foster	12,992	29.02	
Liberal	MG Cass	11,690	26.12	
Majority		7,083	15.83	
Turnout		44,757	79.06	
Conservative hold		Swing		

General election October 1974: Hastings
Party	Candidate	Votes	%	±%
Conservative	Kenneth Warren	18,337	44.93	
Labour	Michael Foster	13,685	33.53	
Liberal	A Leggett	8,793	21.54	
Majority		4,652	11.40	
Turnout		40,815	71.58	
Conservative hold		Swing		

General election 1979: Hastings
Party	Candidate	Votes	%	±%
Conservative	Kenneth Warren	21,311	51.53	
Labour	Michael Foster	12,392	29.96	
Liberal	A Leggett	6,474	15.65	
Independent	GL McNally	839	2.03	New
National Front	HJ Anderson	344	0.83	New
Majority		8,919	21.56	
Turnout		41,360	71.68	
Conservative hold		Swing		
