= Hastings and Rye =

UK Parliament constituency (since 1983)

Coordinates: 50.92°N 0.7°E

- County constituency for the House of Commons
- Interactive map of boundaries since 2024
- Boundary within South East England
- County: East Sussex
- Electorate: 75,581 (2023)
- Major settlements: Hastings; Rye; St Leonards-on-Sea; Winchelsea

Current constituency
- Created: 1983
- Member of Parliament: Helena Dollimore (Labour Co-op)
- Seats: One
- Created from: Hastings; Rye

Hastings and Rye is a constituency (Note: A county constituency (for the purposes of election expenses and type of returning officer)) in East Sussex represented in the House of Commons of the UK Parliament since 2024 by Helena Dollimore of the Labour and Co-operative Party.

== Constituency profile ==
As its name suggests, the main settlements in the constituency are the seaside resort of Hastings and smaller nearby tourist town of Rye. The constituency also includes the Cinque Port of Winchelsea and the villages of Fairlight, Winchelsea Beach, Three Oaks, Guestling, Icklesham, Playden, Iden, Rye Harbour, East Guldeford, Camber, and Pett.

The constituency is set in a relatively isolated part of the southeast from the railways perspective and so does not enjoy some of the more general affluence of this part of the country. In the 2000 index of multiple deprivation a majority of wards fell within the bottom half of rankings so it can arguably be considered a deprived area. Hastings has some light industry, while Rye has a small port, which includes hire and repair activities for leisure vessels and fishing. Hastings is mostly Labour-voting, whereas Rye and the rest of the areas from Rother council are Conservative.

Property prices in the villages are however rising and are in affluent areas, unlike residential estates in the towns. Three Oaks does enjoy a nearby train station for its residents, which has services allowing connecting services to London.

== History ==
The constituency was created in 1983 by combining most of Hastings with a small part of Rye. The Conservative MP for Hastings since 1970, Kenneth Warren, won the new seat. (Note: The Conservative MP for the abolished seat of Rye (since 1955) Bryant Godman Irvine retired). Warren held Hastings and Rye until he chose to retire in 1992; during this period its large majorities suggested it was a Conservative safe seat, with the Liberal Party (now the Liberal Democrats) regularly coming second. Jacqui Lait won the seat on Warren's retirement, but in 1997 the Labour candidate Michael Foster narrowly defeated Lait, becoming the second-least expected (on swing) Labour MP in the landslide of that year and since 2001 setting a pattern that suggests the seat is a two-way Labour-Conservative marginal.

Foster held the seat, again with slim majorities over Conservatives, in 2001 and 2005, but lost it to Conservative Amber Rudd in 2010. Rudd was re-elected with an increased majority in 2015, but in the 2017 general election, the Green Party declined to contest the seat and instead called on its supporters to back the Labour candidate. Rudd held the seat with a slim majority of 346, making it the 24th-closest nationally (of 650 seats). From 2010 until 2019, Rudd served as Secretary of State for Energy and Climate Change, Minister for Women and Equalities, Secretary of State for the Home Department and Secretary of State for Work and Pensions under the governments of David Cameron, Theresa May and Boris Johnson.

After losing the Conservative whip, Rudd did not stand at the 2019 general election, which was won for the Conservatives by Sally-Ann Hart. In 2024, Helena Dollimore recaptured the seat for Labour with a majority of 18.8%.

== Boundaries ==
Map of boundaries 2010–2024

1983–2010: The Borough of Hastings, and the District of Rother wards of Camber, Fairlight, Guestling and Pett, Rye, and Winchelsea.

2010–2024: The Borough of Hastings, and the District of Rother wards of Brede Valley, Eastern Rother, Marsham, and Rye.

2024–present: The Borough of Hastings, and the District of Rother wards of Eastern Rother, Rye & Winchelsea, and Southern Rother.

Minor changes to bring the electorate within the permitted range and align to new ward boundaries in the District of Rother.

== Members of Parliament ==
Hastings prior to 1983

Election	Member	Party
1983	Kenneth Warren	Conservative
1992	Jacqui Lait	Conservative
1997	Michael Foster	Labour
2010	Amber Rudd	Conservative
September 2019	Amber Rudd	Independent
2019	Sally-Ann Hart	Conservative
2024	Helena Dollimore	Labour Co-op

== Elections ==
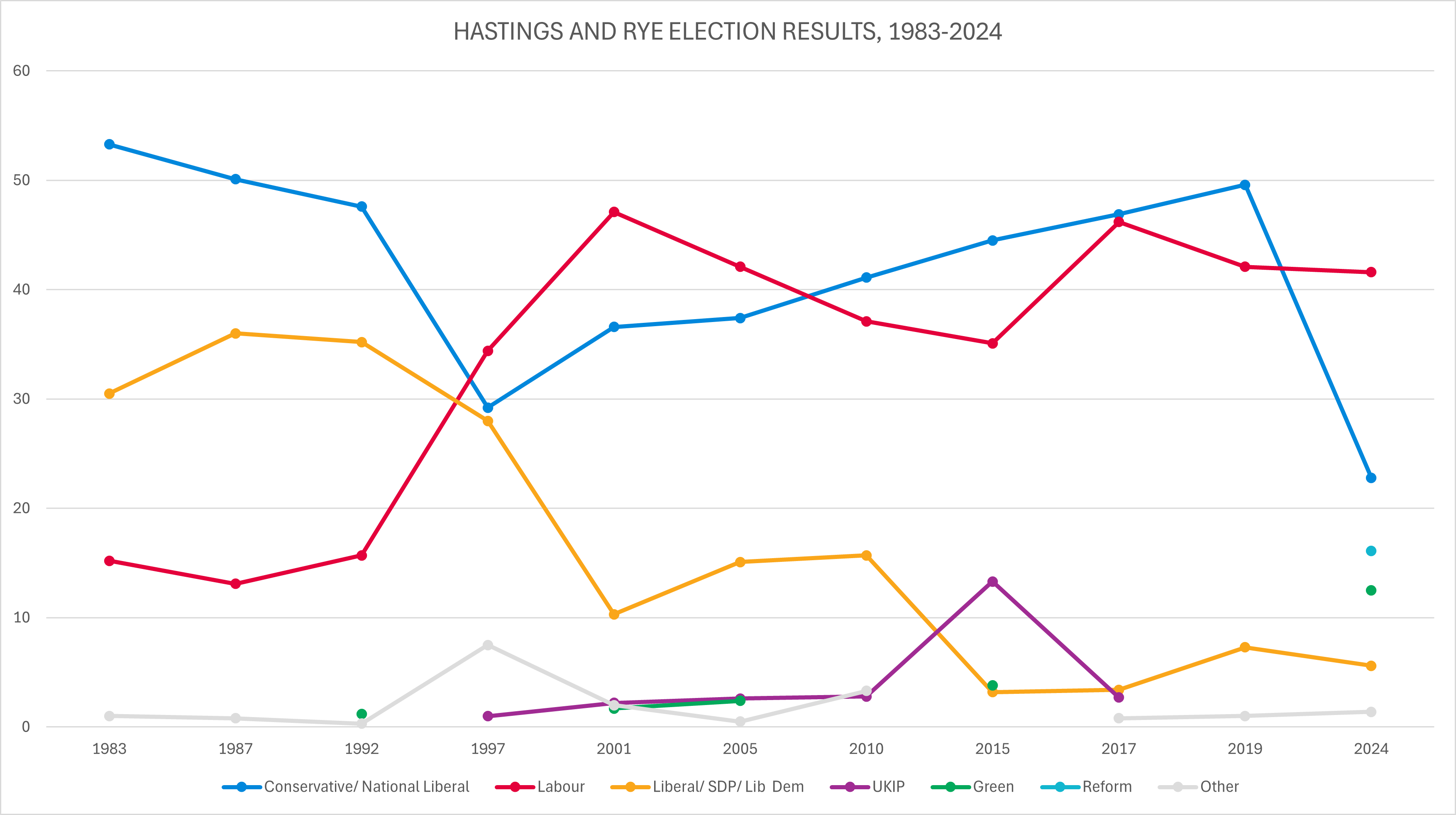
Election results 1983-2024

=== Elections in the 2020s ===
2024 general election: Hastings and Rye
Party	Candidate	Votes	%	±%
Labour Co-op	Helena Dollimore	19,134	41.6	−0.8
Conservative	Sally-Ann Hart	10,481	22.8	−26.3
Reform UK	Lucian Fernando	7,401	16.1	N/A
Green	Becca Horn	5,761	12.5	+12.4
Liberal Democrats	Guy Harris	2,586	5.6	−1.8
Workers Party	Philip Colle	362	0.8	N/A
Communist	Nicholas Davies	136	0.3	N/A
Independent	Paul Crosland	129	0.3	−0.8
Majority		8,653	18.8	N/A
Turnout		45,990	60.6	−8.9
Registered electors		75,939		
Labour Co-op gain from Conservative		Swing	▲12.8	

=== Elections in the 2010s ===
2019 notional result
Party	Vote	%
Conservative	25,804	49.1
Labour	22,272	42.4
Liberal Democrats	3,892	7.4
Others	565	1.1
Green	33	0.1
Turnout	52,566	69.5
Electorate	75,581	

2019 general election: Hastings and Rye
Party	Candidate	Votes	%	±%
Conservative	Sally-Ann Hart	26,896	49.6	+2.7
Labour	Peter Chowney	22,853	42.1	−4.1
Liberal Democrats	Nick Perry	3,960	7.3	+3.9
Independent	Paul Crosland	565	1.0	N/A
Majority		4,043	7.5	+6.8
Turnout		54,274	67.4	−4.2
Conservative hold		Swing	+3.4	

2017 general election: Hastings and Rye
Party	Candidate	Votes	%	±%
Conservative	Amber Rudd	25,668	46.9	+2.4
Labour	Peter Chowney	25,322	46.2	+11.1
Liberal Democrats	Nick Perry	1,885	3.4	+0.2
UKIP	Michael Phillips	1,479	2.7	−10.6
Independent	Nicholas Wilson	412	0.8	N/A
Majority		346	0.7	−8.7
Turnout		54,766	71.6	+3.6
Conservative hold		Swing	-4.4	

2015 general election: Hastings and Rye
Party	Candidate	Votes	%	±%
Conservative	Amber Rudd	22,686	44.5	+3.4
Labour	Sarah Owen	17,890	35.1	−2.0
UKIP	Andrew Michael	6,786	13.3	+10.5
Green	Jake Bowers	1,951	3.8	+3.8
Liberal Democrats	Nick Perry	1,614	3.2	−12.5
Majority		4,796	9.4	+5.4
Turnout		50,927	68.0	+4.1
Conservative hold		Swing	+2.7	

2010 general election: Hastings and Rye
Party	Candidate	Votes	%	±%
Conservative	Amber Rudd	20,468	41.1	+3.0
Labour	Michael Foster	18,475	37.1	−3.5
Liberal Democrats	Nick Perry	7,825	15.7	+0.6
UKIP	Anthony Smith	1,397	2.8	+0.1
BNP	Nick Prince	1,310	2.6	+2.6
English Democrat	Rod Bridger	339	0.7	+0.7
Majority		1,993	4.0	N/A
Turnout		49,814	63.9	+4.9
Conservative gain from Labour		Swing	+3.3	

=== Elections in the 2000s ===
2005 general election: Hastings and Rye
Party	Candidate	Votes	%	±%
Labour	Michael Foster	18,107	42.1	−5.0
Conservative	Mark Coote	16,081	37.4	+0.8
Liberal Democrats	Richard Stevens	6,479	15.1	+4.8
UKIP	Terry Grant	1,098	2.6	+0.4
Green	Sally Phillips	1,032	2.4	+0.7
Monster Raving Loony	Viscount Clarkey of Rochdale Canal Ord-Clarke	207	0.5	0.0
Majority		2,026	4.7	−5.8
Turnout		43,004	59.1	+0.7
Labour hold		Swing	-2.9	

2001 general election: Hastings and Rye
Party	Candidate	Votes	%	±%
Labour	Michael Foster	19,402	47.1	+12.7
Conservative	Mark Coote	15,094	36.6	+7.4
Liberal Democrats	Graem Peters	4,266	10.3	−17.7
UKIP	Alan Coomber	911	2.2	+1.2
Green	Sally Phillips	721	1.7	N/A
Independent	Gillian Bargery	486	1.2	N/A
Monster Raving Loony	John Ord-Clarke	198	0.5	+0.2
Rock 'n' Roll Loony	Brett McLean	140	0.3	N/A
Majority		4,308	10.5	+5.3
Turnout		41,218	58.4	−11.3
Labour hold		Swing	+2.6	

=== Elections in the 1990s ===
1997 general election: Hastings and Rye
Party	Candidate	Votes	%	±%
Labour	Michael Foster	16,867	34.4	+18.7
Conservative	Jacqui Lait	14,307	29.2	−18.4
Liberal Democrats	Monroe Palmer	13,717	28.0	−7.2
Referendum	Christopher J.M. McGovern	2,511	5.1	N/A
Liberal	Jane M.E. Amstad	1,046	2.1	N/A
UKIP	W.N. Andrews	472	1.0	N/A
Monster Raving Loony	Derek Tiverton	149	0.3	0.0
Majority		2,560	5.2	N/A
Turnout		49,069	69.7	−5.2
Labour gain from Conservative		Swing	+18.5	

1992 general election: Hastings and Rye
Party	Candidate	Votes	%	±%
Conservative	Jacqui Lait	25,573	47.6	−2.5
Liberal Democrats	Monroe Palmer	18,939	35.2	−0.8
Labour	Richard D. Stevens	8,458	15.7	+2.6
Green	Sally Philips	640	1.2	N/A
Monster Raving Loony	Lord of Howell Derek Tiverton	168	0.3	−0.1
Majority		6,634	12.4	−1.7
Turnout		53,778	74.9	+3.1
Conservative hold		Swing	−0.9	

=== Elections in the 1980s ===
1987 general election: Hastings and Rye
Party	Candidate	Votes	%	±%
Conservative	Kenneth Warren	26,163	50.1	−3.2
Liberal	David Amies	18,816	36.0	+5.5
Labour	Joy Hurcombe	6,825	13.1	−2.1
Monster Raving Loony	Lord of Howell Derek Tiverton	242	0.4	N/A
Independent	Stanley Davies	194	0.4	N/A
Majority		7,347	14.1	−12.7
Turnout		52,240	71.8	+2.9
Conservative hold		Swing	−4.4	

1983 general election: Hastings and Rye
Party	Candidate	Votes	%	±%
Conservative	Kenneth Warren	25,626	53.3	N/A
Liberal	David Amies	14,646	30.5	N/A
Labour	Nigel Knowles	7,304	15.2	N/A
Independent	G.L. McNally	503	1.0	N/A
Majority		10,980	22.8	N/A
Turnout		48,079	68.9	N/A
Conservative win (new seat)				

== See also ==
- Parliamentary constituencies in East Sussex
- List of parliamentary constituencies in the South East England (region)

== Sources ==
- Election 2005 Result: Hastings & Rye BBC News, 23 May 2005
- Vote 2001 – Hastings & Rye BBC News, 8 June 2001
- Election results, 1997 – 2001 Election Demon
- Election results, 1983 – 1992 Election Demon
