= Frederick North (MP) =

British Liberal politician

Frederick North DL, JP (2 July 1800, Hastings – 29 October 1869), was a British Liberal politician. North was an MP for Hastings from 1831 to 1835, 1854 to 1865, and 1868 to 1869. He was also a Deputy Lieutenant and Justice of the Peace for Norfolk.

North was third cousin of Prime Minister Lord Frederick North, both great-great-grandsons of Dudley North, 4th Baron North. His daughter, Marianne North, was a notable traveller and botanical illustrator, while his granddaughter, Katharine Furse, was the first female admiral and the first Director of the Women's Royal Naval Service.

== Early life and education ==
North was the son of Francis Frederick North and Elizabeth Whitear. He was the great-grandson of the Hon. Roger North and the third cousin of Prime Minister Lord North, both great-great-grandsons of Dudley North, 4th Baron North. North's mother was the daughter of Reverend William Whitear. North was educated at Harrow and St John's College, Cambridge. He earned a Bachelor of Arts in 1822 and a Master of Arts in 1825. He also studied at the Middle Temple.

== Political career ==
North entered Parliament as one of two representatives for Hastings in 1831, a seat he held until 1835 and again between 1854 and 1865 and 1868 and 1869. He was also a Deputy Lieutenant and Justice of the Peace for Norfolk.

The highest point in Hastings is now named North's Seat in his honour, from which France can be seen on a clear day.

== Personal life and death ==
North married Janet, daughter of Sir John Marjoribanks M.P., 1st Baronet of Lees in the County of Berwick, in 1825. They had three children, a son Charles, a barrister, and two daughters, Marianne, who became a notable traveller and botanical illustrator and Janet Catherine North Symonds. North's wife died in January 1855. North remained a widower until his death in October 1869, aged 69.

North was also the grandfather of Katharine Furse, the first ever female admiral and the inaugural Director of the Women's Royal Naval Service.

Parliament of the United Kingdom
Preceded by Joseph Planta; Sir Henry Fane	Member of Parliament for Hastings; 1831–1837; With: John Ashley Warre 1831–1835; Howard Elphinstone 1835–1837	Succeeded by Joseph Planta; Robert Hollond
Preceded by Musgrave Brisco; Patrick Robertson	Member of Parliament for Hastings; 1854–1865; With: Patrick Robertson 1854–1859; Lord Harry Vane 1859–1864; Hon. George Waldegrave-Leslie 1864–1865	Succeeded by Hon. George Waldegrave-Leslie; Patrick Robertson
Preceded by Hon. George Waldegrave-Leslie; Patrick Robertson	Member of Parliament for Hastings; 1868–1869; With: Thomas Brassey	Succeeded by Thomas Brassey; Ughtred Kay-Shuttleworth
