= 1st Cinque Ports Rifle Volunteers =

1st Cinque Ports Rifle Volunteers 5th (Cinque Ports) Bn, Royal Sussex Regiment 109th (Royal Sussex) LAA Regiment, RA
- Active: 17 December 1859–9 March 1946
- Country: United Kingdom
- Branch: Volunteer Force/Territorial Force
- Role: Infantry; Air defence
- Size: 1–3 Battalions
- Part of: 48th (South Midland) Division; 44th (Home Counties) Division; 12th (Eastern) Division
- Garrison/HQ: Middle Street, Hastings
- Engagements: Second Boer War; First World War; Battle of Aubers Ridge; Battle of the Somme; Third Battle of Ypres; Italian Campaign; Second World War; Battle of France; Defence of Amiens; Second Battle of El Alamein; North West Europe

Commanders
- Notable commanders: Hon George Waldegrave; Hon Henry Hall Gage; Arthur Montagu Brookfield; Frederick Langham

The 1st Cinque Ports Rifle Volunteers was a part-time unit of the British Army first raised from the Cinque Ports of Kent and Sussex in 1859. It later became the 5th (Cinque Ports) Battalion of the Royal Sussex Regiment. During the First World War, it served on the Western front as pioneers, seeing a great deal of action at Aubers Ridge, the Somme, Ypres, and in Italy. In the Second World War, both the battalion and its duplicate served in the Battle of France and were evacuated from Dunkirk. The 5th Battalion then fought at the Second Battle of El Alamein while its duplicate unit served as an anti-aircraft regiment in the campaign in North West Europe. Neither unit was reformed after the war.

== Volunteer Force ==
An invasion scare in 1859 led to the emergence of the Volunteer Movement, and Rifle Volunteer Corps (RVCs) began to be organised throughout Great Britain. A number of these were formed in the Cinque Ports towns along the coast of Sussex and Kent. The 1st Cinque Ports RVC, commanded by Captain the Hon George Waldegrave, was raised out of the Hastings Rifle Club, which in all but name was the successor of the old Cinque Ports Volunteers of about 1789. The volunteers drilled at the Market Hall in George Street and began rifle practice at Rock-a-Nore, where they shot at targets set at the base of the cliffs. Later that year, Lady Waldegrave allowed them to set up a range shooting across Ecclesbourne Glen, which they used for many years until a new rifle range was opened in Warren Glen in May 1901. Most of the volunteers provided their own rifles and the corps funded its own uniforms. By the middle of 1859 it had reached 70 members, and was officially adopted on 17 December 1859.

An Administrative Battalion to control the Cinque Ports RVCs was formed at Hastings in late 1860 under the command of Lieutenant-Colonel the Hon Henry Hall Gage of the Royal Sussex Light Infantry Militia:

1st Administrative Battalion, Cinque Ports Rifle Volunteer Corps

- 1st (Hastings) Cinque Ports RVC, formed 17 December 1859
- 2nd (Ramsgate) Cinque Ports RVC, formed as 2nd Kent RVC 18 September 1859; joined April 1860; transferred to 2nd Cinque Ports Admin Battalion December 1861
- 3rd (Rye and Tenterden) Cinque Ports RVC, formed as 2nd Cinque Ports RVC with half-companies at Rye and Tenterden, 4 January 1860; renumbered when 2nd Kent RVC joined; Rye portion broke up by September 1861, with members joining either the 1st Cinque Ports RVC or the 1st Cinque Ports Artillery Volunteers, and HQ moved to Tenterden; transferred to 5th Kent Admin Bn December 1861
- 4th (Hythe) Cinque Ports RVC, formed 13 February 1860 as the 1st Subdivision, numbered 4th RVC April 1860; transferred to 2nd Cinque Ports Admin Bn December 1861
- 5th (Folkestone) Cinque Ports RVC, formed on 30 March 1860 as a result of a public meeting at the Old King's Arms Assembly Rooms; transferred to 2nd Cinque Ports Admin Bn December 1861
- 6th (Deal and Walmer) Cinque Ports RVC, formed as 3rd Subdivision at Deal on 20 April 1860 under the command of Colonel Julius Backhouse, CB, formerly of the Bengal Artillery; transferred to 2nd Cinque Ports Admin Bn December 1861
- 7th (Margate) Cinque Ports RVC, formed 22 March 1860; transferred to 2nd Cinque Ports Admin Bn December 1861
- 8th (Dover) Cinque Ports RVC, formed 30 July 1860; transferred to 2nd Cinque Ports Admin Bn December 1861
- 9th (Rye) Cinque Ports RVC, formed 12 December 1864 from Rye elements of 1st Cinque Ports RVC (see 3rd Cinque Ports RVC); absorbed into 1st Cinque Ports RVC 1876
- 2nd (Cuckfield) Sussex RVC, formed 2 December 1859; transferred from 3rd Sussex Admin Bn 1863; transferred to 2nd Sussex Admin Bn 1870
- 4th (Lewes) Sussex RVC, formed 25 January 1860; transferred from 3rd Sussex Admin Bn 1863
- 16th (Battle) Sussex RVC, formed 19 May 1860; transferred from 3rd Sussex Admin Bn 1861; absorbed into 4th Sussex RVC 1876
- 17th (Etchingham) Sussex RVC, formed 4 June 1860; transferred from 5th Kent Admin Bn 1861; absorbed into 4th Sussex RVC 1876
- 19th (Eastbourne) Sussex RVC, formed 6 October 1860; transferred from 3rd Sussex Admin Bn 1861; disbanded 1868
- 20th (Uckfield) Sussex RVC, formed 27 October 1870; absorbed into 1st Cinque Ports RVC 1876

The 2nd Administrative Battalion, Cinque Ports Rifle Volunteer Corps formed at Dover in December 1861 took over the 2nd, 4th, 5th, 6th (disbanded 1863), 7th, and 8th Cinque Ports RVCs, later joined by:

- 10th (New Romney) Cinque Ports RVC, formed 22 December 1864

The 2nd Admin Bn was broken up in 1874, its corps being either absorbed into the 5th Kent RVC or added to the 4th Kent Admin Bn.

A drill hall was opened in Middle Street, Hastings, in 1861, to be used by the Cinque Ports Rifles and the 1st Cinque Ports Artillery Volunteers. A replacement building was erected on the same site in 1895.

Under the 'Localisation of the Forces' scheme introduced by the Cardwell Reforms of 1872, Volunteers were grouped into county brigades with their local Regular and Militia battalions. This was in Sub-District No 43 in South Eastern District for the Cinque Ports Battalion, grouped with the 35th (Royal Sussex) and 107th Regiments of Foot, the Royal Sussex Light Infantry Militia and the 1st and 2nd Sussex RVCs.

== Royal Sussex Regiment ==
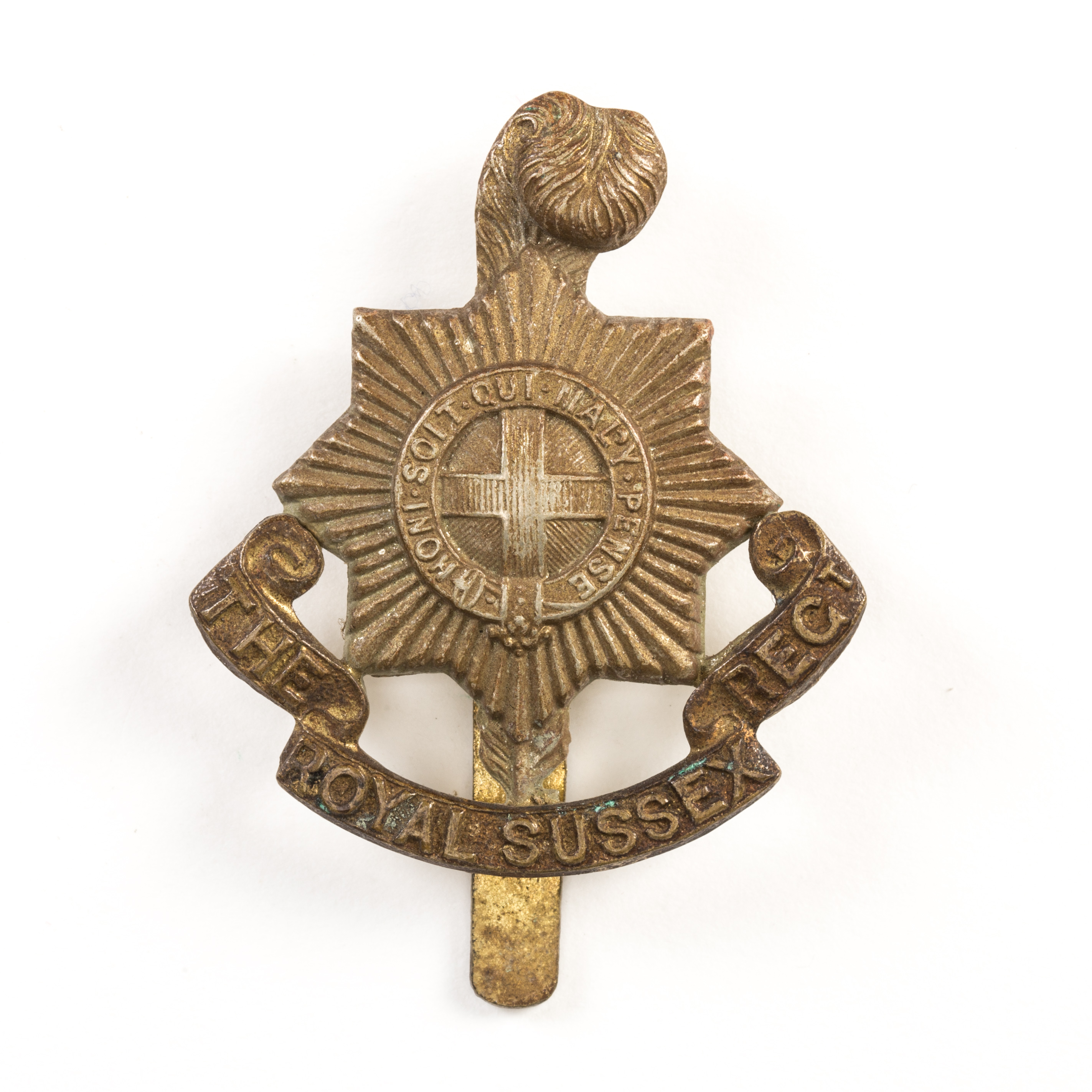
Cap badge of the Royal Sussex Regiment.

When the RVCs were consolidated in 1880, the 1st Admin Bn became the 1st Cinque Ports (Cinque Ports and Sussex) Rifle Volunteers. The Childers Reforms of 1881 took Cardwell's reforms further, the linked battalions becoming county regiments to which the Volunteers were formally affiliated. The 35th and 107th became the Royal Sussex Regiment on 1 July 1881, the 1st Cinque Ports becoming its third volunteer battalion (VB), but without changing its title. The 1st Cinque Ports now had the following organisation:

- A Company at Hastings – from 1st Cinque Ports
- B Company at Battle – from 1st Cinque Ports
- C Company at Ticehurst – from 1st Cinque Ports
- D Company at Lewes – from 4th Sussex
- E Company at Rye – formed 1885
- F Company at Hastings – formed 1887
- G Company at Crowborough – formed 1890
- H Company at Ore – formed 1890
- I Company at Hastings – formed 1900
- K Company at Ore – formed 1900
- Eastbourne College Cadet Corps – formed 1896

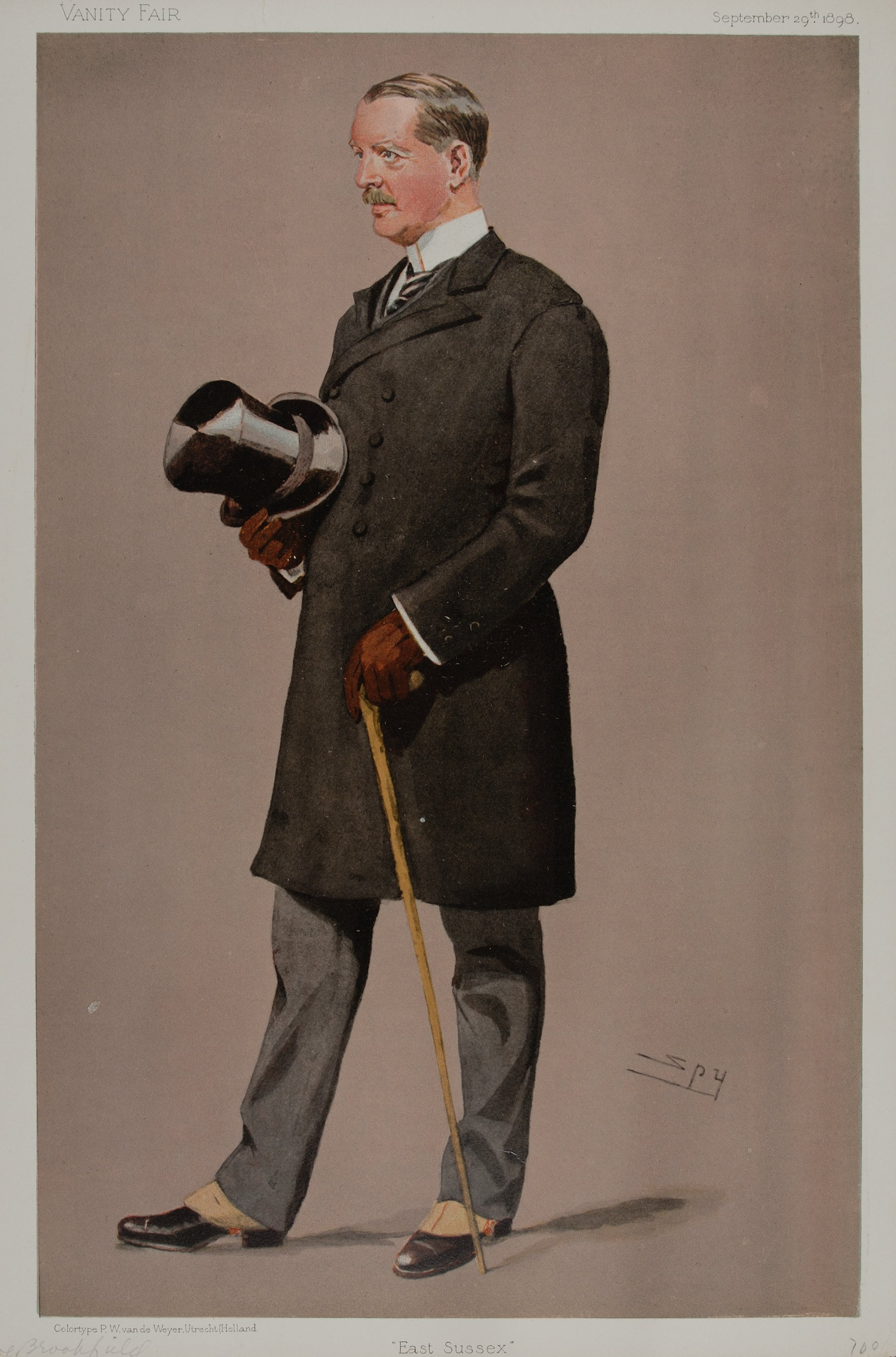
Arthur Brookfield, a supporter of the Volunteers in the Commons, caricatured as 'East Sussex' by 'Spy' in Vanity Fair, September 1898.

Arthur Montagu Brookfield, a former lieutenant in the 13th Hussars, took over as commanding officer (CO) with the rank of lieutenant-colonel on 13 September 1884. He found problems obtaining suitable officers: the local rural gentry were distrustful of military service and it was difficult to persuade busy professional men to take commissions. Brookfield was elected MP for Rye in 1885, and became secretary of the influential Service Members' Committee in the House of Commons, helping to counter the antipathy of senior army officers towards the volunteers.

While Cardwell's sub-districts were later referred to as 'brigades', they were purely administrative organisations and the Volunteers were excluded from the 'mobilisation' part of the scheme. The Stanhope Memorandum of December 1888 proposed a more comprehensive Mobilisation Scheme for Volunteer units, which would assemble in their own brigades at key points in case of war. In peacetime these brigades provided a structure for collective training. Under this scheme the 1st Cinque Ports formed part of the Dover Brigade, later entitled the South Eastern Brigade, before the Royal Sussex VBs formed their own Sussex Brigade at the end of the 1890s. This became the Sussex and Kent Brigade in the early 1900s.

=== Second Boer War ===
After Black Week in December 1899, the Volunteers were invited to send active service units to assist the Regulars in the Second Boer War. The War Office decided that one company 116 strong could be recruited from the volunteer battalions of any infantry regiment that had a regular battalion serving in South Africa. The Royal Sussex's VBs accordingly raised a service company that joined the 1st Battalion and earned the volunteer battalions their first Battle honour: South Africa 1900–02. The 1st Cinque Ports Rifles contingent left Hastings in February 1900, and a second contingent in February 1901.

Meanwhile, the 1st Cinque Ports' CO, Lt-Col Arthur Brookfield, commanded the 14th Battalion of the Imperial Yeomanry in South Africa. It is possible that some of his volunteers joined the 69th (Sussex) Company of this battalion, which was sponsored by the Sussex Yeomanry. Brookfield retired from the command of the Cinque Ports battalion in 1903 when he joined the Consular service, and was replaced by Brevet Colonel Charles Cafe, a retired regular officer.

== Territorial Force ==
When the Volunteers were subsumed into the new Territorial Force (TF) under the Haldane Reforms of 1908, the battalion became the 5th (Cinque Ports) Battalion, Royal Sussex Regiment:

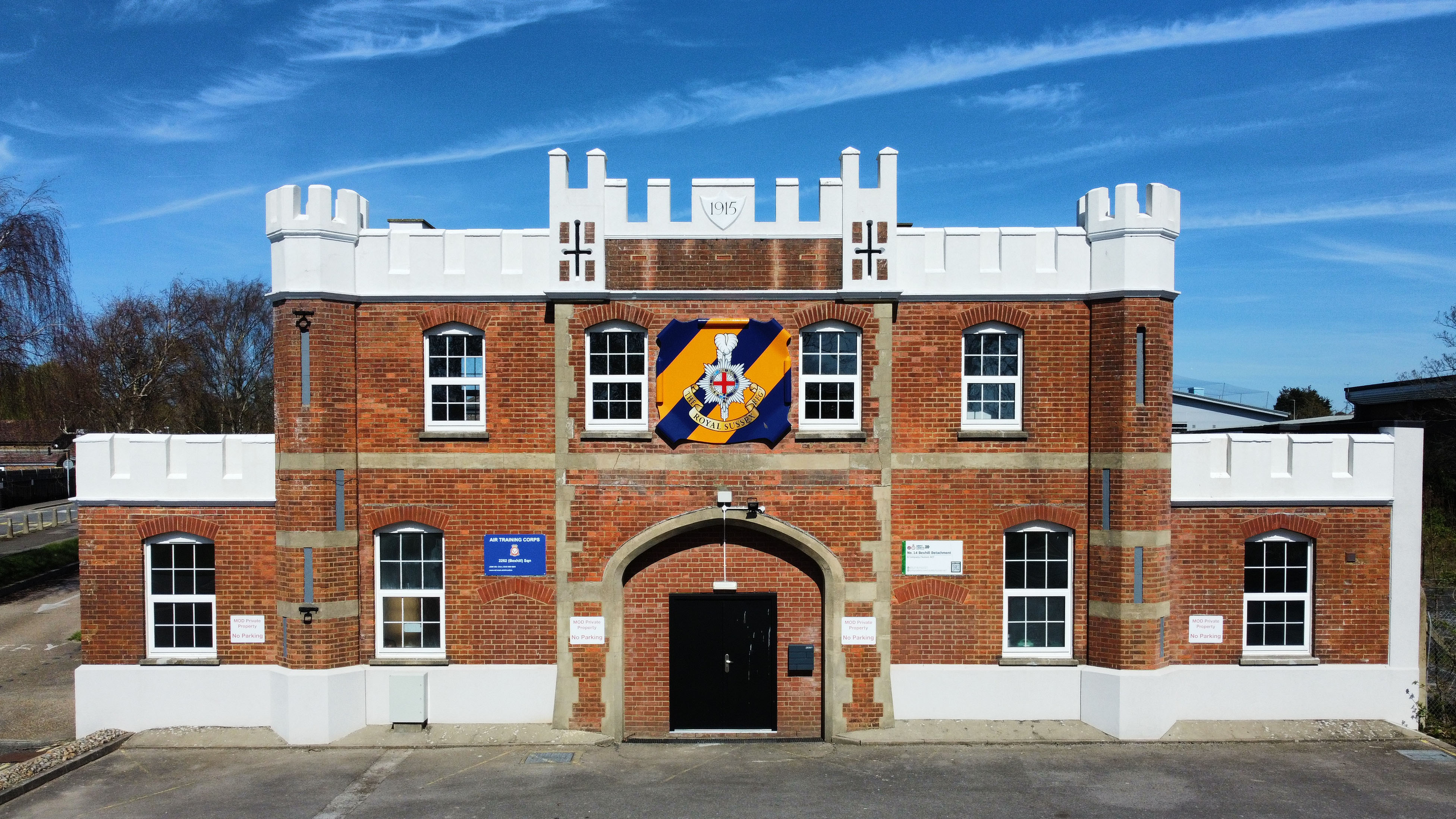
The drill hall at Down Road, Bexhill-on-Sea.

- HQ at Drill Hall, Middle Street, Hastings
- A Company at Hastings
- B Company at Drill Hall, North TradeRoad, Battle, with detachments at Dallington, Robertsbridge, Sedlescombe and Staplecross
- C Company at Wadhurst, with detachments at Pashley Road, Ticehurst, Burwash, Flimwell, Frant and Hurst Green
- D Company at Market Street, Lewes, with detachments at Glynde and Stanmer
- E Company at Volunteers' Armoury, Cinque Ports Street, Rye; moved to Drill Hall, Windmill Lane, in 1912, with detachments at Icklesham, Northiam and Peasmarsh
- F Company at Framfield Road, Uckfield, with detachments at Buxted, East Hoathly, Hadlow Down, Heathfield, Newick and Nutley
- G Company at Drill Hall, Fermor Road, Crowborough, with detachments at Blackham, Groombridge, Hartfield, Mayfield and Rotherfield
- H Company at Grove Road, Ore, with Left Half at the Drill Hall at Down Road, Bexhill-on-Sea, shared with 6th Sussex Battery, Royal Field Artillery and D Squadron, Sussex Yeomanry, and a detachment at Westfield
- Eastbourne College Cadet Corps joined the Junior Division of the Officers' Training Corps

The two TF battalions of the Royal Sussex (4th and 5th) were not included in the Home Counties Division, but were attached to it as 'Army Troops'.

Before the First World War, the CO was Lt-Col Frederick George Langham, VD, of the Hastings solicitors Young Coles & Langdon. He had been commissioned into the battalion on 13 March 1886, promoted to captain on 3 January 1891 and major on 4 November 1896. He was appointed Honorary Lt-Col on 28 July 1906, and promoted to Lt-Col in command in succession to Col Cafe on 21 October 1911. His younger brother Edward Hennah Langham was also commissioned into the battalion on 11 March 1896 and his son Cecil Richard on 19 August 1910. The Rev William Streatfeild, later Bishop of Lewes, was one of the battalion's chaplains, with the rank of Chaplain 4th Class (TF).

== First World War ==
=== Mobilisation ===
5th (Cinque Ports) Bn assembled at Bordon Camp for its annual training on 26 July 1914, which included a four-day march to Salisbury, arriving on 3 August. Next day war was declared and the battalion returned to Hastings to mobilise before proceeding to its war station at Dover Castle.

TF units and formations were invited to volunteer for Overseas Service, and on 15 August 1914, the War Office issued instructions to separate those men who had signed up for Home Service only, and form these into reserve units. On 31 August, the formation of a reserve or 2nd Line unit was authorised for each 1st Line unit where 60 per cent or more of the men had volunteered for Overseas Service. The titles of these 2nd Line units would be the same as the original, but distinguished by a '2/' prefix. In this way duplicate battalions, brigades and divisions were created, mirroring those TF formations being sent overseas. Later 3rd Line units were formed to train reinforcements for the others.

In September the Home Counties Division began to send battalions to Gibraltar to relieve the Regular garrison for active service with the British Expeditionary Force (BEF) on the Western Front. Then at the end of October the whole division went to India to replace the Regulars. However the attached Royal Sussex battalions remained in England.

=== 1/5th (Cinque Ports) Battalion ===
After mobilisation the battalion adopted the four-company organisation that was standard in the regulars:

- A (Hastings) and E (Rye) became A Company
- B (Battle) and F (Uckfield) became B Company
- C (Ticehurst) and D (Lewes) became C Company
- G (Crowborough) and H (Ore) became D Company

Later in 1914 the battalion was posted for duty at the Tower of London, where Lt-Col Langham had to arrange the execution by firing squad of the German spy Carl Hans Lody on 6 November. The selected spot, in the moat, turned out to be in public view, so Langham had to move the execution hurriedly to the indoor miniature rifle range. The firing party was from 3rd Bn Grenadier Guards.

In early 1915 the battalion was selected to go to France to reinforce the regulars with the BEF, and on 18 February it travelled from the Tower to Southampton to embarked on the SS Pancras, landing at Boulogne under Lt-Col Langham next day. On 21 February it joined 2nd Brigade (in which 2nd Bn Sussex was serving) in 1st Division.

This formation had been badly cut up in the battles of 1914 and was still weak in numbers. On 10 March it was holding an exceptionally wet part of the front line, which was unsuitable for making an attack, so when the neighbouring formations launched the Battle of Neuve Chapelle, 1st Division's participation was limited to supporting rifle fire. 1/5th Sussex began sending working parties to the front and on 18 March it took over a section of frontline trenches near Festubert from 2nd Royal Sussex. For the next few weeks it alternated with its regular battalion, working on improving trenches while in the line and suffering a trickle of casualties from the low-level Trench warfare. The battalion was bombed by German mortars on 29 April, and came under heavy bombardment on 1 May, suffering a number of casualties.

==== Aubers Ridge ====
1st Division was chosen to deliver the attack at the Battle of Aubers Ridge on 9 May; 1/5th Battalion was in support for 2nd Bde's assault. When the artillery bombardment entered its intense phase at 05.30 the leading battalions (including 2nd Sussex) clambered over their breastworks to establish themselves in No man's land about 80 yards (73 m) from the German defences. As soon as they went 'over the top' the leading waves were hit by heavy machine gun fire: many were killed on their own ladders and parapets, but the others went forward at the double and formed a general line; the supporting battalions followed up. When the guns lifted at 05.40, the leading waves dashed forwards, but were met by devastating machine gun and rifle fire. The bombardment had failed to suppress the defenders, cut the barbed wire or make gaps in the German parapets. None of the assaulting wave got beyond the German parapet, and the 1/5th Sussex, following up, 'merely fell victims to German machine gun fire'. A renewed bombardment was begun at 06.15, but a second attempt to attack at 07.00 failed in the same way. For 1st Division the battle was over by 07.20; 1/5th Sussex had lost 11 officers and 191 other ranks (ORs) out of about 600 who went into action. After Aubers, 1st Division moved to the Cuinchy–Givenchy sector, which it defended while the next attack (the Battle of Festubert) was carried out nearby. During August the battalion was engaged in building a new camp at 'Garden City'.

==== Somme ====
On 20 August 1915 1/5th Royal Sussex moved to Hébuterne on the Somme where it transferred to a TF formation, the 48th (South Midland) Division, to serve as its pioneer battalion. The role of divisional pioneers was to provide working parties to assist the divisional Royal Engineers (RE) in tasks ranging from trench digging and wiring, to roadmaking and consolidating captured positions, while remaining fighting soldiers. In 1916 the CO's son, Capt Cecil Langham, formed the divisional Scout and Sniper Section, known as 'Langham's Scouts', with personnel drawn from the 1/5th Sussex.

The Somme was a quiet sector until the Spring of 1916, when preparations began for the 'Big Push' (the Battle of the Somme), involving huge amounts of engineering work, creating supply dumps and making roads, cable trenches, dugouts and shelters, sometimes under shellfire. Most of 48th (SM) Division was out of the line in corps reserve for the First day on the Somme (1 July) – the first time the battalion had been concentrated in one place for 11 months – but was ordered to repeat 29th Division's failed attack next day. Two brigades prepared to attack, each with two battalions in line, and one company of 1/5th Royal Sussex to accompany each battalion. However, the attack was cancelled, and instead 1/5th Royal Sussex were set to help 29th Division's pioneers dig a new front line trench in No man's land, 350 yards (320 m) in front of the existing British front line and only 125–150 yards (114–137 m) from the German line; this was completed under heavy fire by 15 July.

During the Battle of Bazentin Ridge 48th (SM) Division was ordered to follow up 32nd Division's attack at Ovillers on 15 July. While B Company and half of C Company dug communication trenches at Crucifix Corner (including a tunnel that ended only 7 yards (6.4 m) from the German front line), the rest of the battalion paraded with tools to consolidate gains made by 143rd (Warwickshire) Bde on Usna Hill. The division pushed forward over succeeding days and attacked again during the Battle of Pozières on 23 July, while the 1/5th Bn worked on communication trenches. The division was relieved on 28 July and the battalion went by bus to rest in Domqueur.

After rest 1/5th Royal Sussex received training in bridging techniques and then went to work on trenches and dugouts at Ovillers ahead of the arrival of the rest of the division on 12 August. The Battle of Pozières was still raging when the division took over the captured 'Skyline Trench'. Here it was heavily attacked and lost part of the trench, but recaptured it on 14/15 August. The shell-battered trench was difficult to consolidate, and the line consisted of a succession of posts. 1/5th Royal Sussex suffered severely from shelling while digging communication trenches. It supplied Lewis gun teams to cover 144th (Gloucester & Worcester) Bde's attack on 21 August, dealing effectively with a counterattack. The division attacked again on 27 August. It was finally relieved next day, in mud and rain, and after rest 1/5th Bn's pioneers worked on tramways and light railways behind the lines. 48th (SM) Division had been transferred north to the Ancre sector, where 1/5th Bn rejoined it on 30 September.

==== Péronne ====
Low level fighting continued on the Ancre heights through the winter. 5th Royal Sussex (Note: The '1/' prefix became redundant after 1 September when the 2/5th and 3/5th Bns had disappeared.) constructed tracks and hutted camps – including its own 'Cinque Ports Camp' at Bazentin-le-Grand Wood. On 28 January 1917 the battalion moved by train with 144th Bde to relieve French troops at Cerisy-sur-Somme in front of Péronne. It worked on duckboarding communication trenches and maintaining observation posts (OPs) and signal lines. On 14 March the Germans began their retreat to the Hindenburg Line (Operation Alberich) and the divisional engineers had to bridge the River Somme before it could occupy Péronne while the pioneers worked on billets and advancing the roads and light railway towards the new front line.

48th (SM) Division was relieved on 3 May, but the pioneers remained working in the front line until 11 May when they went back to Péronne. The divisional scouts were relieved on 7 May after three months' continuous work in the division's OPs. At the end of the month 5th Royal Sussex moved out to garrison the division's reserve line on the Cambrai road. At the end of the month it was rejoined by two officers and 87 ORs who had been doing duty with III Corps' light railway companies, bringing it almost back to full strength (39 officers and 10140 ORs). On the night of 7/ June No 1 Platoon quickly consolidated an enemy post captured by the 1/1st Buckinghamshire Battalion, completing the task before dawn, and next day completed the work left unfinished by the infantry. 5th Royal Sussex spent the rest of the month completing the defences in front of the Hindenburg Line.

==== Ypres ====
The battalion was relieved on 3 July as 48th (SM) Division moved north to join XVIII Corps in the Ypres Salient, where Fifth Army was preparing for the Third Ypres Offensive. The pioneers worked on light railways and in the Canal Bank sector, with the battalion having about 100 men sent to hospital with gas poisoning. 48th (SM) Division was not engaged in the first phase of the offensive (the Battle of Pilckem Ridge) on 31 July, but D Company of 5th Royal Sussex worked to open up 'Boundary Road' and 'Buffs Road' to allow the heavy artillery to move up. The division moved into the front line on 6 August to attack on 16 August on the resumption of the offensive (the Battle of Langemarck). The attacking brigade had hard fighting to capture a strongpoint in St Juien, and only got about 200 yards (180 m) beyond the Steenbee stream. Five platoons of 5th Royal Sussex had been sent up under Capt Langham to consolidate captured strongpoints but could do little, and Langham (the CO's son) was along those killed. The strongpoints were captured next day with the assistance of tanks, and the battalion spent the rest of the month on consolidation, after which it returned to work on Buffs Road. (Note: Capt C.R. Langham of the divisional scouts is buried in Vlamertinghe New Military Cemetery.)

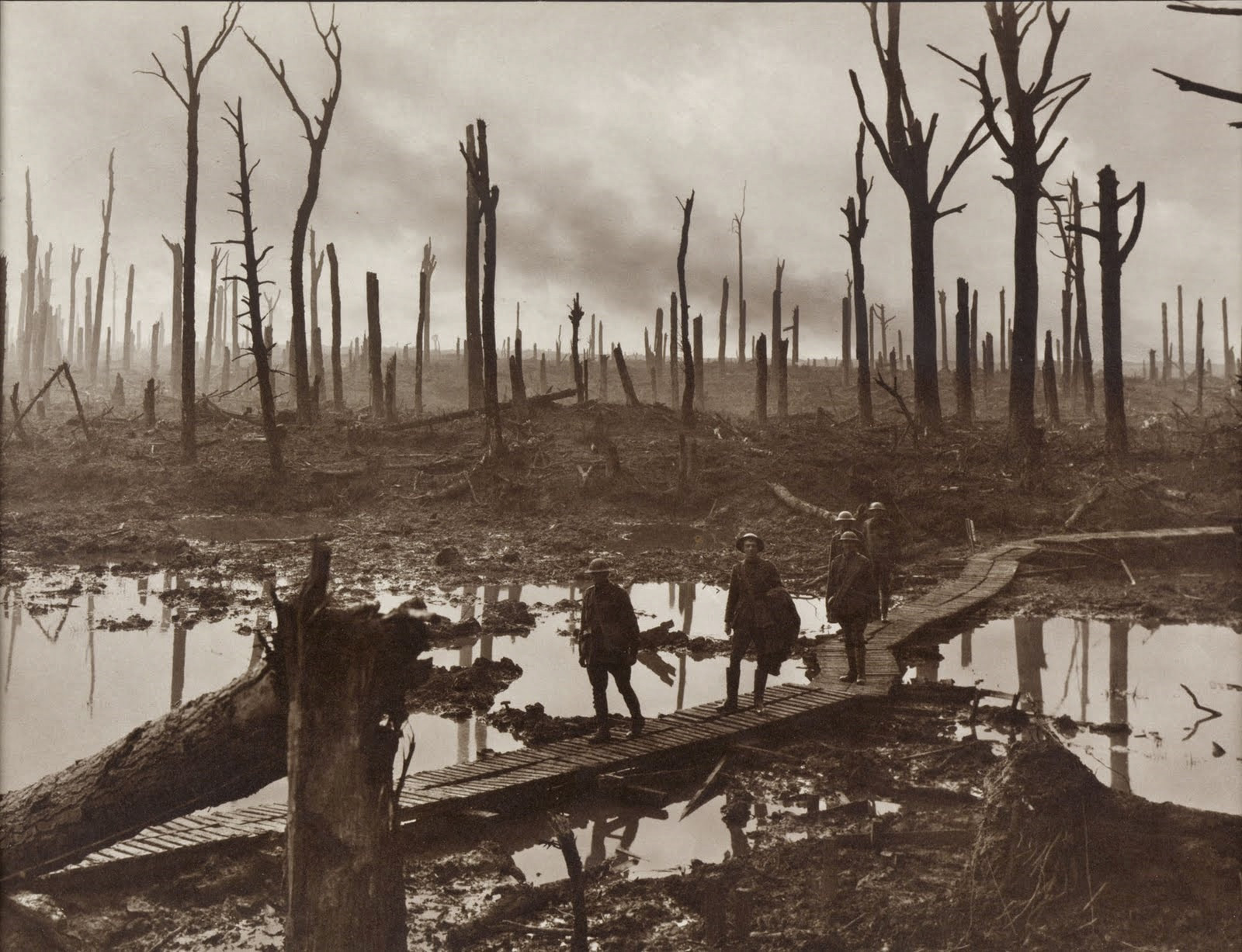
One of the Ypres Salient's notorious duckboard tracks, October 1917.

During September the battalion continued working on the roads, which were collapsing under the effects of the bad weather continuous fighting, and worked on one of the battlefield's notorious duckboard tracks. Casualties, particularly among C Company, were serious – on 12 October the battalion lost 4 ORs killed, 18 wounded, 47 horses killed and 18 wounded by one shell landing at 'Siege Camp'. Meanwhile, the infantry of 48th (SM) Division had been fighting the Battles of Broodseinde (4 October) and Poelcappelle (9 October). 5th Royal Sussex was finally relieved from its duties on 7 November and moved south to the Vimy area.

==== Italy ====
On 10 November 1917 the 48th (SM) Division received orders to move to the Italian Front, where the Central Powers forces were threatening to break through after the Battle of Caporetto, and on 29 November 5th Royal Sussex detrained at Legnago on the Adige. It was then constantly on the move until 11 December when it reached Schiavon. By now the situation had been stabilised, so the division did not immediately go into the line, and 5th Royal Sussex spent December in training round Rubbio. In January 1918 it was digging cable trenches and building camps around Marostica and the Valle San Floriana. On 17 January Lt-Col Langham was evacuated to hospital and Maj G. F. Eberle of the Royal Engineers took command, later being promoted to Lt-Col. At the end of the month it marched to Treviso and entrained for the GHQ training area round Trebaseleghe. Later detachments moved out to 5th Division's are to work on OPs for the heavy artillery, then moved to work in 7th Division's area. On 1 March the rest of 48th (SM) Division arrived to relieve 7th Division in the front line of the Montello sector on the Piave Front, and held the line until 16 March. On 1 April it moved westward into reserve for the middle sector of the Asiago Plateau Front, where 5th Royal Sussex moved into 23rd Division's area to work on mountain roads before 48th (SM) Division took over the front on 23 April. The three British divisions then alternated in the line during the Spring.

On 15 June the Austro-Hungarian Army made what proved to be its last attack, known to the British participants as the Battle of Asiago. The 48th (SM) Division had been particularly hard-hit by the influenza epidemic (referred to as 'Mountain Fever' by the Royal Sussex), and its units came under heavy pressure before the positions were regained in a counter-attack. 5th Royal Sussex spent the day 'standing-to' in the Red Line until some fire, but was not required. After the battle it returned to erecting barbed wire and preparing heavy artillery positions and working under 7th and 23rd Divisions until mid-July.

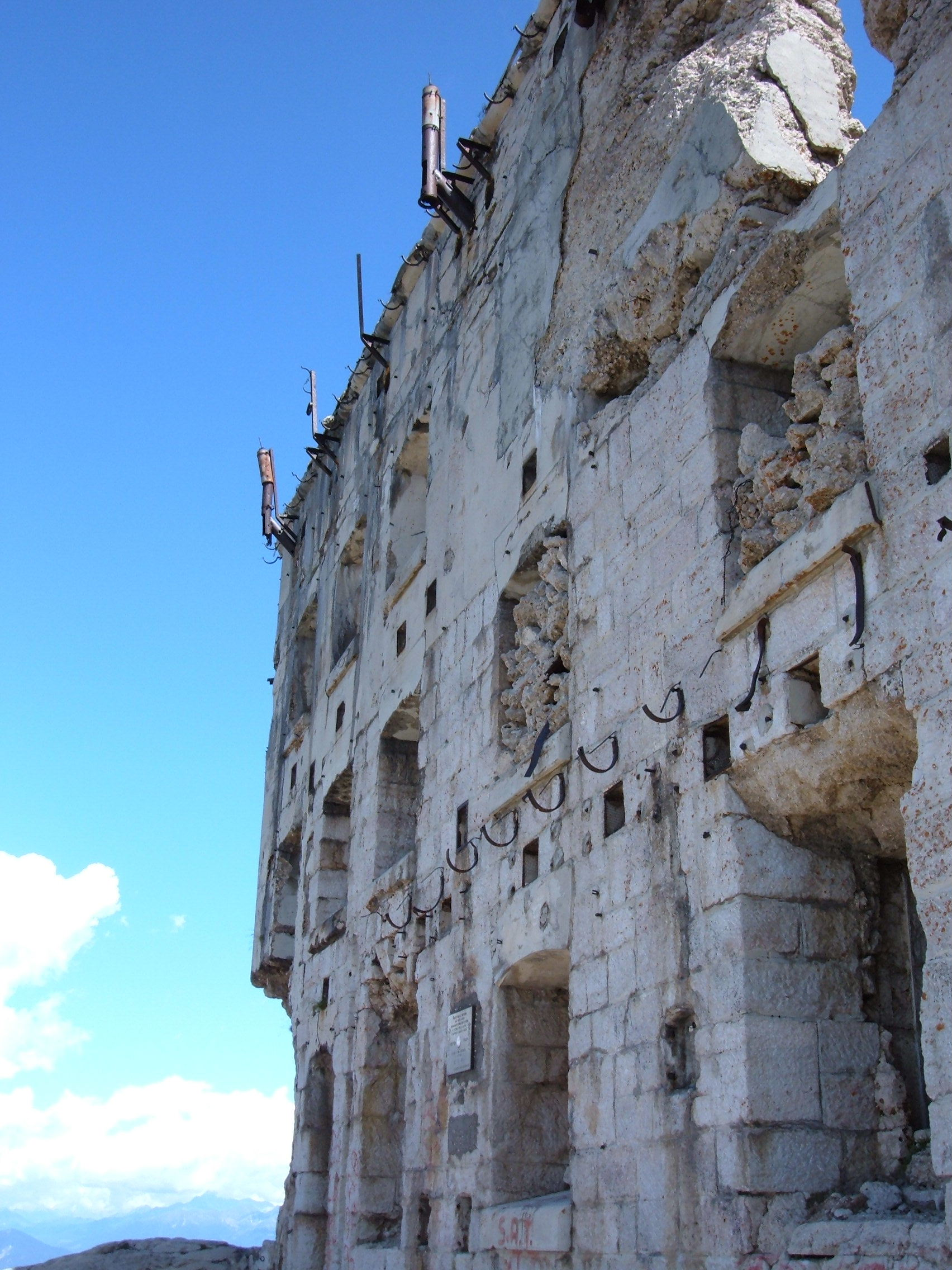
Fort Vezzena, captured by 5th Royal Sussex, 3 November 1918.

On 23 July the battalion arrived at Granezza, near Asiago, where it worked on excavating dugouts and gun positions, establishing water points, and road repair in the forward area, hampered by the constant need to 'stand to' in the alarm posts and night time shelling by the enemy. At the end of August a detachment of 6 officers and 80 Ors was specially trained as guides for the forthcoming Allied offensive. This offensive, the Battle of Vittorio Veneto, was launched on 24 October. Defeated on the Piave, the Austrians abandoned their positions on the Asiago Plateau on 29/30 October, and the 48th (SM) Division began a pursuit. 5th Royal Sussex sent forward special working parties that night to work on the roads leading from the British front line to Asiago, and this work was continued by relays of working parties. 48th (SM) Division attacked the Austrian Winterstellung (Winter position) on the morning of 1 November, and after breaking through it continued the pursuit down the gorge of the Val d'Assa. The pioneers repaired the road behind the advance, and provided patrols to deal with Austrian prisoners who had not yet been disarmed. C Company secured Fort Vezzena with only a few stray rifle shots fired.

By 15:00 on 4 November, when the Armistice of Villa Giusti came into force, the division had pushed forward into the Trentino. After the conclusion of hostilities 5th Royal Sussex was engaged in clearing the battlefields, then the division was withdrawn to Italy for the winter. 5th Royal Sussex was billeted in Costa di Rovigo, assisting in repairing flood damage in January 1919. Demobilisation of 48th (SM) Division began in 1919 and was complete by 31 March. The cadre of the battalion returned to the UK in 1919 and was disembodied on 12 May.

=== 2/5th and 3/5th (Cinque Ports) Battalions ===
The 2/5th Battalion was formed at Hastings on 16 November 1914 and the 3/5th on 26 June 1915. The 2nd Home Counties Division had no requirement for the 2/5th Bn. On 7 September 1915 the 3/5th absorbed the 2/5th and six days later was itself redesignated as the 2/5th Bn. The combined battalion continued to provide reinforcement drafts for the 1/5th Bn on the Western Front. On 8 April 1916 it was redesignated the 5th (Reserve) Bn, and on 1 September it was absorbed into the 4th (Reserve) Bn at Horsham.

After the 3rd Line TF battalions were formed in May 1915 the remaining Home Service and unfit men were separated to form brigades of Coast Defence Battalions (termed Provisional Battalions from June 1915). The men from the 4th and 5th Royal Sussex were formed into 72nd Provisional Battalion. The Military Service Act 1916 swept away the Home/Foreign service distinction, and all TF soldiers became liable for overseas service, if medically fit. Part of these units' role was now physical conditioning to render men fit for drafting overseas. The Provisional Brigades thus became anomalous, and on 1 January 1917 the remaining battalions became numbered battalions of their parent units. 72nd Provisional Bn had disappeared, probably absorbed into 70th Provisional Bn originally formed from the men of 5th and 6th Bns, East Surrey Regiment, which became 15th Battalion, Royal Sussex. 70th Provisional Bn had been at Burnham-on-Sea as part of 8th Provisional Bde when that brigade was expanded into 72nd Division in November 1916. The battalion joined 215th Bde. The division moved from Somerset to Eastern England, and 15th Sussex was stationed at Bedford by January 1917 and Ipswich by May. Early in 1918, 72nd Division began to be broken up: 15th Sussex moved to Cambridge where it was disbanded (sources give dates between 28 March and 19 August 1918).

== Interwar ==
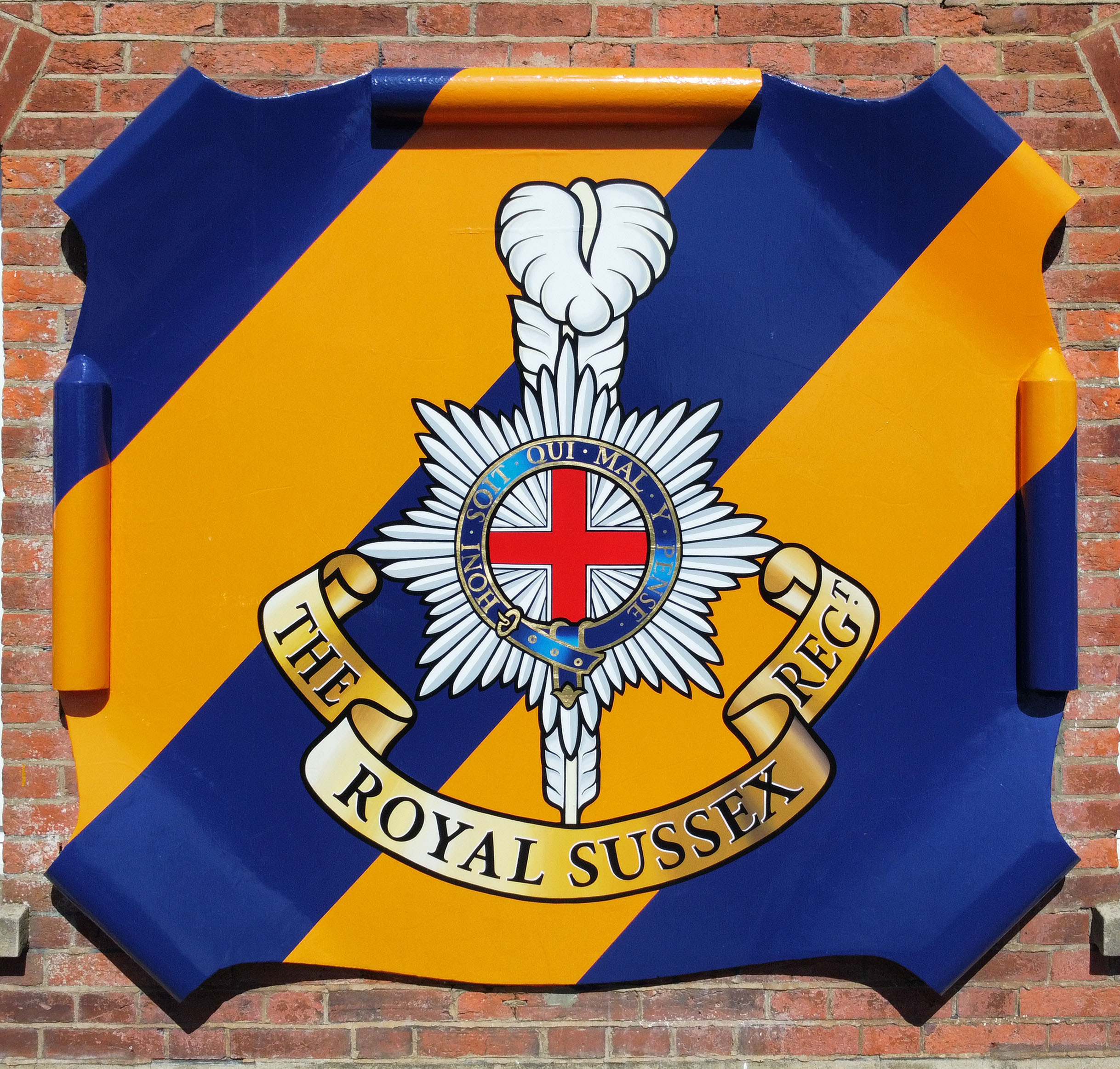
Royal Sussex Regiment emblem on the drill hall at Bexhill-on-Sea.

The TF was reconstituted on 7 February 1920 and the 5th (Cinque Ports) Battalion was reformed at Hastings. The following year the TF was reorganised as the Territorial Army (TA). The battalion was now in 133rd (Kent and Sussex) Brigade in the TA's 44th (Home Counties) Division.

In the 1920s the Temple Grove School and Mayfield College cadet corps were affiliated to the battalion. The Middle Street Drill Hall was sold in 1933 and later demolished. By the outbreak of the Second World War, the battalion's drill hall was at Bulverhythe, a suburb of Hastings.

After the Munich Crisis the TA was rapidly doubled in size, with most units forming duplicates. This time the duplicate of the 5th Bn, formed at Hastings on 20 July 1939, was designated 7th (Cinque Ports) Battalion, Royal Sussex. (There had been a previous 7th (Service) Battalion, Royal Sussex Regiment, in 1914–19; this was a Kitchener's Army unit that served in the original 12th (Eastern) Division.)

== Second World War ==
=== Mobilisation ===
The TA was mobilised on 1 September 1939. and when war was declared on 3 September the 44th (Home Counties) Division was in the process of organising its duplicate formation, the 12th (Eastern) Division: 7th Royal Sussex was assigned to 37th Brigade, the duplicate of 133rd. The two formations began their separate existence on 7 October 1939.

=== 5th (Cinque Ports) Battalion ===
The battalion was initially employed guarding vulnerable points in Sussex. It then moved to Dorset to carry out training for deployment overseas. The HQ Wing seems to have been sent to Cattistock, with the other companies at Toller, Melbury and Evershot. On 7 October 133rd Bde re-assembled, and on 20 December the 4th and 5th Bns Royal Sussex were joined in the brigade by the regular 2nd Bn.

==== Battle of France ====
On 3 April 1940, the battalion left Cattistock for Southampton and was then shipped to Cherbourg Naval Base on the night of the 8/9 April on board SS Amsterdam. The battalion's embarkation strength was 29 officers and 690 ORs. During the night of 9/10 April the battalion was moved on to Vivoin, and did some final training. It then moved to Belleuse, and then after two days marched to St. Pol, with the HQ being set up at Conteville, Somme, with the other companies at Eps, Pas-de-Calais and Hestrus.

When the German offensive in the west opened on 10 May, the BEF advanced into Belgium to the River Dyle in accordance with 'Plan D'. 44th (HC) Division moved up to the River Escaut in reserve. On 11 May the 5th Sussex went to Lillers to perform Line of Communication (LoC) guard duties. It then moved on to Vichtrat Peteghem (Belgium) by motor transport to take up defensive duties. After arrival they were told to march back 17 miles into France, then after marching all night were ordered to turn round again and head straight back to where they had come from, so marched 35 miles in 24 hours. The German Army having broken through the Ardennes to the east, forcing the BEF to withdraw again, the whole force was now back across the Escaut. On 20 May the 5th Sussex went to Wortegem to take up defensive positions covering the Escaut, with trenches on the forward slopes.

Combat for 5th Bn began on 20 May when it came under shell and mortar fire. 44th (HC) Division was holding the most dangerous sector of the line, and despite its efforts the Germans established bridgeheads across the Escaut at dawn. That night the Germans had reached Petegem a mile across the river: an early-morning counter-attack by 131st Bde (1/5th and 1/6th Queen's and 2nd Buffs) cleared them out. But the following afternoon the enemy returned to the attack and 131st Bde was driven back; soon the Queen's could only raise a single composite company to join 5th Sussex in preventing further penetration. The attack was renewed on 22 May and there was bitter fighting on 44th (HC) Division's front. Although it was badly chewed up, there had been no breakthrough: it was the deep penetration further east that forced the BEF to withdraw. 5th Sussex retreated to Courtrai, and then next day to the hospital for incurables at St Andre (near Lille), where 160 casualties were reported. Here the BEF was defending the 'Canal Line', with 44th (HC) Division in GHQ reserve.

On 24 May the battalion was sent to Vieux-Berquin, and next day to Strazeele where it encountered German tanks and took heavy fire. On the 25/26 the battalion moved on to Rouge Croix, taking a defensive position where 44th (HC) Division was covering Hazebrouck. On 26 May the decision was made to evacuate the BEF through Dunkirk (Operation Dynamo). Next day the battalion came under heavy fire from dive bombers and shells as 44th (HC) Division was attacked by German Panzer divisions. The division fought on doggedly until ordered to withdraw, by which time the enemy's advanced columns had penetrated between its widely-spread units. With its flanks 'in the air' after neighbouring French formations retreated during the night of 28/29 May, the divisional commander decided to withdraw while a rearguard of divisional artillery and engineers held Mont des Cats. The 5th Sussex retreated via Poperinghe, to Bray Dunes from where they were eventually evacuated, landing in England on 1 June.

==== Home defence ====
On return to England 44th (HC) Division rejoined Southern Command, but before the end of June went to I Corps in Northern Command while reorganisation and re-equipment continued. In November 1940 44th (HC) Division was transferred to XII Corps in invasion-threatened South East England where it remained until early April 1942. Once the imminent danger of invasion had passed, training for offensive action began. For much of this training period 44th (HC) Division was commanded by Maj-Gen Brian Horrocks, in South-Eastern Command under Lt-Gen Bernard Montgomery, the two commanders under whom it would fight in the desert.

44th (HC) Division came under War Office control on 3 April 1942, preparatory to overseas service, and on 29 May 1942 it embarked for Egypt, via Freetown, Cape Town and Aden.

==== Alam el Halfa ====
The division arrived at Suez in Egypt on 24 July, shortly after Eighth Army had retreated to the El Alamein position. At first it was in the Nile Delta defences in the rear, then on 14 August the division was called forward by Gen Montgomery and the following day assigned to XIII Corps under Lt-Gen Horrocks. The division was positioned with 133rd Bde on the vital Alam Halfa ridge, where Gen Rommel was expected to attack the El Alamein line, and its positions were protected by minefields and artillery, with armour on its flanks to counter-attack. When the attack came in on 30 August (the Battle of Alam el Halfa), the Panzers spent hours attempting to break through in the darkness and early morning. Over the next two days the Panzers made repeated attacks but 44th (HC) Division held its position and the Panzers suffered heavy casualties. By 3 September the division was counter-attacking.

After Alam Halfa, 133rd Bde with 5th Sussex was detached from 44th (HC) Division on 8 September and joined first 8th Armoured Division briefly, and then, from 29 September, 10th Armoured Division, which was lacking a Lorried Infantry Brigade. Shortage of equipment meant that the conversion to 'lorried infantry' was only just completed in time for the Second Battle of El Alamein.

==== Alamein ====
This battle was launched with Operation Lightfoot on the night of 23/24 October. 10th Armoured Division lay up some 13–16 miles behind the starting line until after dark, when it advanced to the 'Springbok Track' and topped up with fuel. After the infantry divisions had advanced, it was the turn of the armoured divisions to pass through gaps made by the sappers in the enemy's minefields. 10th Armoured Division started promptly at 02.00 and its armour reached the Miteirya Ridge (the objective codenamed 'Oxalic') but could not get beyond that to its second objective ('Pierson'). 133rd Lorried Bde had still not left Springbok by dawn. The following night, the division prepared to advance from 'Oxalic' to 'Pierson', with 133rd Bde acting as a pivot on Miteirya Ridge. Mines, air attacks and enemy gunfire slowed the advance from the congested minefield gaps.

'Lightfoot' had failed to break through: there followed what Montgomery termed the 'Dogfight' part of the battle. On 27 October, 1st Armoured Division failed again to break through, and the corps commander sent 133rd Bde up to reinforce 1st Armoured's 7th Motor Brigade holding the 'Snipe' and 'Woodcock' positions. Ground reconnaissance was impossible in daylight, and 133rd Bde HQ could not locate 7th Motor Bde's positions; after dark it was found that neither 'Snipe' nor 'Woodcock' was in British hands. 133rd Brigade therefore set off to capture them, with only a simple artillery fireplan in view of the confused situation. The attack was launched at 22.30; 4th Royal Sussex had its reserve company destroyed trying deal with heavy fire from the left. The rest of the battalion dug in, but at dawn was found to be isolated and was overrun by the enemy.

The second phase of the offensive, Operation Supercharge, was launched on the night of 1/2 November. 133rd Bde attacked alongside the New Zealand 28th Maori Battalion, securing objectives that covered the flanks of the main attack. On 2 November, 5th (Cinque Ports) Bn with strong artillery support put in a successful attack on 'Snipe' as the Axis defences began to crumble. 133rd Brigade advanced through the 'February' minefield on 3 November, but got held up on the 'Avon' minefield until 5 November. However, by now the enemy was withdrawing. After the battle 133rd Bde was left behind to collect prisoners while Eighth Army pursued the beaten enemy westwards.

=== 4th/5th (Cinque Ports) Battalion ===
133rd Bde was broken up on 31 December 1942, and on New Year's Day 1943 and 5th (Cinque Ports) Bn was combined with the survivors of 4th Royal Sussex as a single unit: 4th/5th (Cinque Ports) Battalion. This became a permanent amalgamation. The battalion was sent from Egypt to Iraq, and on arrival on 1 February it came under the command of 27th Indian Infantry Brigade in 6th Indian Division. This formed part of Tenth Army, protecting the vital oilfields and lines of communication to the Soviet Union.

The battalion spent the rest of the war moving around Middle East Command: it arrived in Persia on 17 April 1943, returning to Iraq on 26 September. It then moved to Palestine on 28 March 1944, back to Persia on 24 May, and finally returned to Iraq on 16 April 1945.

After the war the battalion passed into suspended animation on 15 June 1946.

=== 7th (Cinque Ports) Battalion ===
During the Phoney War the 12th (E) Division was in Eastern Command, training and undertaking coast defence duties. However, the BEF required additional labour units, and the partly-trained infantry battalions (without the divisional artillery, etc) were sent to France, joining the BEF Lines of Communication (LoC) on 22 April 1940. The men were employed in building bases, airfields, raids and railways.

==== Battle of France ====
On 17 May the threat to the BEF's LoC was obvious, and the 2nd Line TA divisions working on labour projects were concentrated for possible action, 12th (E) Division gathering around Amiens. 37th Brigade, with only the 6th and 7th Sussex present, arrived at Amiens by train and was caught by a Luftwaffebombing raid that destroyed one of the trains. The troops were extricated and the two battalions moved out south of Amiens, with little more than their rifles to halt the German Panzers. On 20 May the 1st Panzer Division broke through at Albert and drove on to Amiens. Here the 7th (Cinque Ports) Battalion fought to a finish and was destroyed.

==== Home Defence ====
12th (Eastern) Division had been effectively destroyed during the Battle of France, and was not reformed after the survivors were evacuated. However, the 7th (Cinque Ports) Battalion was rebuilt, in what was now 37th (Independent) Brigade, operating directly under II Corps in Norfolk. In February 1941 the brigade transferred to XI Corps, but it was still guarding the Norfolk coast.

At the end of 1941 the battalion was selected to be retrained in the light anti-aircraft (LAA) role equipped with Bofors 40 mm guns. It left 37th Bde on 19 November, and on 1 January 1942 it transferred to the Royal Artillery (RA) as 109th (Royal Sussex) LAA Regiment, comprising Regimental Headquarters (RHQ) and 357, 358 and 339 LAA Batteries.

=== 109th (Royal Sussex) Light Anti-Aircraft Regiment ===
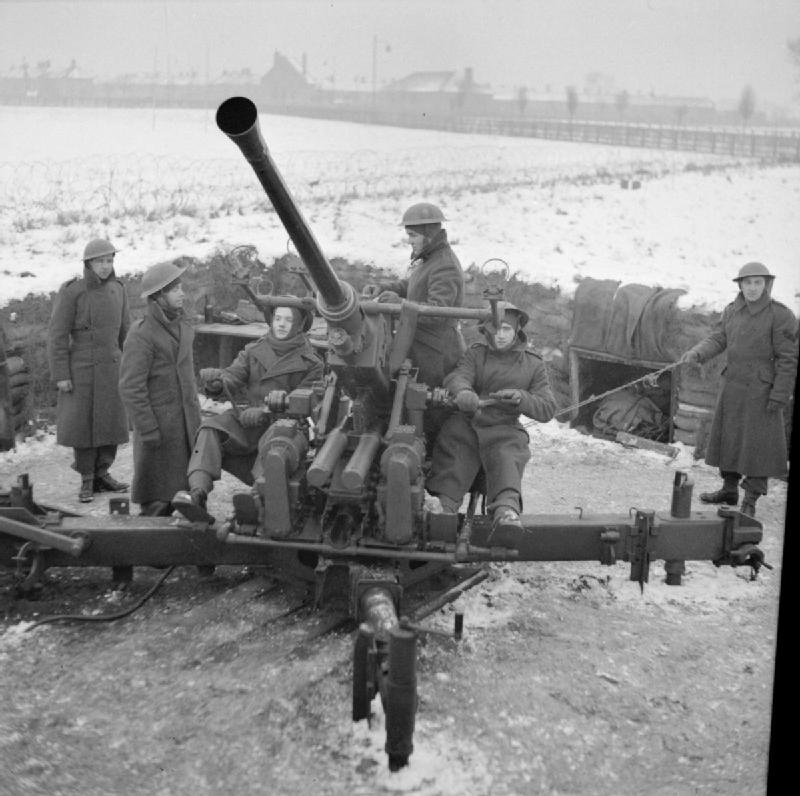
A Bofors 40 mm LAA gun crew under training, January 1942.

The new regiment was originally part of Anti-Aircraft Command, but left in February before it was allocated to a brigade. Instead it joined the field force as the AA regiment in I Corps District.

By early 1943 the regiment was in GHQ Reserve, organised as a mobile unit:

- RHQ
- 357, 358, 359 LAA Btys
- 109 LAA Rgt Signal Section, Royal Corps of Signals
- 1561 LAA Rgt Platoon, Royal Army Service Corps
- 109 LAA Rgt Workshop Section, Royal Electrical and Mechanical Engineers

By the summer of 1943 the regiment had been assigned to 21st Army Group training for the planned Allied invasion of Normandy (Operation Overlord).

==== North West Europe ====
Operation Overlord was launched on D Day, 6 June 1944. 109th LAA Regiment formed part of 106 AA Bde, which began arriving in Normandy on D + 4. It had been intended that the brigade would be deployed to protect 12 airfields, but because the beachhead was still so shallow the usable airfields were well within the cover of the existing AA defences. Eventually, eight airfields were active, four having one Heavy AA (HAA) battery and two LAA Troops, the others having two LAA troops only. The deployment was frustrating for the units, not only because there were surplus guns, but because Royal Air Force airfield commanders refused all permission to fire unless the places were actually being attacked.

With the breakout from the Normandy beachhead in late August, 106th AA Bde was freed from its commitments to RAF airfields. While the rest of the brigade followed 21st Army Group's advance, 109th LAA Rgt was sent to Cherbourg Naval Base to reinforce 101 AA Bde, deployed to protect the port under US command. The regiment arrived on 25 August and remained there when 5 Royal Marines AA Bde took over on 4 September.

The British AA cover for Cherbourg was finally withdrawn on 5 October and on 19 October the regiment arrived at Mook Bridge on the River Maas, which had been captured during Operation Market Garden and was an important link in XXX Corps' supply lines. At Mook the regiment relieved 71st LAA Rgt and came under command of 106 AA Bde once more. It continued with 106 AA Bde protecting river and canal crossings in XXX Corps' area through the winter months. and remained with XXX Corps during the operations in the Reichswald in February 1945 (Operation Veritable). For this operation it moved up to the assembly area on the night of 4/5 February giving cover for the medium and heavy guns of 9th Army Group Royal Artillery.

106th AA Brigade was freed of its bridge defence commitments in March in order to support XXX Corps for Operation Plunder, the assault crossing of the Rhine. Together with 71st LAA, the regiment had to deal with Fighter-bomber attacks in the Uden–Weeze triangle where XXX Corps' major communication centres, artillery lines and dumps of engineering equipment. The regiments replied to these day and night attacks with high-power concentrations of fire and radar-controlled barrages. They also had to cope with a few 'snap' attacks by single aircraft at low level.

Immediately after the Rhine crossing had been launched on the night of 23/24 March, 71st and 109th LAA moved up to cover the bridging operations. Scattered attacks by the Luftwaffe began after nightfall on 24/25 March. 106th AA Brigade reported 20+ Junkers Ju 88s operating that night, often in medium- and low-level divebombing attacks. Some were illuminated by the searchlights (SLs) and were engaged by 109th and 71st LAA Rgts, with 343rd LAA Bty claiming two destroyed. The following night the attacks were repeated by 30+ JU 88s at medium height, some of the attacks directed against the SLs supporting the crossings. The AA S/Ls were effective at picking up the attackers and a number were destroyed by the guns, while others were forced to take evasive action. The next night saw a similar level of activity, but thereafter 21st Army Group's advance pushed deeper into Germany and the last significant Luftwaffe activity over the Rhine was on the night of 27/28 March.

The regiment was transferred to 100 AA Bde for the crossing of the Weser, followed by the crossing of the Elbe (Operation Enterprise) on 29 April, with 109th covering field gun and marshalling areas under the Commander, RA, of VIII Corps. This led to a hot AA battle against last-ditch efforts by the Luftwaffe, 100 AA Bde engaging about 60 Messerschmitt Bf 109 and Focke-Wulf Fw 190 single-engined fighters delivering bomb and machine gun attacks. Although the AA fire deterred many of the attacks, one bridge was briefly put out of action on 1 May, which did not prevent 21st Army Group breaking out of its bridgeheads and driving towards Hamburg.

As Germany collapsed, the AA guns were ordered to cease fire on 4 May, and hostilities ended with the German surrender at Lüneburg Heath on 7 May. Postwar, 100 AA Bde was employed as occupation troops in Hamburg.

109th (Royal Sussex) LAA Rgt began entering 'suspended animation' in British Army of the Rhine on 23 February 1946, and completed the process by 9 March.

== Postwar ==
After the TA was reconstituted on 1 January 1947, the 4th/5th (Cinque Ports) Bn, Royal Sussex, was reformed as a single unit at Worthing and the 5th Bn did not regain its independence. 109th (Royal Sussex) LAA Rgt was disbanded.

The TA was reduced into the Territorial and Army Volunteer Reserve (TAVR) on 1 April 1967, when the 4th/5th (Cinque Ports) Bn was broken up to form two subunits, one of which was C (Cinque Ports) Company in 5th (Volunteer) Bn, Queen's Regiment, at St Leonards-on-Sea, Hastings.

The TAVR was reduced further on 1 April 1969, the TAVR III elements being reduced to cadres: 9th Queen's became a cadre under 5th Queen's, with some personnel at Eastbourne forming a platoon of C (Cinque Ports) Company. (Another platoon was formed in Sussex in June 1970, at Crawley, from elements of 8th (West Kent) Bn, Queen's.)

This company continued until 1 July 1999 when the 5th (V) Bn was merged into 3rd (V) Bn Princess of Wales's Royal Regiment and the Cinque Ports company at Hastings was disbanded.

== Heritage and ceremonial ==
=== Honorary Colonels ===
The following served as Honorary Colonel of the unit:

- Granville Leveson-Gower, 2nd Earl Granville, KG, Lord Warden of the Cinque Ports, appointed (to 1st Admin Bn) 9 April 1866, died 31 March 1891
- Robert Gascoyne-Cecil, 3rd Marquess of Salisbury, KG, Lord Warden of the Cinque Ports, appointed 25 December 1895, died 22 August 1903
- George, Prince of Wales, appointed 4 October 1906; succeeded as King George V 6 May 1910
- William Lygon, 7th Earl Beauchamp, KG, Lord Warden of the Cinque Ports, appointed 3 January 1914
- Freeman Freeman-Thomas, 1st Marquess of Willingdon, Lord Warden of the Cinque Ports, appointed 18 July 1936, died 12 August 1941
- Winston Churchill, Lord Warden of the Cinque Ports, appointed 14 November 1941; continued with 4th/5th Bn

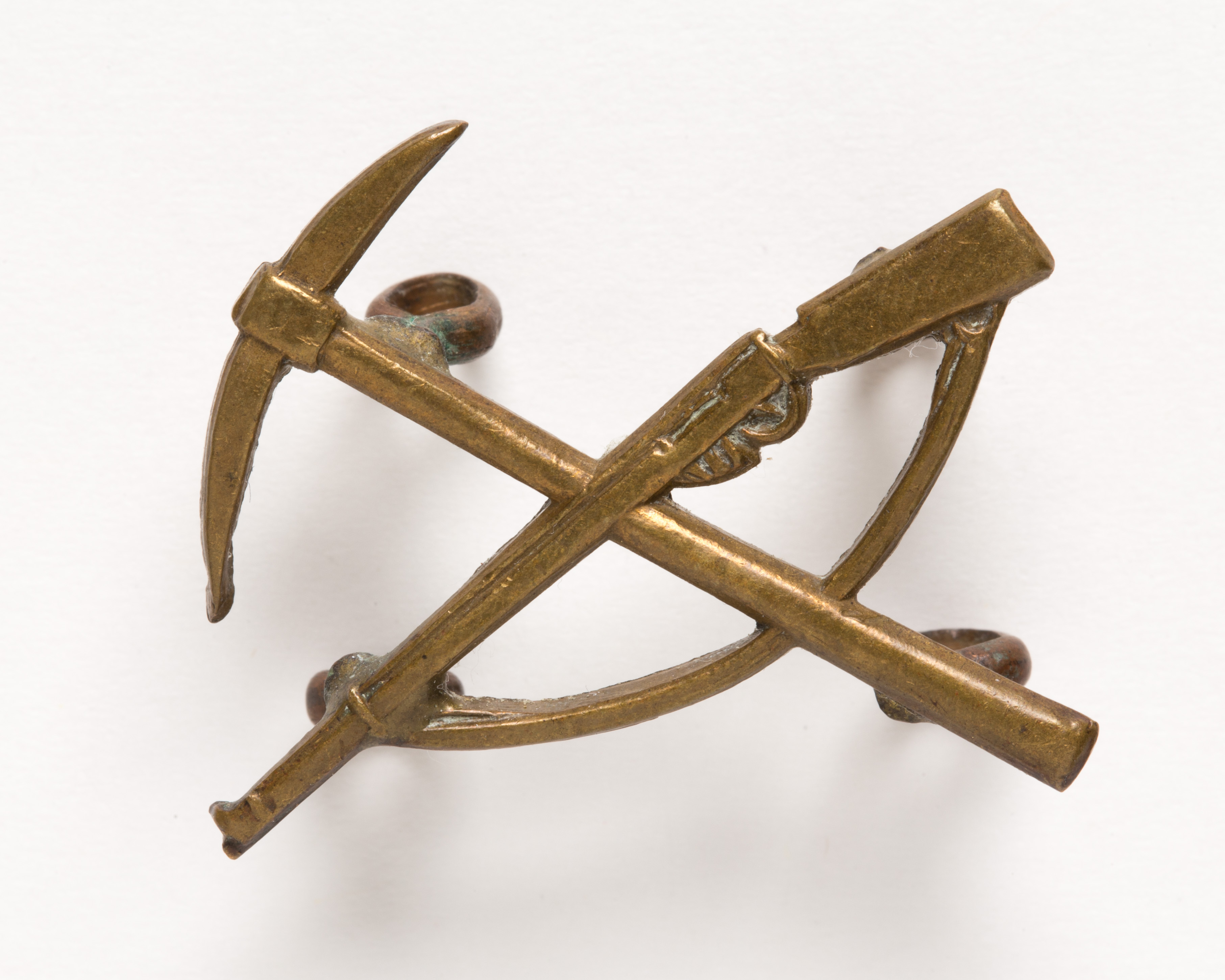
Pioneer's collar badge, First World War

=== Uniforms and insignia ===
When first formed, many of the RVCs adopted 'Volunteer' grey uniforms instead of the Regulars' scarlet. The 1st (Hastings) Cinque Ports RVC appears to have worn grey with red facings. Later the 1st Cinque Ports battalion wore grey with blue facings, only adopting the scarlet uniform with blue facings of the Royal Sussex in 1899. It was also allowed to bear the Coat of arms of the Cinque Ports on its appointments. As pioneers 1915–18, the men of 1/5th Bn wore a brass badge on each collar in the form of a crossed rifle and pick. As an established TA unit, the 7th Bn was allowed to retain its Royal Sussex cap badge and buttons when it transferred to the Royal Artillery in 1942.

=== Memorials ===
There is a brass plaque in St Peter's Church, Brighton, to the seven men of 1st VB, Royal Sussex, who died on service in the Second Boer War. The Royal Sussex Regiment's main Boer War memorial stands in Regency Square, Brighton; it lists 160 names, including the casualties of the Volunteer Service Companies

The Royal Sussex Regiment's Memorial Chapel (St George's Chapel) in Chichester Cathedral lists the regiment's First World War dead on a series of panels by battalion, with a memorial book for those of WWII. There are additional First World War memorials, to the men of the Cinque Ports at Lympne, Kent, and to the men of the Cinque Ports and the towns of Rye and Winchelsea at St Thomas the Martyr Church, Winchelsea. A memorial to E Company, 5th (Cinque Ports) Bn, originally in the Drill Hall at Rye, is now in the Ypres Tower Museum.

The memorial to the 7th (Cinque Ports) Bn and the men who died in the stand at Amiens in 1940 comprises a set of memorial gates in the Lady Chapel of St Nicholas of Myra Church in Brighton.
