= Michael Foster (Hastings and Rye MP) =

British lawyer and politician

Michael Jabez Foster

Parliamentary Secretary to the Government Equalities Office
- In office 9 June 2009 – 11 May 2010
- Prime Minister: Gordon Brown
- Preceded by: Maria Eagle
- Succeeded by: Lynne Featherstone (Under-Secretary of State)

Member of Parliament for Hastings and Rye
- In office 1 May 1997 – 12 April 2010
- Preceded by: Jacqui Lait
- Succeeded by: Amber Rudd

Personal details
- Born: 26 February 1946 (age 80) Hastings, Sussex, UK
- Party: Labour
- Spouse: Rosemary Kemp
- Education: University of Leicester
- Website: www.michaelfosterlaw.co.uk

Michael Jabez Foster (born 26 February 1946) is a British lawyer and Labour politician who served as the Member of Parliament (MP) for Hastings and Rye from 1997 to 2010, and served in government as a Minister for Equalities from 2009 to 2010.

== Early life ==
Michael Foster was born in Hastings, Sussex and attended the local Hastings Secondary School for Boys and the Hastings Grammar School before attending the University of Leicester where he received a Master of Laws (LLM) degree. Between 1963 and 1972 he worked as a litigation clerk; he was admitted as a solicitor in 1980 and later worked as a partner of Fynmores Solicitors in Bexhill-on-Sea specialising in employment law until 1998.

He was elected as a councillor to the Hastings Borough Council in 1970, becoming the Labour group leader for a year in 1973, serving on the council until 1977, he was again elected to the Borough Council 1981–1985. He received a dual mandate in 1974 when he was also elected as a councillor to the East Sussex County Council, becoming the deputy Labour group leader 1984–1992, he stood down from the county council in 1997.

== Parliamentary career ==
He unsuccessfully contested Hastings at both the February and October 1974 general elections and again at the 1979 General Election, and on each occasion was defeated by the sitting Conservative MP Kenneth Warren. He won Hastings and Rye at the 1997 General Election when he became the second least expected Labour MP in the landslide. He defeated the new sitting Conservative MP Jacqui Lait by 2,560 votes and remained the MP until 2010. He made his maiden speech on 21 November 1997.

In parliament he was a member of the social security select committee in 1998 until he became the parliamentary private secretary to the Attorney General Gareth Williams in 1999 and his successor Peter Goldsmith until the 2005 General Election. From 2005 he served as a member of the work and pensions and standards and privileges select committees.

In 2003, Foster has called for then-Home Secretary David Blunkett to deport a convicted murderer who was freed after serving 12 months of his 36-year sentence.

Foster later resigned as a PPS in 2003 over the Iraq War, which he regarded as being illegal without a mandate from the United Nations. He subsequently returned to Government.

In 2009, Foster was appointed Parliamentary Secretary for Equality in the Government Equalities Office, responsible for the progress of the Government's Equalities Bill through the House of Commons.

Foster lost his seat at the 2010 as part of the national swing to the Conservatives.

== Personal life ==
Foster married Rosemary Kemp on 13 September 1969 in Hastings and they have two sons. He is a member of the Christian Socialists and the Society of Labour Lawyers. Other interests include pensioners rights, child poverty and animal welfare. He is a deputy lieutenant of East Sussex, a position he has held since 1993, and was High Sheriff of East Sussex for 2016–17.

He currently runs his own law practice, specialising in employment law.

Parliament of the United Kingdom
Preceded by Jacqui Lait	Member of Parliament for Hastings and Rye; 1997 – 2010	Succeeded by Amber Rudd
