= Joseph Planta (politician) =

British politician

Joseph Planta GCH (2 July 1787 – 5 April 1847) was a British diplomat and politician of Romansh-Swiss descent. He was the member of parliament (MP) for Hastings, England.

Planta's father, also named Joseph Planta (1744–1827), moved from Switzerland to England and became the Principal Librarian of the British Museum in London. He was born at the British Museum and educated at Eton College.

Planta became a clerk at the Foreign Office and was Private Secretary to George Canning. In 1813–14, he was Secretary to Robert Stewart, Viscount Castlereagh, during his mission to the allied sovereigns. He was the Parliamentary Under-Secretary of State for Foreign Affairs from 25 July 1817 to 22 January 1822. He was also the Permanent Under-Secretary of State for Foreign Affairs from 1817.

He was the Senior Secretary to the Treasury during the Canningite Government of 1827–1828 and the Tory Government of 1828–1830. He was made a member of the Privy council in 1834. He was made a Lord of the Treasury on 21 November 1834 in the Conservative Provisional Government of 1834.

He was elected Conservative member of parliament for Hastings in southern England, in 1827 and 1830. He was defeated in 1835, but then re-elected in 1837, and again in 1841.

== Honours ==
He was knighted with the Grand Cross of the Hanoverian Guelphic Order (GCH).

Political offices
Preceded by Edward Cooke	Parliamentary Under-Secretary of State for Foreign Affairs; 1817–1822	Succeeded by Richard Meade
Preceded by William Richard Hamilton	Permanent Under-Secretary of State for Foreign Affairs; 1817–1827	Succeeded by John Backhouse
Preceded by Stephen Rumbold Lushington	Senior Secretary to the Treasury; 1827–1830	Succeeded by Edward Ellice
Parliament of the United Kingdom
Preceded by James Lushington	2nd Member of Parliament for Hastings; 1827–1831	Succeeded by Frederick North
Preceded by Howard Elphinstone	1st Member of Parliament for Hastings; 1837–1844	Succeeded by Musgrave Brisco
