= Kenneth Warren (politician) =

British politician (1926–2019)

Sir Kenneth Robin Warren CEng FRAeS FCILT (15 August 1926 – 29 June 2019) was a British Conservative Party politician.

He was educated at Aldenham School, Midsomer Norton Grammar School, King's College London and the London School of Economics. He served as Conservative Member of Parliament for Hastings from 1970 to 1983, and as Conservative Member of Parliament for Hastings and Rye from 1983 until he retired in 1992.

He lived in Cranbrook, Kent. His wife of 51 years, Anne, died in 2013. He died on 29 June 2019 at the age of 92.

Parliament of the United Kingdom
Preceded by Neill Cooper-Key	Member of Parliament for Hastings; 1970 – 1983	Constituency abolished
New constituency	Member of Parliament for Hastings and Rye; 1983 – 1992	Succeeded by Jacqui Lait
