= John Isted =

English cricketer

Personal information
- Full name: John Isted
- Batting: Unknown
- Bowling: Unknown

Domestic team information
- Years: Team
- 1853: Sussex

Career statistics
Competition	First-class
Matches	3
Runs scored	6
Batting average	1.50
100s/50s	–/–
Top score	4
Balls bowled	172
Wickets	5
Bowling average	16.25*
5 wickets in innings	–
10 wickets in match	–
Best bowling	3/50
Catches/stumpings	2/–
- Source: Cricinfo, 15 December 2011

John Isted (dates of birth and death unknown) was an English cricketer. Isted's batting and bowling style is unknown. It's not known where or when he was born, but it is known he was christened at Lindfield, Sussex on 9 December 1810.

Isted made two first-class appearances for Sussex, both against Nottinghamshire in 1853 at the Royal Brunswick Ground, Hove and Trent Bridge. He also made a single first-class appearance for the Gentlemen of England in that season against the United All-England Eleven at the Royal Brunswick Ground. He took a total of 5 wickets in his three first-class matches, which came at an approximate average of 16.25. The average is approximate because of incomplete statistics on how many runs he conceded as a bowler, with him having conceded at least 65 runs. His best bowling figures were 3/50.
