= Richard Bannok =

English politician

Richard Bannok (fl. 1381–1391) was an English politician. He sat as MP for Hastings in 1381, September 1388 and 1391.

He witnessed a deed at Hastings in 1382.
