= Iden, East Sussex =

Village in East Sussex, England

Coordinates: 50.98°N 0.73°E

Iden
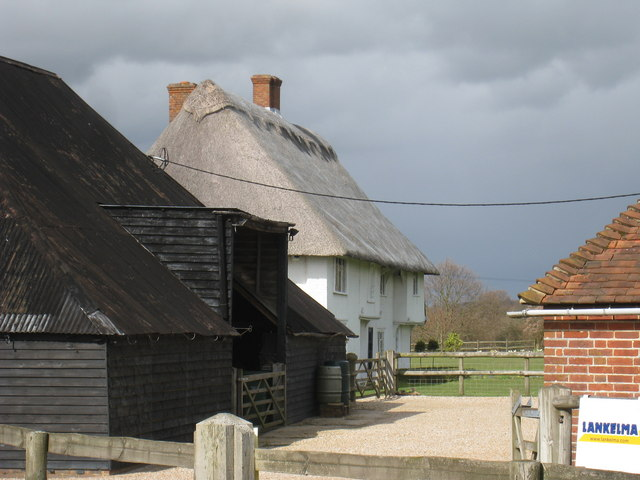

- Location within East Sussex
- Area: 12.0 km^{2} (4.6 sq mi)
- Population: 456 (Parish-2011)
  - Density: 98/sq mi (38/km^{2})
- OS grid reference: TQ918238
  - London: 51 miles (82 km) NW
- Civil parish: Iden
- District: Rother
- Shire county: East Sussex
- Region: South East
- Country: England
- Sovereign state: United Kingdom
- Post town: RYE
- Postcode district: TN31
- Dialling code: 01797
- Police: Sussex
- Fire: East Sussex
- Ambulance: South East Coast
- UK Parliament: Hastings and Rye

Iden is a village and civil parish in the Rother district of East Sussex, England. The village is located two miles (3.2 km) north of Rye.

Iden 12th/13th century parish church is dedicated to All Saints. Iden is also a Domesday Village, and listed in the Domesday Book.
