= Thomas Lake (Portage County, Wisconsin) =

Lake in the state of Wisconsin, United States

- Location within Wisconsin Location within the United States
- Location: Portage County, Wisconsin
- Coordinates: 44°28′25″N 89°23′25″W
- Surface elevation: 1,106 feet (337 m)

Thomas Lake is a lake in the U.S. state of Wisconsin.

A variant name is "Lake Thomas". The lake most likely is named after Thomas Clements, a local landowner.
