= John Isted (MP) =

16th-century English politician

John Isted (fl. 1523 – will proved 1557) was an English politician.

== Family ==
Isted was married to Anne, and they had two sons and four daughters. He also had an illegitimate son.

== Career ==
He was a member (MP) of the parliament of England for Hastings in 1547, March 1553 and April 1554.
