= John Durrant (MP) =

16th-century English politician

John Durrant (by 1491 – 1543 or later), of Hastings, Sussex, was an English Member of Parliament. He represented Hastings in 1529 and ?1539.
