= John Harry (MP) =

English politician

John Harry (fl. 1410) was an English politician.

He was a member (MP) of the parliament of England for Hastings in 1410.
