= Thomas Lake (died 1606) =

16th-century English politician

Thomas Lake (died 1606), of Fairlight and Hastings, Sussex, was an English politician.

Lake was a Member of Parliament for Hastings in 1572, 1584 and 1586.
