= Patrick Robertson (politician) =

Patrick Francis Robertson (24 August 1807 – 20 January 1885) was a British businessman and a Liberal Conservative MP for Hastings, East Sussex, England.

== Early life ==
Robertson was born on 24 August 1807 in Meigle, Perthshire, Scotland, the oldest son of Daniel Robertson (1755–1817) and Isabella Small (1774–1811). His father was a professor of Oriental Languages at St. Mary's College, St. Andrews, Scotland, from 1809 to 1817. His maternal grandfather was Alexander Small, Minister of Newtyle and Kilconquhar, Scotland. The family was a member of the Smalls of Dirnanean.

Robertson's mother died when he was four. Robertson and his two younger siblings were primarily raised by a maternal aunt, Cecilia Small, after his mother's death.

== Business career ==
Robertson obtained his formal education at the University of St. Andrews. After graduating, Robertson joined other members of his extended family in the East India and China trade, becoming a wealthy man. He lived for a time in Canton, China.

Positions as a sub-governor for the London Assurance Corporation, department-chairman of the Banque Misr, and director of the Oriental Bank and the Ceylon Co, eventually followed for Robertson.

Around Hastings, Robertson was known for his real estate development projects.

== Political career ==
Robertson was a Deputy-Lieutenant of Sussex and a Justice of the Peace for the borough of Hastings.

In 1847 Robertson was an unsuccessful candidate for Parliament. He ran again and won election as a Liberal Conservative for Hastings in July 1852, serving until April 1859. He chose to run again in October 1864, but was not re-elected until July 1865. He declared himself retired in 1868, but unsuccessfully ran yet again in 1869 and 1874.

== Death and legacy ==
A lifelong bachelor, Patrick Francis Robertson died on 20 January 1885 in Hampstead, Middlesex, England.

Robertson's estate in Hastings, on Old London Road, was named Halton House. The mansion house no longer exists, but the hill where it stood is called Robertson Hill. Robertson Street and Robertson Terrace, sites within a large-scale development belonging to Robertson, are also named after him.
