= Edward More (MP) =

16th-century English politician

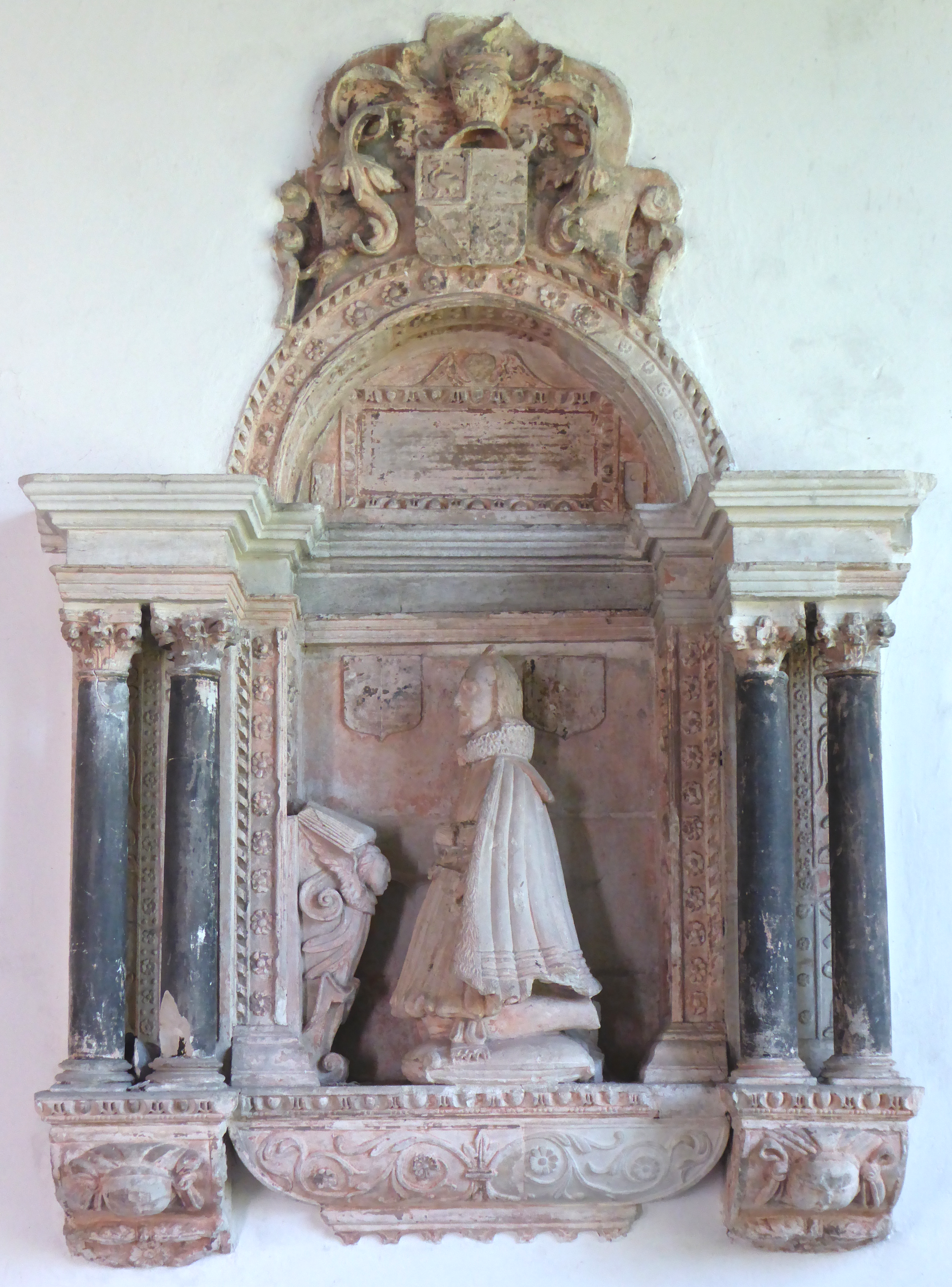
Mural monument in Broadhembury Church, Devon, to Sir Edward More (c. 1555–1623), as identified by his arms above. One of his two daughters and co-heiresses was Elizabeth More, who married Sir Thomas Drewe (d. 1651) of The Grange in the parish of Broadhembury in Devon, Sheriff of Devon in 1612

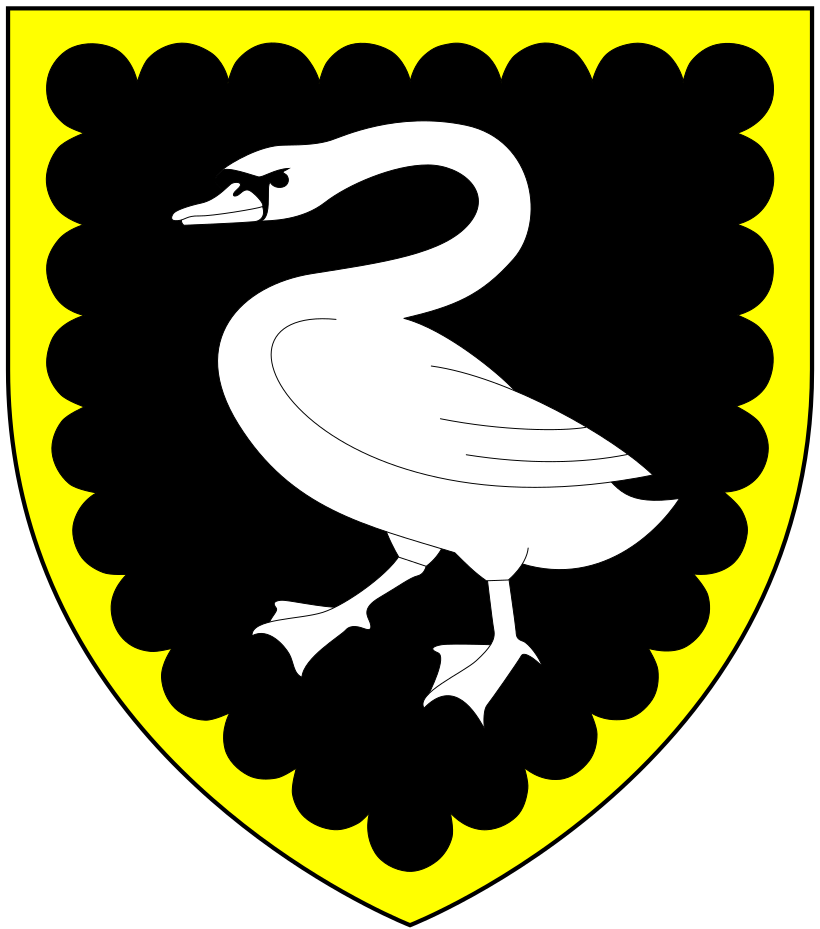
Arms of More of Odiham: Sable, a swan argent a bordure engrailed or, with crest above

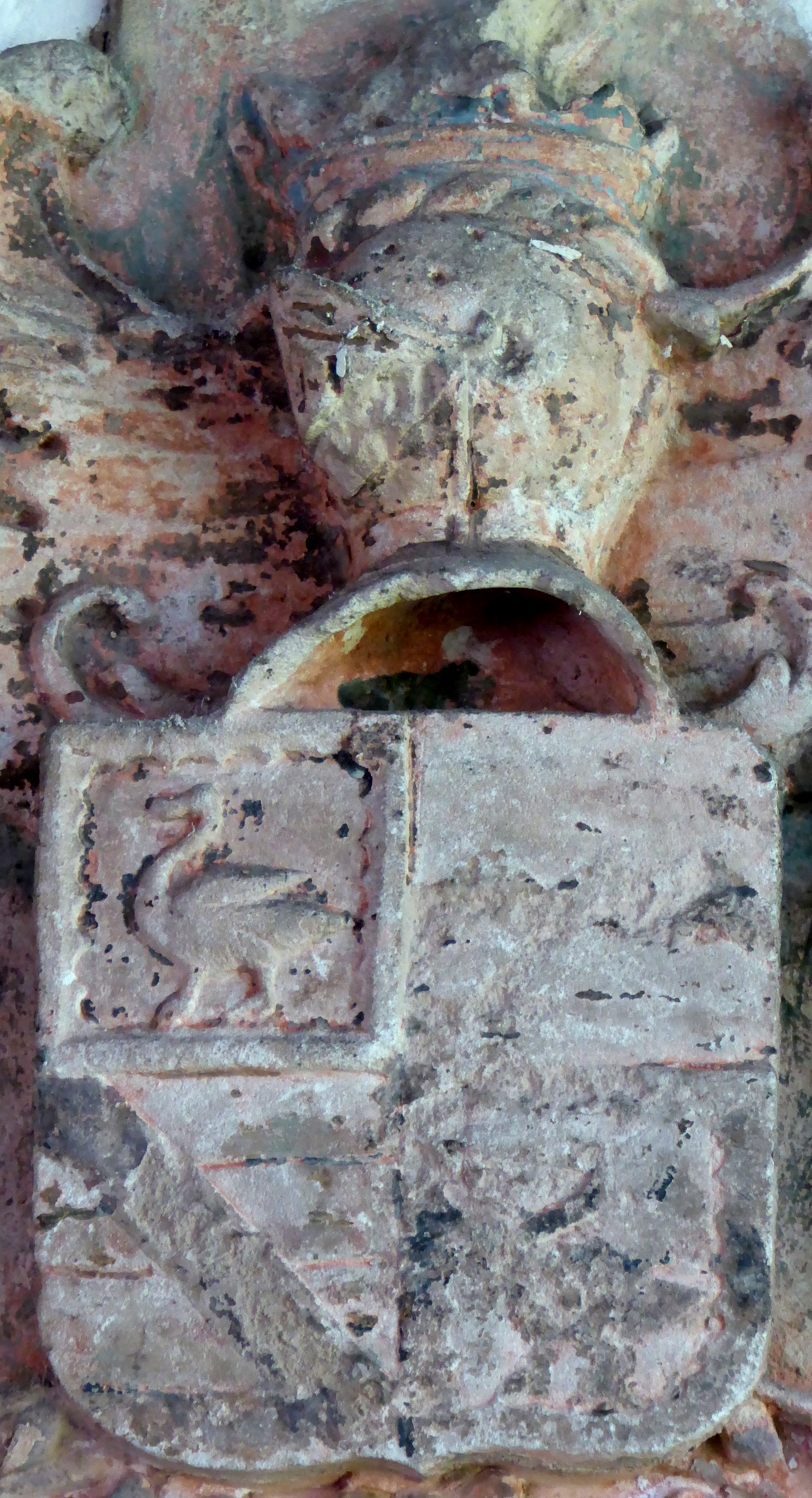
Arms of More (Sable, a swan argent a bordure engrailed or) shown in 1st and 4th quarters, 2nd quarter: effaced; 3rd quarter: ...overall a bend..., top of monument in Broadhembury Church, Devon

Sir Edward More (c. 1555–1623) of Odiham in Hampshire was an English member of parliament. He was a justice of the peace for Surrey and Sussex from c. 1582 to c. 1587, and for Hampshire from c. 1584. He succeeded his father in 1581 and was knighted in 1600.

== Origins ==
He was the son of John More (d. 1581) of Canon Row in Westminster, and of Crabbet in the parish of Worth in Sussex, a member of parliament for Winchelsea, by his wife Agnes Moulton (d. 1557), daughter and heiress of John Moulton of Lancashire and Westminster.

== Career ==
More commenced his study of law at the Middle Temple, bound with his father and Richard Inkpen, but his name disappears from Middle Temple records after a fine for absence from readings and a pardon for another on grounds of ill health. It shortly reappears among the Gentlemen Pensioners at court. Between the late 1570s and the death of Queen Elizabeth I (1558–1603), at whose funeral he was an official attendant, he divided his time between the court and his country estates in Sussex and later Hampshire. He corresponded at length with Robert Cecil over the will of Lady Dacre (d. 1595) (widow of Gregory Fiennes, 10th Baron Dacre), who left a large part of her estates in Sussex and London to the Cecil family. More was one of the executors of the will.

== Marriages and children ==
More fathered several illegitimate children, but married twice:

- Firstly to Mary Poynings (d. 29 October 1591), a daughter and co-heiress of Sir Adrian Poynings of Wherwell in Hampshire, by whom he had five sons (all of whom predeceased him) and one surviving daughter and heiress:
  - Elizabeth More, who married Sir Thomas Drewe (d.1651) of The Grange in the parish of Broadhembury in Devon, Sheriff of Devon in 1612.
- Secondly he married Frances Brooke, a daughter of William Brooke, 10th Baron Cobham and widow of John Stourton, 9th Baron Stourton, by whom he had one daughter:
  - Frances More (d. 5 January 1662), who married William Stourton, 11th Baron Stourton, nephew of her mother's first husband.

== Sources ==
- More, Edward (c.1555–1623), of Crabbet, Worth, Sussex, Canon Row, Westminster, and Odiham, Hampshire, History of Parliament Retrieved 16 March 2016.
