= Vincent Fynch =

Vincent Fynch may refer to:

- Vincent Fynch (fl. 1366), MP for Winchelsea in 1366, father of Vincent Fynch (MP 1395–1402)
- Vincent Fynch (MP 1395–1402), MP for Winchelsea
- Vincent Fynch (MP 1406 and 1426) (d.c.1430), MP for Winchelsea and Sussex
