= Fynch =

Fynch is a surname. Notable people with the surname include:

- Martin Fynch (c. 1628–1698), English ejected minister
- Vincent Fynch (disambiguation), multiple people

== See also ==
- Finch (surname)
- Lynch (surname)
