= Thomas Ashburnham =

Thomas Ashburnham may refer to:

- Thomas Ashburnham (general) (1808–1872), commander of British troops in China and Hong Kong
- Thomas Ashburnham, 6th Earl of Ashburnham (1855–1924), British Army officer and peer
- Thomas Ashburnham (MP) (by 1462–1523), English politician
