= Baron Howard of Escrick =

Extinct barony in the Peerage of England

- Blazon Arms: Quarterly: 1st, Gules, a Bend between six Crosses-Crosslet fitchée Argent, on the bend an Escutcheon Or, charged with a Demi-Lion rampant pierced through the mouth with an Arrow within a Double Tressure flory counterflory all Gules, (for Howard of Glossop); 2nd, Gules, three Lions passant guardant in pale Or, and in chief a Label of three-points Argent (for Brotherton); 3rd, Chequy Or and Azure, (for Warren); 4th, Gules, a Lion rampant Or (for Fitzalan), the whole differenced by a Crescent charged with a Cross. Crest: on a Chapeau Gules, turned up Ermine, a Lion statant guardant with tail extended Or, ducally gorged Argent, differenced by a Crescent charged with a Cross. Supporters: On either side a Lion Argent, charged on the shoulder with a Crescent charged with a Cross for difference.
- Creation date: 12 April 1678
- Created by: Charles I
- First holder: Edward Howard, 1st Baron Howard of Escrick
- Last holder: Charles Howard, 4th Baron Howard of Escrick
- Status: Extinct
- Extinction date: 29 April 1715
- Motto: NOUS MAINTIENDRONE (We will maintain); NON QUO SED QUO MODO (Not what, but how)

Baron Howard of Escrick was a title in the Peerage of England. It was created on 12 April 1628 for Edward Howard. A member of the influential Howard family, he was the youngest son of Thomas Howard, 1st Earl of Suffolk, the son of Thomas Howard, 4th Duke of Norfolk by his second wife Margaret Audley (see Earl of Suffolk and Duke of Norfolk for more information). The third Baron represented Winchelsea in the House of Commons and was also accused of being involved in the Rye House Plot; later he became a notorious informer in State trials, earning much hatred and contempt as a result. The title became extinct on the death of his son, the fourth Baron, in 1715.

== Barons Howard of Escrick (1628) ==
- Edward Howard, 1st Baron Howard of Escrick (d. 1675)
- Thomas Howard, 2nd Baron Howard of Escrick (1625–1678)
- William Howard, 3rd Baron Howard of Escrick (d. 1694)
- Charles Howard, 4th Baron Howard of Escrick (d. 1715)

== See also ==
- Duke of Norfolk
- Earl of Suffolk
