= African Company =

African Company may refer to:

- Guinea Company (London), also known as the Company of Adventurers of London Trading to the Ports of Africa
- Royal African Company, 17th- and 18th-century English chartered company mainly active in the Atlantic slave trade
- African Company of Merchants, 18th- and 19th-century British Chartered Company in the Gold Coast of Africa, successor of the above
- African Grove, theatre founded and operated by free African Americans in New York City in 1821
