= John Crisp =

John Crisp may refer to:

- John Crysp, MP for Canterbury
- John Crisp, late 18th century deputy governor of British Bencoolen
- Sir John Wilson Crisp, 3rd Baronet (1873–1950), of the Crisp baronets
- Sir John Peter Crisp, 4th Baronet (1925–2005), of the Crisp baronets
- Sir John Charles Crisp, 5th Baronet (b. 1955), of the Crisp baronets

== See also ==
- Jack Crisp, Australian rules footballer
- Richard John Crisp, psychologist
