= Petyt =

Petyt is a surname. Notable people with the surname include:

- K. M. Petyt (born 1941), sociolinguist and historian
- William Petyt (1640/1641–1707), English barrister and writer
- Cyriak Petyt (by 1517–before 1591), English politician
- Maria Petyt (1623–1677), Flemish mystic
