= Lowys =

Lowys is a surname. Notable people with the surname include:

- George Lowys (by 1500–1553/54), English politician
- Simon Lowys, MP for Liskeard
