= Charles Middleton, 2nd Earl of Middleton =

English and Scottish politician (1649/50–1719)

The Right Honourable The Earl of Middleton PC
- Coat of arms of the Earl of Middleton

Secretary of State for the Southern Department
- In office 28 October 1688 – 2 December 1688
- Monarch: James II
- Preceded by: The Earl of Sunderland
- Succeeded by: The Earl of Shrewsbury

Secretary of State for the Northern Department
- In office 24 August 1684 – 28 October 1688
- Monarchs: Charles II; James II
- Preceded by: Sidney Godolphin
- Succeeded by: The Viscount Preston

Secretary of State in Scotland
- In office 26 September 1682 – 24 August 1684 Serving with The Earl of Moray
- Monarch: Charles II
- Preceded by: The Earl of Moray
- Succeeded by: The Earl of Moray; John Drummond

Jacobite Secretary of State
- In office 1693–1713
- Monarchs: James II; James III
- Preceded by: The Duke of Melfort
- Succeeded by: Thomas Higgons

Personal details
- Born: Charles Middleton; 1650
- Died: 9 August 1719
- Resting place: Saint-Germain, France
- Spouse: Lady Catherine Brudenell (c. 1648–1743)
- Parent: John Middleton, 1st Earl of Middleton (father)
- Occupation: Politician and soldier

Charles Middleton, 2nd Earl of Middleton, Jacobite 1st Earl of Monmouth, PC (1649/1650 – 9 August 1719) was a Scottish and English politician who held several offices under Charles II and James II & VII. He served as Secretary of State for Scotland, the Northern Department and the Southern Department, before acting as Jacobite Secretary of State and chief advisor to James II and then his son James III during their exile in France.

== Life ==
Charles Middleton was born around 1650, the only son of John Middleton, 1st Earl of Middleton, and his first wife Grizel Durham. He had two elder sisters, Helen and Grizel.

Originally from Kincardineshire, in the first part of the 1638 to 1651 Wars of the Three Kingdoms, John Middleton supported the Covenanters, who appointed him commander-in-chief in 1644. After switching sides in 1648, he accompanied Charles II into exile, and Charles grew up in exile, returning home in the 1660 Restoration.

His father died in 1674 leaving him little except for the title and debts; in 1683, Charles married Lady Catherine Brudenell, (1648–1743), daughter of the Catholic Earl of Cardigan. They had four children:

- John Middleton (1683–1746);
- Katherine Middleton (1685–1763);
- Charles Middleton (1688–1738); and
- Elizabeth Middleton (26 June 1690 – 1773), who married 25 November 1709 at St Germain's to Edward Drummond (died 7 February 1760 at Paris), 6th Duke of Perth (in the Jacobite peerage), titular 9th Earl of Perth, the 1st Duke's third son.

Middleton was described by Gilbert Burnet as ‘a man of generous temper, but without much religion’; he remained a Protestant until 1701, when he converted to Catholicism at the request of the dying James II.

== Career ==
Middleton is thought to have spent 1669 to 1671 in France and Italy; in 1673, he was commissioned as a captain in the 3rd Foot, later the Buffs, which served in the 1672-1678 Franco-Dutch War as part of the Dutch Scots Brigade. By 1678, he was a Lieutenant-Colonel and governor of Bruges.

Shortly after this, he was suggested as Secretary of State for Scotland, in place of the Duke of Lauderdale. This went to Alexander Stuart, 5th Earl of Moray and in June 1680, Middleton was made envoy to Emperor Leopold I.

He returned to Scotland in July 1681, where he became a close associate of James and his wife Mary of Modena. He was appointed to the Scottish Privy Council and made joint Secretary of State for Scotland with Moray on 26 September 1682.

In 1684, he relocated to London and joined the English Privy Council in July and Secretary of State for the Northern Department in August. After James succeeded as king in February 1685, he was elected for Winchelsea and given the task of managing the House of Commons. Parliament was suspended for refusing to repeal the Test Act, while James' reliance on a small circle of Catholics made Middleton suspect as one of the few remaining Protestants.

He was present at the birth of the Prince of Wales in June 1688 and became Secretary of State for the Southern Department in September 1688. When James fled to France after the November 1688 Glorious Revolution, he remained in England; in 1692, he was held in the Tower of London for plotting to restore him and after his release, joined the exiled court at Saint-Germain.

He proposed a more moderate declaration for a Jacobite restoration than James' chief advisor and Secretary of State, John Drummond, 1st Earl of Melfort. He became joint Secretary of State with Melfort, responsible for correspondence with England and Scotland, and became sole Secretary of State after Melfort was dismissed in June 1694. In England, he was tried in absentia for treason and outlawed on 23 July 1694, and attainted on 2 July 1695.

He continued as Secretary until James' death in September 1701, when he was appointed to the Regency Council during the minority of his son, James III. Despite his wish to resign, he was persuaded to remain in office and made the Earl of Monmouth in the Jacobite peerage.

With his two sons, Middleton accompanied James in 1708 during the attempted Franco-Jacobite landing in Scotland and allowed to resign as Secretary in 1713. He briefly joined James in Scotland during the 1715 Rising, before returning to France, where he served as Mary's Lord Chamberlain until her death in 1718. Granted a pension by the French government, he died on 9 August 1719 and was buried at the parish church of Saint-Germain.

== Sources ==
- Corp, Edward (2004). "Middleton, Charles, styled second earl of Middleton and Jacobite first earl of Monmouth (1649/50–1719)". Oxford Dictionary of National Biography (online ed.). Oxford University Press. doi:10.1093/ref:odnb/18665. (Subscription, Wikipedia Library access or UK public library membership required.)
- Fugrol, Edward (2004). "Middleton, John, first earl of Middleton". Oxford Dictionary of National Biography (Online ed.). Oxford University Press. doi:10.1093/ref:odnb/18674. (Subscription, Wikipedia Library access or UK public library membership required.)
- Henning, BD (1983). MIDDLETON, Charles, 2nd Earl of Middleton [S]. (c.1650-1719) in The History of Parliament: the House of Commons 1660-1690 (Online ed.). Boydell and Brewer.
- Middleton, Dorothy (1957). The Life Of Charles 2nd Earl Of Middleton 1650 1719. Staples.

Parliament of England
Preceded by Cresheld Draper; Sir Stephen Lennard, Bt	Member of Parliament for Winchelsea; 1685–1689; With: Cresheld Draper	Succeeded by Robert Austen; Samuel Western
Political offices
Preceded by The Earl of Moray	Secretary of State for Scotland; 1682–1684; With: The Earl of Moray	Succeeded by The Earl of Moray; John Drummond
Preceded by The Lord Godolphin	Secretary of State for the Northern Department; 1684–1688	Succeeded by The Viscount Preston
Preceded by The Earl of Sunderland	Secretary of State for the Southern Department; 1688	Succeeded by The Earl of Shrewsbury
Preceded by John Drummond	Jacobite Secretary of State; 1693–1713	Succeeded by Thomas Higgons
Peerage of Scotland
Preceded by John Middleton	Earl of Middleton; 1674–1695	Attainted
Peerage of England
New creation	— TITULAR — Earl of Monmouth; Jacobite peerage 1701–1718	Succeeded by John Middleton
