= Crispe baronets =

Extinct baronetcy in the Baronetage of England

The Crispe (or Crisp) Baronetcy, of Hammersmith in the County of Middlesex, was a title in the Baronetage of England. It was created on 14 April 1665 for the merchant and politician Sir Nicholas Crispe. The title became extinct on the death of the fifth Baronet in 1740.

Tobias Crisp, brother of the first Baronet, was a noted clergyman.

== Crispe baronets, of Hammersmith (1665) ==
Escutcheon of the Crispe baronets

- Sir Nicholas Crispe, 1st Baronet (c. 1598–1666)
- Sir Nicholas Crispe, 2nd Baronet (c. 1643–1698)
- Sir John Crispe, 3rd Baronet (c. 1676–1728)
- Sir Nicholas Crispe, 4th Baronet (c. 1718–1730)
- Sir Charles Crispe, 5th Baronet (c. 1680–1740)

== See also ==
- Crisp baronets
