= Philip Chute =

16th-century English politician

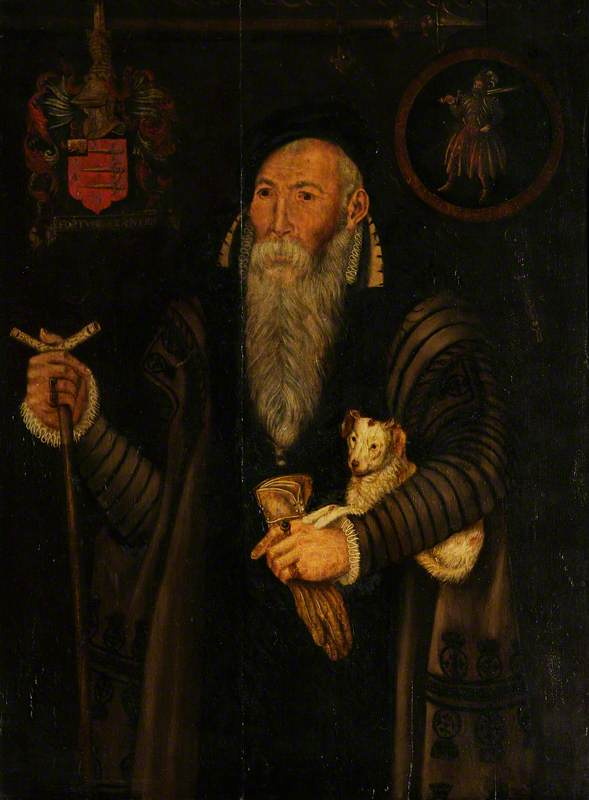
Philip Chute of Appledore, Kent, Standard-Bearer to Henry VIII, with the Royal Augmentation to His Coat of Arms, early 1700s portrait.

Philip Chute or Chowte (at least 1506 – 1567), of Horne Place, Appledore, Kent, was an English member of parliament in Elizabethan England.

He was the son of Charles Chute of West Malling, Kent. By 1537 he had married Joan, the widowed daughter of Thomas Ensing (d. 1539) of Winchelsea. He became a yeoman of the guard and in 1540 was appointed the first captain of Camber castle.

He sat as MP for Winchelsea 1542 and 1545, a seat previously represented by his father-in-law.

He was standard-bearer to Henry VIII at the Siege of Boulogne in 1544, for which he was awarded an augmentation to his coat of arms. During the siege he was involved in the transporting of the necessary materials and equipment by wagon.

By 1546 he had married Margaret (d. 1555), daughter of Sir Alexander Culpeper of Bedgebury, Kent. In 1552 he purchased the manor of Old Surrenden in Bethersden, Kent.

Philip Chute was given Horne's Place by Queen Mary I. In 1557 he was appointed comptroller of the customs.

He wrote his will on 1 March 1565 and it was proved on 1 February 1569. He left an extensive estate, making provision not only for his own large family, but also that of his brother Anthony. His son George followed his father into a military career and, being sent to Ireland at the time of the Desmond rebellion, established a branch of the family there.
