= Ensing =

Ensing is a surname. Notable people with the surname include:

- Janneke Ensing (born 1986), Dutch speed skater and cyclist
- Kyle Ensing (born 1997), American indoor volleyball player
- Riemke Ensing (born 1939), Dutch-born New Zealand poet
- Thomas Ensing (by 1490–c.1539), English politician
