= John Tamworth (MP for Winchelsea and Hastings) =

English Member of Parliament

John Tamworth (fl. 1419-1445), of Winchelsea, was an English Member of Parliament. He was a Member (MP) of the Parliament of England for Winchelsea in 1419, 1422, 1427 and for Hastings in 1435 and 1445. He was Mayor of Winchelsea 1421-2.
