= Chute baronets =

There have been two baronetcies created for persons with the surname Chute, one in the Baronetage of England and one in the Baronetage of the United Kingdom. Both creations are extinct.

- Chute baronets of Hinxhill Place (1684): see Sir George Chute, 1st Baronet (1665–1722)
- Chute baronets of The Vyne (1952): see Charles Chute (1879–1956)
