= William Hazlitt (Unitarian minister) =

Unitarian minister and author (1737–1820)

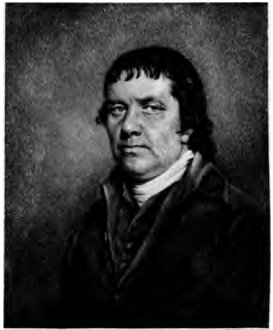
- The Reverend William Hazlitt, from a miniature portrait by his son John
- Born: 18 April 1737; Shronell, County Tipperary, Ireland
- Died: 20 July 1820 (aged 83); Crediton, Devon, England
- Resting place: Crediton Parish Church
- Education: University of Glasgow
- Occupation: Unitarian minister
- Spouse: Grace Loftus (1746 – 1837)
- Children: John, Margaret, William

Signature
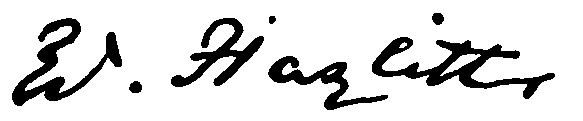

William Hazlitt (18 April 1737 – 16 July 1820) was a Unitarian minister and author, and the father of the Romantic essayist and social commentator of the same name. He was an important figure in eighteenth-century English and American Unitarianism, and had a major influence on his son's work.

== Biography ==
=== Early life ===
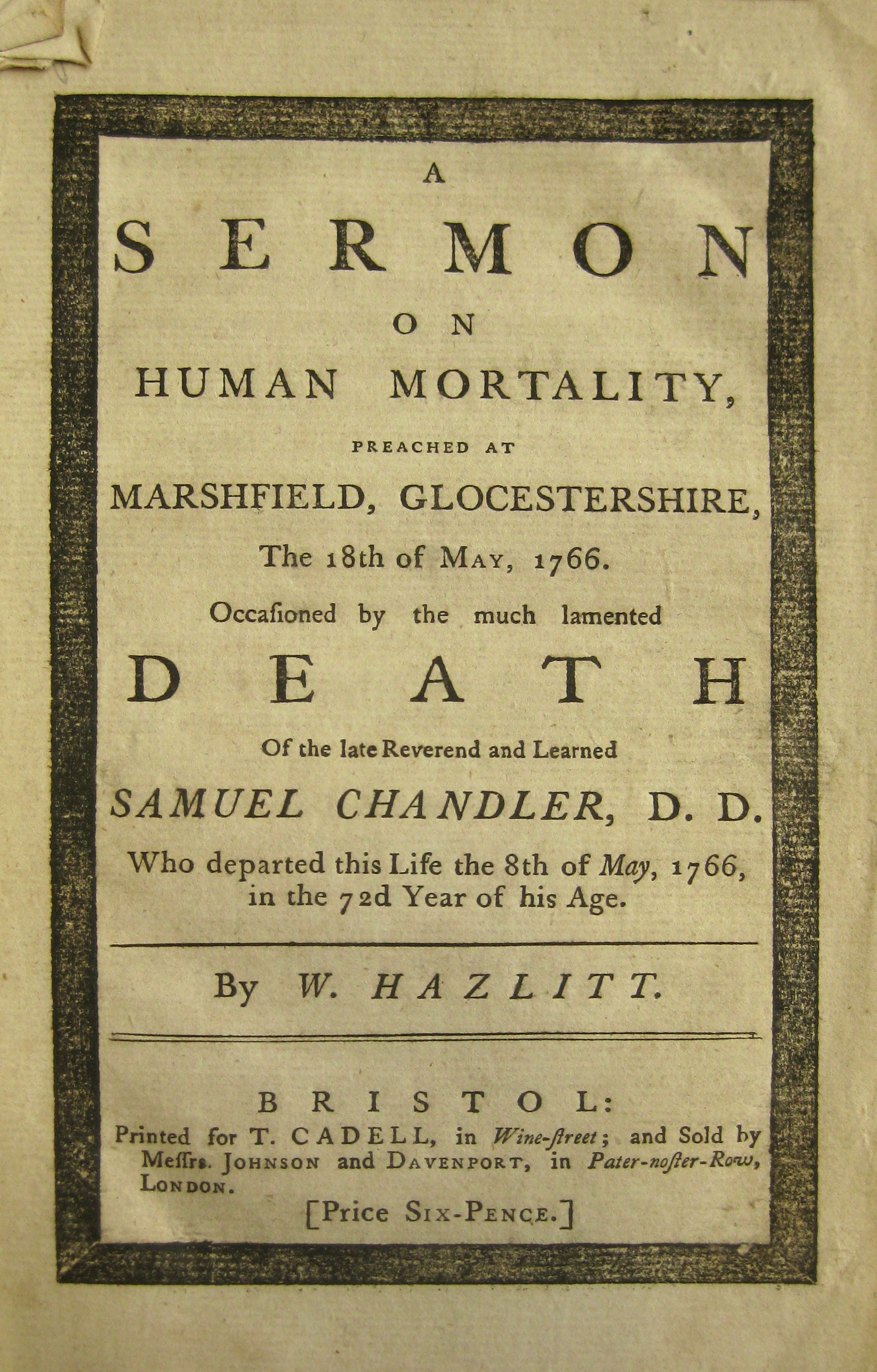
Title page of Hazlitt's Sermon on Human Mortality (1766)

Hazlitt was born to Presbyterian parents at Shronell, County Tipperary, in Ireland, and was educated at a grammar school. He matriculated at the University of Glasgow in 1756, where he was taught by Adam Smith, Joseph Black and James Watt. Hazlitt was exposed to a range of controversial religious and philosophical views while at university, and it is possible that he converted to Unitarianism at this time. After graduating he became a chaplain to Sir Conyers Jocelyn at Hyde Hall, Sawbridgeworth, Hertfordshire, and then worked as a minister at Wisbech. In 1766 he married Grace Loftus, before moving to Marshfield in Gloucestershire. In the same year he commenced his literary career, when Benjamin Davenport and Joseph Johnson published Hazlitt's Sermon on Human Mortality.

=== Preaching in England and Ireland ===
In 1770 William and Grace Hazlitt, along with their sons John and Loftus, moved to Maidstone in Kent. Soon after their arrival, their son Loftus, only two and a half years old, died. A daughter, Margaret, was born in December. During this period Hazlitt maintained ties with figures such as Joseph Priestley, Richard Price and Benjamin Franklin, and was an active writer, contributing to Priestley's Theological Repository under the pseudonyms "Philalethes" and "Rationalis", and publishing five religious volumes. His work provoked a substantial body of writing by other authors. In 1778 his son William was born.

Hazlitt's writings at this time included pamphlets entitled The Methodists Vindicated (1771) and Human Authority in Matters of Faith Repugnant to Christianity (1774). Stephen Burley, who has investigated Hazlitt's authorship of these works, describes Hazlitt's position in Methodists Vindicated as follows:

He sets out to subvert preconceptions about social and ecclesiastical hierarchies in a sweeping attack on the legitimacy of the Established Church and its clergy. He argues for a distinctly egalitarian faith which comprehends both men and women, rich and poor.

Hazlitt was, in the words of Duncan Wu, "essentially a Socinian" in his religious beliefs. His writings criticise the persistence of Catholic doctrines in the Anglican church which, in Hazlitt's view, have no basis in scripture. As a Unitarian, he also rejected the Trinity, and instead offered a form of religious faith "founded in reason". The rejection of the established church, and of religious hierarchies, was also central to Hazlitt's doctrine. He even called on parliament to adopt his form of Unitarianism, revealing the extent to which his religious beliefs had a politically radical edge. The literary critic Tom Paulin has also highlighted Hazlitt's political radicalism, associating him with the "Real Whig" political tendency that developed from the commonwealthmen of the seventeenth century, and which was characterised by republican beliefs. A friend of Hazlitt described him as "an ultra-Dissenter, and in politics a republican".

In 1780 Hazlitt returned to Ireland, ministering to a congregation at Bandon in County Cork for three years. Another son, Thomas, was born soon after the Hazlitts' arrival in 1780; he survived only a few weeks. A daughter, Harriet, was born in late 1781 or early 1782. During this time Hazlitt exposed in the press the abuse of American prisoners of war at Kinsale prison, which led to the replacement of the regiment accused of perpetrating the abuses. He also defended Roman Catholics from violent abuse by British soldiers. However, the consequence of this was that Hazlitt himself became the target of abuse, it being reported that people cried out "beware of the black rebel" when he walked down the street.

=== America, 1783–6 ===
Hazlitt's sympathy with the American cause, and the threats of physical harm which he received in Ireland, led him to emigrate to America in April 1783, sailing on the first ship which departed following the conclusion of the American Revolutionary War. The Hazlitt family first lived in Philadelphia, where they were doubly stricken with loss. Harriet died in June at about eighteen months old. Another daughter, Esther, the last of the seven Hazlitt children, was born a few weeks later, only to die in September. Their loss was noted to have deeply affected their father. Hazlitt failed to find a post as a minister in Philadelphia, and Duncan Wu has argued that this influenced the condemnatory tone of Hazlitt's preface to his edited collection of three pamphlets by Joseph Priestley. The collection was issued by Robert Bell, the publisher of Thomas Paine's Common Sense. Indeed, the publication of Hazlitt's edition of Priestley's writings was motivated by the need to publish a profitable work, which would make up for the losses that Common Sense incurred. Hazlitt used Bell to distribute unsold copies of a pamphlet that he had published in 1773, which provided him with much-needed income.

When Dickinson College was founded in 1783, Hazlitt had the opportunity to become its first principal, in addition to being appointed to a living at Carlisle which brought 400 guineas a year. However, the congregation of Carlisle demanded that Hazlitt sign a confession of faith as a condition of his appointment – Hazlitt refused, thereby rejecting the greatest opportunity for personal enrichment that he would have in his entire life, stating (according to his daughter, Margaret) that "he would sooner die in a ditch than submit to human authority in matters of faith". During this time Hazlitt delivered lectures on the evidences of Christianity at the University of Pennsylvania, and published popular sermons and tracts, in addition to writing for several local periodicals.

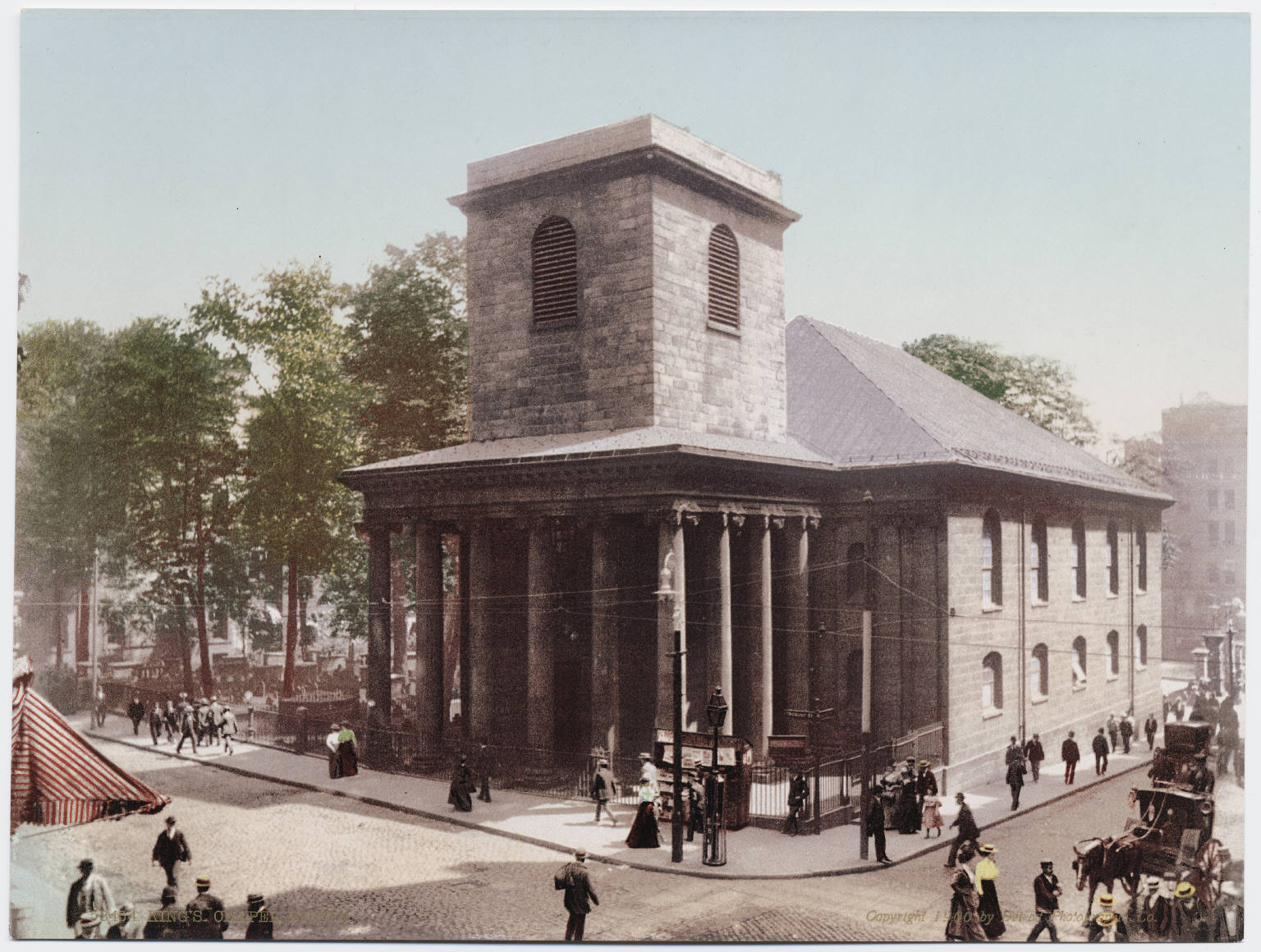
King's Chapel, Boston, in 1900.

Hazlitt had an important influence on James Freeman's conversion of the King's Chapel in Boston into America's first Unitarian congregation. When Hazlitt arrived in Boston, Freeman was embroiled in a controversy arising from his Arian beliefs, which—like Hazlitt's own Unitarian doctrines—meant that he held unorthodox views about the Holy Trinity. This meant that he was denied ordination by Samuel Seabury, bishop of the Episcopal Church. However, the congregation of the King's Chapel was supportive of Freeman, and Hazlitt encouraged them—both in print, and from the King's Street pulpit—to ignore the bishop and accept Freeman as their pastor. This was a controversial view, since the notion of "lay ordination" was inimical to episcopalianism. On 19 June 1785, the King's Chapel changed its liturgy, removing references to the Trinity and adopting a new prayer book; in November 1787 it ended its affiliation with the Episcopal Church altogether.

Hazlitt also criticised Roman Catholic, Anglican and Episcopalian practices in his writings. He questioned the Biblical basis for praising the Holy Spirit, and disputed the value of the Thirty-Nine Articles of the Church of England, as he had done in his writings from the previous decade.

=== Minister at Wem ===
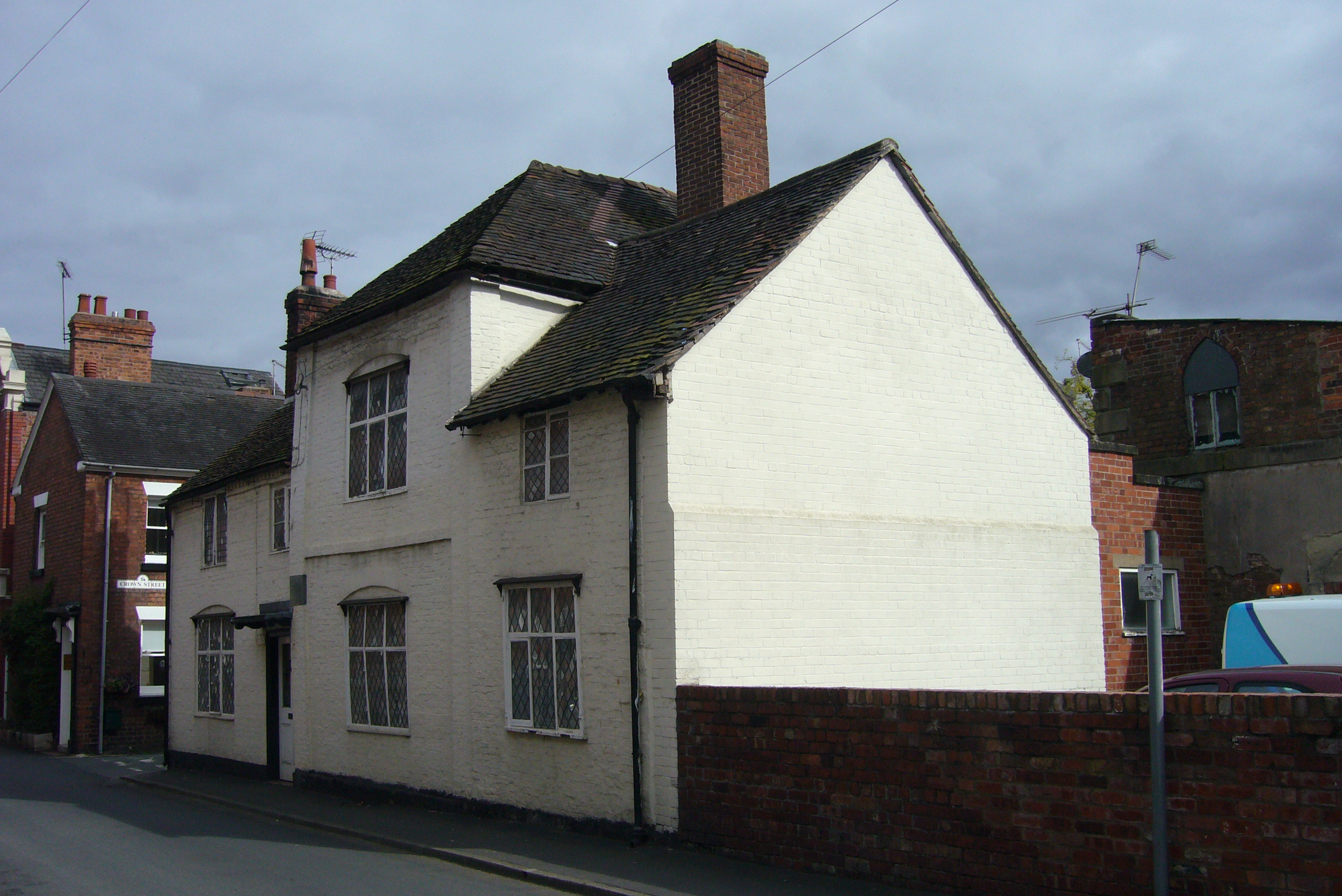
Hazlitt's house in Wem, Shropshire.

Despite achieving some success as a writer, Hazlitt was unable to secure a permanent post, and in 1786 he returned to England. After failing to obtain a steady income in London, Hazlitt settled with his family at Wem in Shropshire. Hazlitt ministered at a dissenting meeting house in the town, for which he received a meagre annual stipend of £30, and ran the local school. He devoted much attention to the education of his son, William, with the intention that he would also become a Unitarian minister. While the Reverend William Hazlitt's intensive tutoring of his son may explain in part the brilliance of the latter's subsequent writings, it was also responsible for his physical and mental breakdown under the strain of his father's expectations. When the younger Hazlitt left the New College at Hackney after only two years, thereby signalling that he would never follow his father into the Unitarian ministry, the latter was bitterly disappointed. In 1798, Samuel Taylor Coleridge visited Hazlitt at Wem – an encounter which was later described by Hazlitt's son in the essay "My First Acquaintance with Poets". In the essay, Hazlitt's life at Wem is described as follows:

After being tossed about from congregation to congregation in the heats of the Unitarian controversy, and squabbles about the American war, he had been relegated to an obscure village, where he was to spend the last thirty years of his life, far from the only converse that he loved, the talk about disputed texts of Scripture, and the cause of civil and religious liberty. Here he passed his days, repining, but resigned, in the study of the Bible and the perusal of the Commentators – huge folios, not easily got through, one of which would outlast a winter! ... My father's life was comparatively a dream; but it was a dream of infinity and eternity, of death, the resurrection, and a judgment to come!

While Hazlitt's failure to secure a powerful position in the Unitarian ministry may have been a source of disappointment for him, he continued to participate in Unitarian debate on a national level. In addition to producing three volumes of sermons while living at Wem, he was a regular contributor to periodicals such as the Protestant Dissenter's Magazine and the Universal Theological Magazine.

In 1801 (possibly early 1802), Hazlitt's son William returned to Wem to paint his portrait. Sitting in the chapel at Wem, with the winter sun raking across the subject's face, the painter described his 64-year-old father as "then in a green old age, with strong-marked features, and scarred with the smallpox", who read an old copy of Shaftesbury's Characteristics as he sat. The painting – now in Maidstone Museum and Art Gallery – was shown at the prestigious Royal Academy summer exhibition in 1802. Paulin has argued that the younger Hazlitt's reference to Shaftesbury is significant, because it establishes "a deliberate connection between advanced Whig culture and his father in the tiny Unitarian meeting-house in Wem".

In his retirement, Hazlitt lived at Addlestone in Surrey, at Bath in Somerset, and at Crediton in Devon, where he died in 1820.
