= Robert Sparrow (died 1528) =

English politician

Robert Sparrow (by 1459 – 1528), of Winchelsea, Sussex, was an English politician.

He was a Jurat for Winchelsea from 1496 to death, Mayor of Winchelsea for 1501–02, 1511–12, 1517–18, 1524–25 and elected a Member of Parliament (MP) for Winchelsea 1510, 1512?, 1515? and 1523.
