= John Ashburnham (MP for Winchelsea) =

16th-century English politician

John Ashburnham (by 1483 – 1518/1523), of Guestling and Winchelsea, Sussex and High Halden, Kent, was an English politician.

He was the son of MP, Thomas Ashburnham.

He was a Member of Parliament (MP) for Winchelsea in 1512 and 1515.
