= John Hazlitt =

English painter

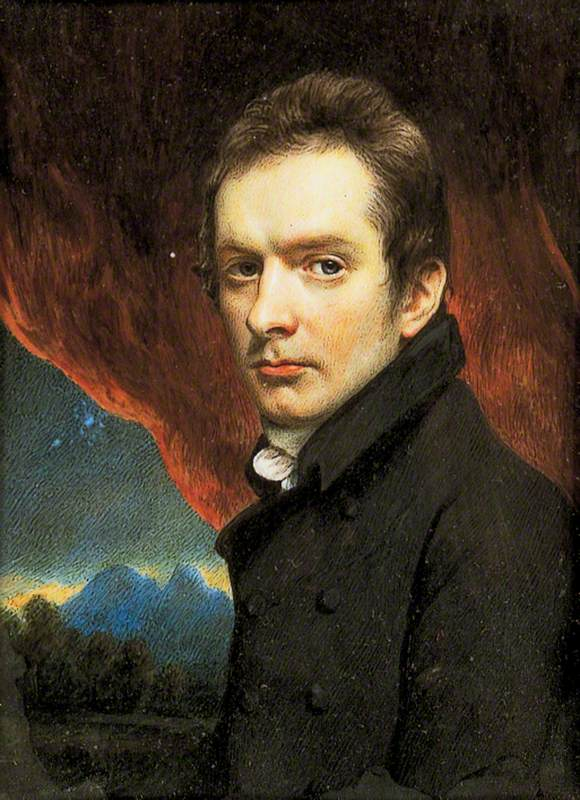
- Self-portrait
- Born: 13 May 1767; Marshfield, Gloucestershire, England
- Died: 16 May 1837 (aged 70); Stockport, Cheshire/Lancashire, England
- Education: Joshua Reynolds
- Known for: Miniature painting
- Spouse: Mary Peirce
- Parent: William Hazlitt (father)
- Relatives: William Hazlitt (brother)

John Hazlitt (13 May 1767 – 16 May 1837) was an English artist who specialised in miniature portrait painting. He was the eldest brother of William Hazlitt – a major essayist of the English Romantic period, as well as an artist and radical social commentator – and had a significant influence on his career.

== Life ==
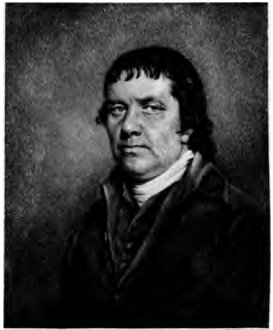
The Reverend William Hazlitt, depicted by his son John

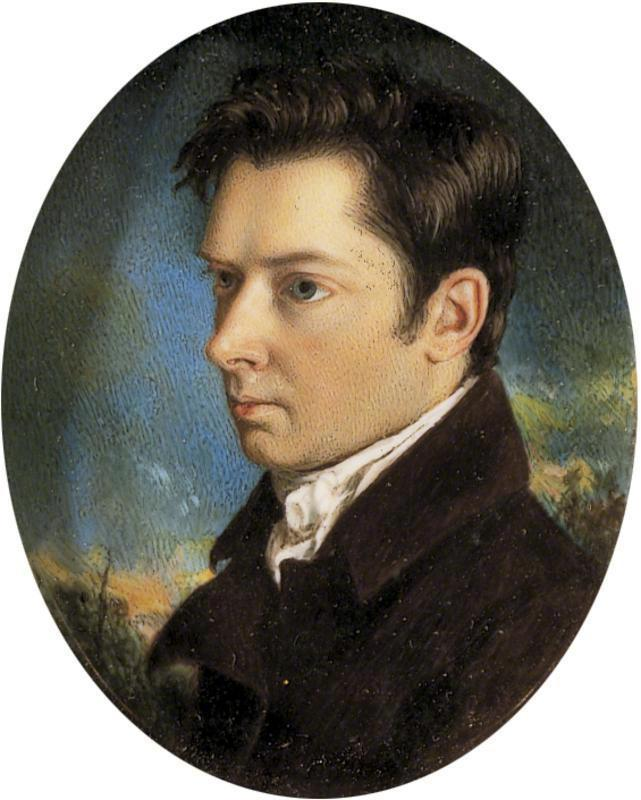
A miniature portrait of William Hazlitt, by his elder brother

Hazlitt was born in Marshfield, Gloucestershire, the first-born child of the Reverend William Hazlitt, a Unitarian minister, and Grace Loftus Hazlitt. After living in Maidstone in Kent, and in Bandon in County Cork, the family moved to the United States in 1783, living first in Philadelphia and then in Boston. In Boston John Hazlitt attempted to found a drawing school with Joseph Dunkerley, but the pair failed to attract enough subscribers. After trying to earn a living as a painter in Salem, he returned to England with the rest of his family in 1787.

His parents and younger siblings settled at Wem in Shropshire, but Hazlitt moved to London, where he studied painting under Sir Joshua Reynolds and became reacquainted with William Godwin, a radical philosopher and novelist. In 1788 he exhibited four miniature portraits derived from the work of Reynolds at the Royal Academy, and he exhibited paintings every year until 1819. In May 1789 he married Mary Peirce of Portsea, Portsmouth at St Anne's Church, Soho; he went on to paint several miniature portraits of her. He also painted portraits of Mary Lamb, Samuel Taylor Coleridge, Joseph Priestley and Edward Jenner. His acquaintance with figures such as John Thelwall, Thomas Holcroft, John Stoddart, Charles Lamb and William Godwin meant that it may have been through his brother that William Hazlitt first encountered men who had an important influence on his career as a writer. When William Hazlitt first moved to London he lived with his brother John, and it was John who taught him the art of painting, which he practised with some success.

In 1815 John Hazlitt applied for an associateship at the Royal Academy, but he did not receive a single vote in support. It is possible that William Hazlitt's strident criticism of the Academy contributed to this failure. John Hazlitt's response was to return to the alcoholism which had blighted his career.

John Hazlitt remained a political radical throughout his life, and held views that were even stronger than his brother's. Following his death in 1837, the Gentleman's Magazine published the following obituary:

May 16. At Stockport, in his 70th year, Mr. John Hazlitt, portrait painter, elder brother to William Hazlitt, the eloquent critic and essayist. His connection with Stockport commenced in May 1832, and there are a great many portraits of his execution in that town. He possessed great conversational ability, and was distinguished for the extent of his information and versatility of his powers; but was, like his brother, of an irritable temperament.

Some of Hazlitt's surviving miniatures are held by Maidstone Museum and Art Gallery. William Bentley, an American Unitarian minister, owned many of Hazlitt's works, and it is possible that these were donated to the American Antiquarian Society in 1819.

He was the great-great grandfather of Charles Upham, the only combat soldier to win two Victoria Crosses.
