= Thomas Higgons (Jacobite) =

English Jacobite

Sir Thomas Higgons (1668–1733) was an English Jacobite. From 1713 to 1715 he was the Jacobite Secretary of State in Paris, appointed by James Stuart to replace the long-serving Earl of Middleton.

== Background ==
He was the second son of Thomas Higgons, a politician and diplomat, and through his mother Bridget, the grandson of the royalist commander Sir Bevil Grenville. His younger brother Bevil Higgons became a writer. Denis Grenville was an uncle. The family were staunch supporters of James II.

Higgons went into exile in France shortly after the Glorious Revolution that overthrew James. In 1692 he crossed back to England with his two brothers to take part in the planned Jacobite uprising to coincide with the projected invasion of Britain, but these plans were wrecked by the French defeat at the Battle of La Hogue.

He served as a courtier at the exiled Jacobite court in Saint-Germain. From 1701 onwards he was Gentleman Usher of the Privy chamber to James III who had succeeded his father in Jacobite eyes.

== Secretary of State ==
When the Earl of Middleton stepped down as Secretary after twenty years, there was a desire to appoint a Protestant to demonstrate the tolerance of the Catholic James. Higgons was of a Church of England background.

Higgons has been described as a figurehead, with actual power was exercised by the King's half-brother Duke of Berwick. He was succeeded by the more prominent Henry St John who oversaw the Jacobite Rising of 1715.

== Bibliography ==
- Cruickshanks, Eveline. The Stuart Court in Exile and the Jacobites. A&C Black, 1995.
- Melville, Henry Massue Ruvigny Et Raineval. The Jacobite Peerage, Baronetage, Knightage, and Grants of Honour. Genealogical Publishing, 2003.
- Szechi, Daniel. 1715: The Great Jacobite Rebellion. Yale University Press, 2006.

Political offices
Preceded by Charles Middleton, 2nd Earl of Middleton	Jacobite Secretary of State; 1713–1715	Succeeded by Henry St John, 1st Viscount Bolingbroke
