= Thomas Hynxstend =

16th-century English politician

Thomas Hynxstend (by 1516 – 1545?), of Winchelsea, Sussex, was an English politician.

He was a Member of Parliament (MP) for Winchelsea in 1545.
