= Sir Nicholas Crispe, 1st Baronet =

English Royalist and wealthy merchant

Sir Nicholas Crisp, 1st Baronet
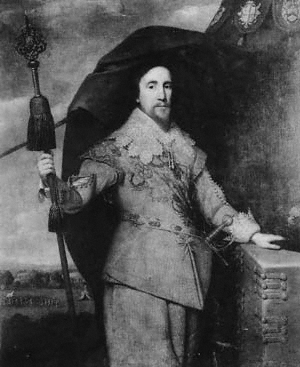
- portrait by Cornelis Janssens van Ceulen

Member of the April 1640 Parliament
- In office 1 January 1640 – 1641

Personal details
- Born: c. 1599
- Died: February 26, 1666
- Resting place: St Paul's Church, Hammersmith
- Parent(s): Ellis Crispe; Hester Ireland
- Occupation: Slave trader

Sir Nicholas Crispe, 1st Baronet (c. 1599 – 26 February 1666 (O.S)) was an English Royalist and a wealthy merchant who pioneered the West African slave trade in the 1630s; a customs farmer (1640 and c. 1661–6); Member of Parliament for Winchelsea Nov. 1640-1 (being expelled as a monopolist); member of the Council of Trade (from 1660) and for Foreign Plantations (from 1661); and Gentleman of the Privy Chamber from 1664. He was knighted in 1640 or 1641 and was made a baronet in 1665. He died in February 1666 (O.S.) aged 67.

== Early life ==
Little is known of his early life and even his name is variously spelled as Crisp or Crispe. He was the son of Ellis Crispe who was Sheriff of London and died in 1625. He was married to Anne Prescot and was the brother of Tobias Crisp, a prominent cleric and antinomian. Crisp made money from brickworks in Hammersmith then invested in other trade. Crisp's main commercial interests were in the trades to India and Africa. Like his father he was a substantial stockholder in the East India Company, and throughout his twenties he imported a wide variety of commodities, including cloves, indigo, silks, pepper, elephant tusks, calicoes, and shells. The shells were specially purchased on his behalf by the company's agents and it is thought that they were used to finance the purchase of slaves in west Africa.

== Guinea Company ==
The Company of Adventurers of London trading to the ports of Africa, or more commonly known as the Guinea Company, was the first private company to colonize Africa for profit. They were a trading company primarily exporting redwood (used for dyes) from the western parts of Africa. Nicholas Crisp started investing in the company in 1625 and became the controlling stock holder in 1628.

Nicholas Crisp got most of his royalist support through the building of trading forts on the Gold Coast of Komenda and Kormantin. The King, James I, saw them as a great value to future of English trade with Africa. It is estimated that Nicholas Crisp and his company made a profit of over £500,000 through the gold they had collected within the 11–12 years after 1632. In 1637, the Guinea Company, including Nicholas, reported that they had dispatched John Crispe as captain of merchantman Talbot "to take "nigers," and carry them to foreign parts."

According to British parliamentary records, the company also appears to have been involved in the trade of enslaved Africans.

A sizeable assemblage of early-17th century glass beads and 'wasters' were discovered in association with a brick furnace in the grounds of the private estate of Sir Nicholas Crisp (on what is now Hammersmith Embankment) during excavation in 2005. Crisp had a patent for making and vending beads and he also obtained a patent for slave trading from Guinea to the West Indies. These beads were probably used for both the local and colonial markets as researchers have uncovered similar beads in the Americas and in Ghana. This is the first clear archaeological evidence for the manufacture of early post-medieval glass beads in England.

Elected to the Long Parliament in 1640 to represent Winchelsea he was expelled in 1641 for collecting duties on merchandise which he used as security to loan money to the cash-strapped King Charles I without the authorization of Parliament.

On New Year's Day 1640, King Charles I knighted Crisp, recognising his past services, but perhaps more importantly, anticipating his further services.

== Civil War ==
Despite his loyalties to the King, who had fled to Oxford on the outbreak of the English Civil War, Crisp remained in Roundhead-controlled London. However he was questioned by the House of Commons in January 1643 about £3,700, which an intercepted letter revealed as owed to him 'for secrett service done for his Majestie'. He promptly slipped away to Oxford, where he was warmly welcomed by the King, but his homes in Hammersmith (Brandenburgh House) and Lime Street were ransacked.

Crisp was forced by Parliament to surrender his patents for making and vending beads and for slave trading from Guinea to the West Indies. An order relating to a debt owed by Sir Nicholas Crisp to the Navy was laid before the House of Lords in December 1643. The House of Commons of England had ordered that Crisp's share in the Guinea Company, his trading venture to Africa, should be used to cover this debt. The arrival of gold from this adventure now prompted the House of Lords to confirm that Crisp's share in this should be used to pay off the debt.

Crisp 's supported the King in a number of ways throughout the Civil War. He was at the centre of a plan in March 1643 to head a force to take over London, but the idea failed. A letter to him from Sir Thomas Ogle was intercepted and published. He was also frustrated in his attempts to raise an infantry regiment of 1,500 later that year.

However, on 6 May 1644, he was commissioned to equip 15 warships at his own and his partner's expense and granted a tenth of any prizes taken by them. Operating from west country ports, he ferried troops from Ireland and played an important role in shipping tin and wool to the continent. He would also bring back arms and ammunition as a return cargo, and ultimately held the important position of deputy controller-general of posts. His allegiance to the crown was steadfast, even after Charles I was executed in 1649 and he was forced to flee to France like many others. Family connections allowed him to return but his politics had not changed in the least and in the run up to the Restoration, Crisp performed secret services and raised money for exiled Charles II. He was among those London Royalists who signed the declaration in support of General Monk to restore the Stuart monarchy. He was also involved in clandestine support for royalist conspiracies, such as the abortive plot of 1650 to land forces from the Scillies on the Cornish coast.

In May 1660 Crisp was one of the committee sent to meet King Charles II at Breda as he returned to England to take to the throne his father had vacated.

== Later life ==
Once the monarchy was restored he was paid back in part for all he had lost defending the Crown. The King also appointed him to a number of prominent offices to make up the deficit. He tried to regain his former trading position, but was unsuccessful, though his membership in the Company of Adventurers did give him some influence on the trade.

He was mentioned in Samuel Pepys' diary on 11 February 1660; 25 January, 15 and 19 February, 5 September 1662; and 22 August 1663. Pepys notes his inventiveness and mentions his proposals for a wet-dock.

He was returned to Parliament again in 1661 to represent Winchelsea until 1666. In 1665 Charles II honoured his loyal servant by creating him a baronet.

== Death and legacy ==
Crisp died on 26 February 1666 (O.S.) aged 67. He was buried in St Paul's Church, Hammersmith in a monument of black and white marble 8 feet (2.4 m) long and 2 feet (0.61 m) wide, upon which was a brass head of King Charles I, with an oval engraving:

"This Effigies was Erected by the special Appointment of Sir Nicholas Crispe, Knight and Baronet, as grateful Commemoration of that Glorious Martyr King Charles I. of blessed Memory".

Under that oval was a white pedestal upon which was inscribed:

"Within this Urne is Entomb'd the Heart of Sir Nicholas Crispe Kt. and Baronet, a Loyal Sharer in the Sufferings of his late and present Majesty. He first settled the Trade of Gold, and there Built the Castle of Cormentine. Died the 26th of February 1665. Aged 67."

In his will he directed that his monument should record that he had lost 'out of purse about a Hundred Thousand pounds' by his pioneering efforts in the Guinea trade. He was buried in the church of St Mildred, Bread Street in east London.

He was a great benefactor to the borough of Hammersmith, supporting the building of Hammersmith's first chapel, supplying both money and bricks. The memorial to Crisp was transferred to the churchyard of St Paul's by the north-east door of the church.

A horseshoe, like in his coat of arms, is now present in the coat of arms of the London Borough of Hammersmith and Fulham

Crisp was a sitter in a portrait by Robert Hartley Cromek but the date, 1795, is too late to be original, it is copied from an earlier portrait by an unknown artist.

Crisp was also responsible for building Brandenburgh House in Fulham Palace Road. Originally named the "Great House" by Crisp, this impressive residence was later the home of King George IV's estranged wife Queen Caroline. There is a Crisp Road in Hammersmith named after him.

Parliament of England
Vacant No parliaments summoned 1629–40 Title last held by Sir William Twysden, Bt; Ralph Freeman	Member of Parliament for Winchelsea; 1640–1641; With: John Finch	Succeeded by John Finch; William Smyth
Preceded by William Howard; Samuel Gott	Member of Parliament for Winchelsea; 1661–1666; With: Francis Finch	Succeeded by Francis Finch; Robert Austen
Baronetage of England
New creation	Baronet (of Hammersmith); 1665–1666	Succeeded by Nicholas Crispe
