= Robert Harry (MP for Winchelsea) =

English politician

Robert Harry (fl. 1373–1388), of Winchelsea, Sussex, was an English politician.

He was a member (MP) of the parliament of England for Winchelsea in 1373, May 1382 and Feb. 1388.
