= William Howard, 3rd Baron Howard of Escrick =

William Howard, 3rd Baron Howard of Escrick (c. 1626–1694) was an English Parliamentarian soldier, nobleman, and plotter.

== Life ==
Howard was the second son of Edward Howard, 1st Baron Howard of Escrick and Mary Butler. He matriculated at Corpus Christi College, Cambridge, in 1646, and was then admitted to Lincoln's Inn. In 1653 he was a soldier in Oliver Cromwell's life-guards, and a "great preacher" of the anabaptists, but his views were republican, and he took part in the plots of 1655–56. Committed to the Fleet Prison in 1657, he successfully petitioned Richard Cromwell for release in 1658.

In 1660 Sir Edward Hyde found him anxious to serve the king, likely to be useful among the sectaries, and surprisingly well acquainted with recent royalist negotiations. He was elected Member of Parliament for Winchelsea in the Convention Parliament. In 1674 he was discovered in secret correspondence with Holland, spent several months in the Tower of London and was set free only upon making a full confession.

Succeeding his brother Thomas Howard, 2nd Baron Howard of Escrick as Lord Howard in 1678, he sat on the lords' committees which credited Titus Oates's information, and furthered the trial of his kinsman, William Howard, 1st Viscount Stafford. In 1681 he was again sent to the Tower on the false charge made by Edward Fitzharris, of writing the True Englishman. Algernon Sidney's influence procured his release (February 1682). From then he was part of the "country party" (early Whig) opposition.

He was arrested on the first rumours of the Rye House Plot, and turned informer at the trial of William Russell, Lord Russell (July 1683). He gave accounts of meetings at John Hampden's and Russell's houses, which mainly led to Russell's conviction. His evidence similarly ruined Sidney, although Henry Booth, 1st Earl of Warrington, was fortunate in being tried by his fellow peers, who did not believe Howard's charges against him. He himself was pardoned, and died in obscurity at York in April 1694.

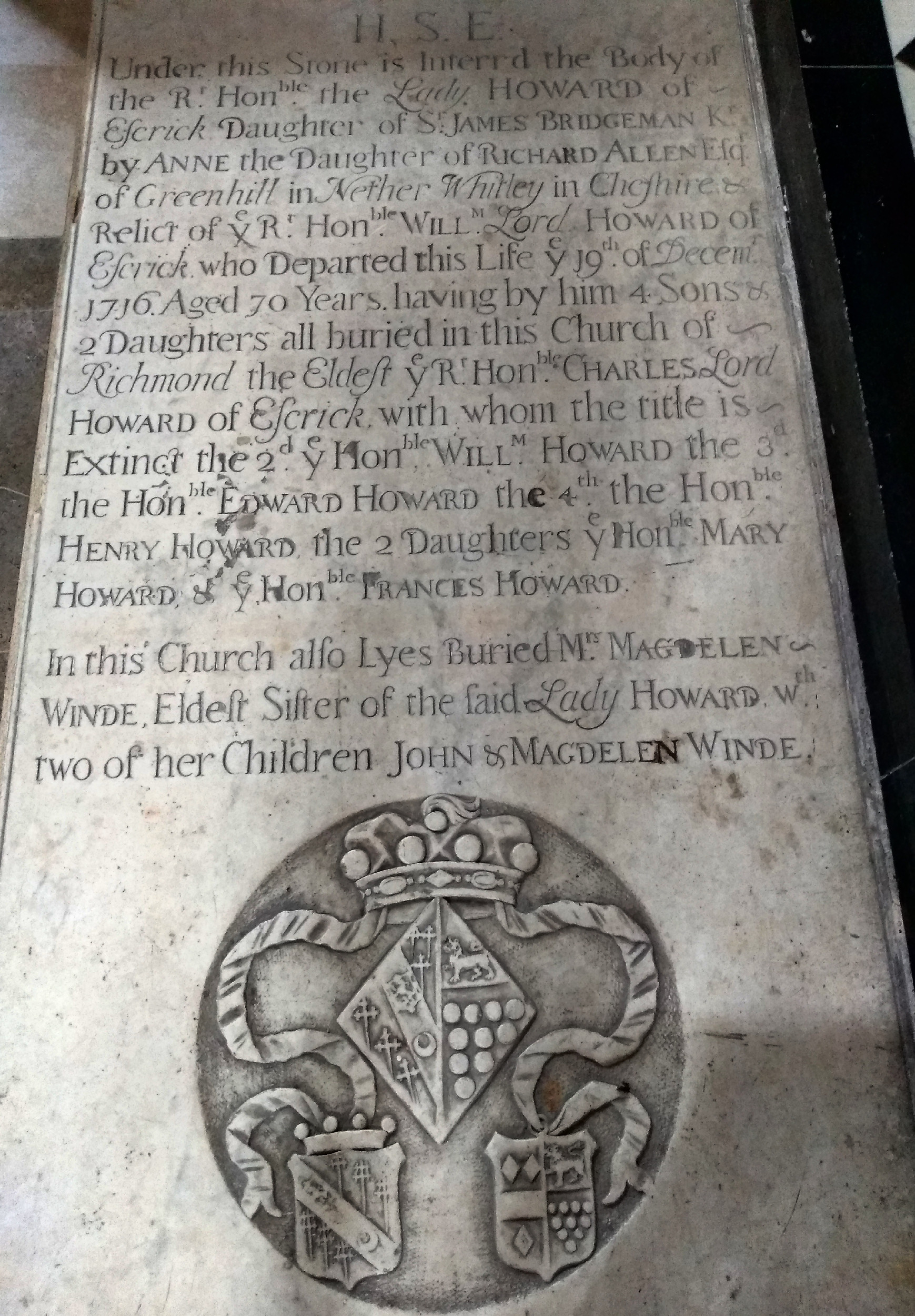
St Mary Magdalene's, Richmond, Ledger stone for Lady Howard of Escrick

By his wife Frances, daughter of Sir James Bridgman, and niece of Sir Orlando Bridgman, he had six children, including Charles, fourth baron, on whose death in 1715 the title became extinct.

He was one of the most detested and despised men of his age: John Evelyn called him "that monster of a man".

== Notes ==
Parliament of England
Vacant Not represented in the restored Rump Title last held by Robert Fowle; John Busbridge	Member of Parliament for Winchelsea; 1660–1661; With: Samuel Gott	Succeeded by Francis Finch; Sir Nicholas Crisp
Peerage of England
Preceded by Thomas Howard	Baron Howard of Escrick; 1678–1694	Succeeded by Charles Howard
