= Denis Granville =

English non-juring cleric

Denis Granville (name altered from Grenville) (13 February 1637 – 18 April 1703) was an English non-juring cleric, Dean of Durham and then Jacobite exile.

== Life ==
The youngest son of Sir Bevil Grenville, he was born 13 February 1637 and baptised at Kilkhampton, Cornwall. He matriculated as a gentleman-commoner of Exeter College, Oxford on 6 August 1658. He graduated MA in convocation 28 September 1660 and DD on 28 February 1671.

About 1660 he married Anne, fourth and youngest daughter of Bishop John Cosin. Richard Sanderson ordained him in 1661 and, on 10 July in the same year, he succeeded, on the presentation of his eldest brother, John Granville, 1st Earl of Bath, to the family living of Kilkhampton. Lord Bath also obtained for him a promise of the next vacant fellowship at Eton College. Gilbert Sheldon, Archbishop of Canterbury, resisted this arrangement, but the king sent a peremptory mandate directing that it should be fulfilled. Before the next vacancy (in 1669) Granville exchanged the reversion for the prebendal stall of Langtoft in York Cathedral, held by Timothy Thriscrosse. He was collated to the first stall in Durham Cathedral on 18 September 1662. He was appointed to the archdeaconry of Durham, with the rectory of Easington annexed, in September 1662, and in 1664 to the rectory of Elwick Hall. He resigned Elwick Hall in 1667 on his institution to the rectory of Sedgefield, and in 1668 he surrendered the first for the second stall, being installed on 16 February 1668.

With the assistance of Bishop Nathaniel Crew he obtained, in spite of Archbishop William Sancroft's opposition, the deanery of Durham, to which he was instituted on 9 December 1684. Granville then vacated his stall, but held at the same time the deanery and archdeaconry of Durham, and the rectory of Sedgefield, described in his own words as "the best deanery, the best archdeaconry, and one of the best livings in England." He managed, however, to get into debt, and while Archdeacon of Durham and one of the king's chaplains in ordinary, he was arrested within the cloisters of the cathedral and imprisoned, though claiming his privileges. The matter was brought before the king in council, when he was freed, and the offending officials were punished. His wife suffered from "occasional attacks of mental excitement"; Granville was estranged from her father and her sister, Lady Gerrard. During 1678 and 1679 he retired with his sister, Lady Joanna Thornhill and her family to Tour D'Aigues in Provence.

Granville was a High Church cleric who worked at Durham to promote a weekly service of Holy Communion in the cathedral and continue John Cosin's line; he tried to use the cathedral as a seminary to fill the canon positions. He supported James II, and on William of Orange's landing raised £700 from the prebendaries of Durham for the king, giving £100 himself. He addressed the clergy of his archdeaconry on behalf of James, and even after Durham had been surprised by William's followers (Sunday, 9 December 1688) Granville delivered a loyal sermon. At midnight on 11 December he fled to Carlisle, and a few days later was taken on the border with Scotland, and was robbed of his horses and money. They were recovered by him when he had been brought back to Carlisle, and after a short stay at Durham he succeeded in escaping to Edinburgh and landing at Honfleur (19 March 1689). His wife was left destitute, but by order of the chapter of Durham she received an allowance. His goods at Durham were distrained by the sheriff for debt; Sir George Wheler purchased the dean's library for £221. Through family influence Grenville retained the revenues of his preferment for a time; but when he declined to take the oaths of allegiance to William III and Mary II he was deprived of them from 1 February 1691.

Except in February 1690, when he came incognito into England but was recognised at Canterbury, and a second visit in April 1695, he remained in France. James nominated him for the archbishopric of York on the death of Lamplugh, and he was well treated by the ex-king's wife. Sums of money were occasionally sent to him from England, especially by Sir George Wheler and Thomas Higgons his nephew who were threatened with prosecution in 1698 by Sir George's son-in-law, an attorney with whom he had quarrelled. Granville was the most important churchman who accompanied James into exile, but was not allowed to perform the Anglican service; attempts were made to convert him to Catholicism. He lived first at Rouen, from 1698 to 1701 at Tremblay, and later at Corbeil. He fell ill at Corbeil on the night of 12 April 1703, was taken to Paris, and died on 18 April. His body was buried privately at night at the lower end of the consecrated ground of the Holy Innocents churchyard in Paris. The funeral was at the cost of Mary of Modena and attended by Dr Ralph Taylor, Anglican chaplain to the court. His wife died in October 1691, and was buried in Durham Cathedral.

== Works ==
Grenville when an undergraduate at Oxford contributed verses to the university collection of loyal poems printed in 1660, with the title of Britannia Rediviva. On his appointment to the archdeaconry of Durham in 1662 he issued and reissued in the next year Article of Enquiry concerning Matters Ecclesiastical for the officials of every parish in the diocese. In 1664 he printed a sermon and a letter, entitled "The Compleat Conformist, or Seasonable Advice concerning strict Conformity and frequent Celebration of the Holy Communion".

He addressed to his nephew Thomas Higgons, son of his sister, Bridget Grenville, by Sir Thomas Higgons, in 1685, an anonymous volume of 'Counsel and Directions, Divine and Moral, in Plain and Familiar Letters of Advice.' When in exile at Rouen he printed twenty copies of 'The Resigned and Resolved Christian and Faithful and Undaunted Royalist in two plain farewell Sermons and a loyal farewell Visitation Speech. Whereunto are added certaine letters to his relations and friends in England.' Letters from him are printed in Thomas Comber's Life of Thomas Comber, pp. 139–334. John Locke when in France in 1678 wrote three letters to Granville.

A narrative of his life was composed by a cleric named Beaumont of the Diocese of Durham. Two collections of his remains were made by the Surtees Society. George Granville, 1st Baron Lansdowne pronounced a eulogy on his virtues.

== Notes ==
Attribution

This article incorporates text from a publication now in the public domain: "Grenville, Denis". Dictionary of National Biography. London: Smith, Elder & Co. 1885–1900.
