= Robert Austen (1642–1696) =

English politician

Robert Austen (3 August 1642 – 22 August 1696) was an English politician who sat in the House of Commons in two periods between 1666 and 1696.

Austen was the son of Sir Robert Austen, 1st Baronet and his second wife. He was educated at Gray's Inn and was a colonel in the militia.

Austen was elected Member of Parliament for Winchelsea on 4 October 1666 and held the seat until 1681. In 1668 he was deputy mayor of Winchelsea and speaker of the Cinque Ports at the Guestling court.

Austen regained his seat at Winchelsea on 17 January 1689 and held it until his death aged 54 in 1696. He was Lord of the Admiralty and Commissioner for public accounts from 1691 and a Commissioner for Greenwich Hospital from 1695.

Austen married Judith Freke, daughter of Ralph Freke of Hannington Wiltshire in September 1669.

Parliament of England
Preceded by Sir Nicholas Crisp, Bt; Francis Finch	Member of Parliament for Winchelsea; 1666–1681; With: Francis Finch 1661–1678; Sir John Banks, Bt 1678; Cresheld Draper 1678–1689	Succeeded by Sir Stephen Lennard, Bt; Cresheld Draper
Preceded by The Earl of Middleton; Cresheld Draper	Member of Parliament for Winchelsea; 1689–1696; With: Samuel Western	Succeeded by Samuel Western; Sir George Chute. Bt
