= Thomas Bette =

English politician

Thomas Bette (fl. 1383–1402) was an English politician. He sat as MP for Winchelsea in October 1383, April 1384, and 1393.

Before Easter 1403, he married Petronilla. He established a business association with John Helde with whom in 1402, he prosecuted John Sly of Sarre.
