= John Hayes (1643–1705) =

English Member of Parliament

John Hayes (25 January 1643 – 22 March 1705) was an English Member of Parliament. He was a Member of Parliament (MP) for Winchelsea from 1698 to January 1701, and from November 1701 to 1702.

He died aged 62, leaving his assets to his daughter, Elizabeth St Leger née Hayes, Viscountess Doneraile, and her four children. She was the wife of Arthur St Leger, 1st Viscount Doneraile.

Parliament of England
| Preceded by Sir George Chute, Bt; Samuel Western | Member of Parliament for Winchelsea; 1698 – January 1701; With: Robert Bristow | Succeeded by Robert Bristow; Thomas Newport |
| Preceded by Robert Bristow; Thomas Newport | Member of Parliament for Winchelsea; November 1701 – 1702; With: Robert Austen | Succeeded by George Clarke; James Hayes |
