= Francis Finch (Winchelsea MP) =

English politician

Francis Finch (c. 1602 – August 1677) of Rushock, Wiltshire, was an English politician who sat in the House of Commons of England from 1661 to 1677.

He was known as a Protestant and supporter of the monarchy and was rewarded during the Restoration. Finch was a Member of Parliament (MP) for Winchelsea in the Cavalier Parliament from 1661 until his death in 1677.

Parliament of England
Preceded by William Howard; Samuel Gott	Member of Parliament for Winchelsea; 1661–1678; With: Nicholas Crisp 1661–68; Robert Austen 1668–78	Succeeded by Robert Austen; Sir John Banks, Bt
