= John Salerne (died 1410) =

English politician

Do not confuse with John Salerne (died 1415)

John Salerne (died 1410), of Winchelsea, Sussex and New Romney, Kent, was an English politician.

He was Mayor of Winchelsea for 1407–1409 and elected a member (MP) of the parliament of England for New Romney in 1386, February 1388 and 1391, and for Winchelsea in 1402 and 1407.
