= Vincent Fynch (MP 1395–1402) =

Vincent Fynch (fl. 1395 – 1402), of Icklesham and Netherfield, Sussex, was an English Member of Parliament.

He was the son of an earlier MP named Vincent Fynch, who represented Winchelsea in 1366. He had two sons, Vincent and William Fynch. He was a Member (MP) of the Parliament of England for Winchelsea in 1395, January 1397 and 1402.
