= Robert Bristow (1662–1706) =

English politician

Robert Bristow (December 1662 – 27 August 1706) was an English politician. He was a Member of Parliament (MP) for Winchelsea from 23 July 1698 to November 1701.

He died aged 43. His sons Robert (1688–1737) was also MP for Winchelsea, and a younger son John (1701–1768) was also an MP.

Parliament of England
Preceded by Sir George Chute, Bt; Samuel Western	Member of Parliament for Winchelsea; 1698–1701; With: John Hayes 1698–1701; Thomas Newport 1701	Succeeded by John Hayes; Robert Austen
