= John Bell (Winchelsea MP) =

English politician

John Bell II (by 1514 – 1543 or later), of Winchelsea, Sussex, was an English politician.

A wood exporter and privateer, he was made Mayor of Winchelsea for 1535–36 and 1541–42. He was then elected a Member of Parliament (MP) for Winchelsea in 1542.
