= Samuel Western =

English politician

Member of Parliament for Winchelsea
- In office 1689–1698

Personal details
- Born: August 3, 1652
- Died: August 20, 1699 Rivenhall, Essex, England
- Spouse: Anna Maria Finch
- Education: Gray's Inn
- Occupation: Politician
- Known for: MP for Winchelsea (1689–1698)

Samuel Western (3 August 1652 – 20 August 1699) was an English politician who sat in the House of Commons from 1689 to 1698.

== Biography ==
Western was the son of Thomas Western of Rivenhall Essex and his wife Martha Gott daughter of Samuel Gott. His father was a merchant and councillor of the city of London who had considerable interests in iron in the area of Winchelsea. Western was a member of Gray's Inn.

Western was elected Member of Parliament (MP) for Winchelsea on 17 January 1689 and held the seat until 1698. Western married Anna Maria Finch and had a family. He died of consumption at Rivenhall aged 47.

Parliament of England
Preceded by The Earl of Middleton; Cresheld Draper	Member of Parliament for Winchelsea; 1689–1698; With: Robert Austen 1689–1696; Sir George Chute 1696–1698	Succeeded by John Hayes; Robert Bristow
