= Vincent Fynch (MP 1406 and 1426) =

Vincent Fynch (died c. 1430), of Icklesham and Netherfield, Sussex, was an English Member of Parliament.

Fynch was the grandson of Vincent Fynch, MP for Winchelsea in 1366, and the son of Vincent Fynch, MP for Winchelsea between 1395 and 1402.

He was a Member (MP) of the Parliament of England for Winchelsea in 1406 and for Sussex in 1426.
