= Sir Stephen Lennard, 2nd Baronet =

English politician

Sir Stephen Lennard, 2nd Baronet (2 March 1637 – 15 December 1709) of Wickham Court, West Wickham, Kent was an English landowner and Whig politician who sat in the House of Commons of England in two periods between 1681 and 1701 and in the House of Commons of Great Britain from 1708 to 1709.

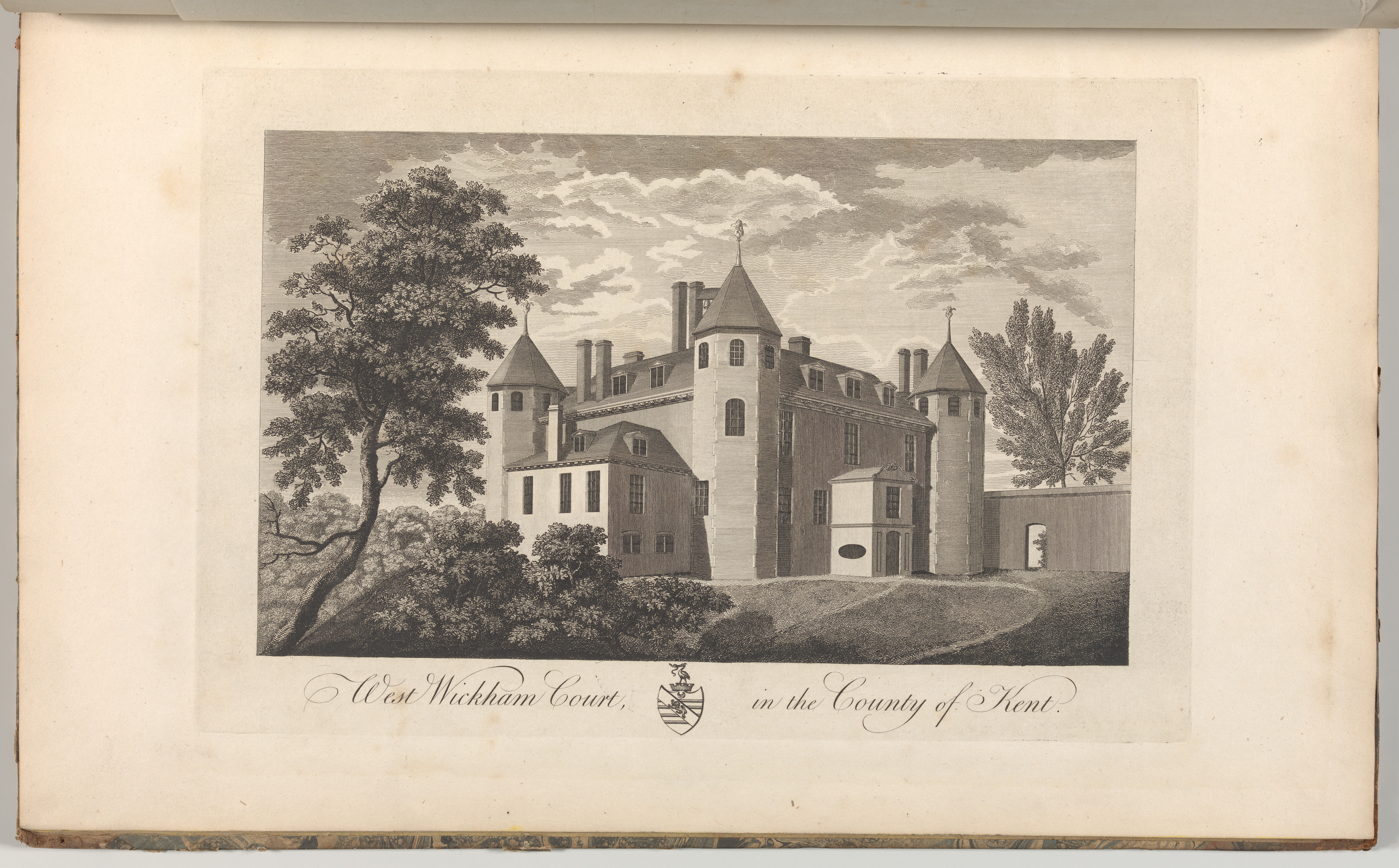
West Wickham Court, Kent

Lennard was the son of Sir Stephen Lennard, 1st Baronet of West Wickham and his third wife Anne Oglander, daughter of John Oglander of Nunwell House, Nunwell, Isle of Wight. He married Elizabeth Roy, widow of John Roy of Woodlands, Dorset, and daughter of Delalyne Hussey of Shapwick, Dorset after a settlement of 30 December 1671. He was Commissioner for assessment for Kent and Surrey from 1677 to 1680, and appointed deputy lieutenant for Kent in 1679. On 29 January 1680, he succeeded to the baronetcy on the death of his father and was subsequently appointed a JP.

Lennard was returned as Member of Parliament (MP) for Winchelsea in a contest at the 1681 English general election but took little part in proceedings. He was a colonel of the militia by 1683. He did not stand at the 1685 English general election. He was dismissed from all his local offices in February 1688 because he failed to answer the three questions, on account of 'illness'. However he was restored as JP and Colonel of a regiment of the Kent Militia in October 1688 and was Commissioner of Assessment for Kent from 1689 to 1690 and deputy lieutenant from 1689 for the rest of his life.

At the 1698 English general election, Lennard was returned unopposed as MP for Kent. He did not stand again in the 1701 elections. He was next returned for Kent again as a Whig in a contest at the 1708 British general election. He supported the naturalization of the Palatines in 1709 and, on 12 December 1709, he was added to a committee drafting a local turnpike bill. On 14 December the House of Commons voted to impeach Dr Sacheverell, and he was heard to comment that they were going 'to roast a parson'.

Lennard dropped dead of apoplexy aged 72 on 15 December 1709, the day after his comment, while walking in Drury Lane, London. He was buried at West Wickham. He had three daughters, and a son Samuel, who succeeded to the baronetcy.

Parliament of England
| Preceded by Robert Austen; Cresheld Draper | Member of Parliament for Winchelsea; 1681–1685; With: Cresheld Draper | Succeeded by The Earl of Middleton; Cresheld Draper |
| Preceded by Sir Thomas Roberts, Bt; Viscount Lisle | Member of Parliament for Kent; 1698–1701; With: Sir James Oxenden, Bt | Succeeded by Sir Thomas Hales, Bt; Thomas Meredith |
Parliament of Great Britain
| Preceded by Sir Cholmeley Dering, Bt; Viscount Villiers | Member of Parliament for Kent; 1708–1710; With: Sir Thomas Palmer, Bt | Succeeded by Sir Thomas Palmer, Bt; David Polhill |
Baronetage of England
| Preceded by Stephen Lennard | Baronet (of West Wickham); 1680–1709 | Succeeded by Samuel Lennard |
