= John Greenford =

15th-century English politician

John Greenford was an English Member of Parliament for Winchelsea 1449–1450.
