= Roger atte Gate =

English politician

Roger atte Gate (fl. 1399–1443) was an English politician. He sat as MP for Winchelsea in 1399, 1410, May 1413, November 1414, 1420, December 1421, 1422 and 1427.

He also served as Cinque Ports' bailiff at Yarmouth from September till November 1403 and from sometime until 1431, mayor of Winchelsea from Easter 1409 till 1411, 1415 till 1416, 1418 till 1419, 1430 till 1431, deputy mayor in June 1434 and jurat in 1431 till 1443.

He was probably the son of William atte Gate. Before 1415, he married Isabel.
