= Alexander Beuley =

English politician

Alexander Beuley (fl. 1421–1426) was an English politician. He sat as MP for Winchelsea in December 1421, 1425, and 1426.

In May 1421, he became feoffee of land at Pevensey belonging to the privateer William Morfote.
