= List of mayors of Winchelsea =

Winchelsea is an historic town in East Sussex, England. There has been a Mayor of Winchelsea since Edward I granted the town the right to its own Mayor and Corporation around 1292. Records of the Mayors exist since 1295. Since the Mayor has been elected annually on Easter Monday by the Freemen of the Town at an "Hundred".

The corporation lost its remaining civil and judicial powers in 1886 but was preserved as a charity by an Act of Parliament in order to maintain the membership of the Cinque Port Confederation. The mayor and corporation in Winchelsea now have a largely ceremonial role, together with responsibility for the ongoing care and maintenance of the main listed ancient monuments in the town and the Winchelsea museum.

Past Mayors of Winchelsea include:

- John Salerne 1407-09 MP for Winchelsea, 1402 and 1407 and Romney, 1386, 1388 and 1391.
- Robert Sparrow 1501, 1511, 1517 and 1524 MP for Winchelsea, 1510, ?1512, ?1515 and 1523
- Thomas Ashburnham 1509-10 and 1521-2.
- George Lowys 1525, 1531, 1536, 1537, 1551 MP for Winchelsea, 1529 and ?1536
- William Oxenbridge 1549-50.
- John Bell 1535 and 1541 MP for Winchelsea, 1541
- Frederick Andrew Inderwick 1892-93, 1902-03
- Dr John Rutherford Skinner 1900–01
- Robert Curteis Stileman 1901-02

== 21st century ==
- 2005–06 John Dunk
- 2006–07 John Gooders
- 2007–08 Alan McKinna
- 2008–09 Anthony Moore
- 2009–10 Graham Alexander
- 2010–11 Mike Melvin
- 2012–13 Roger Neaves
- 2014–15 Stephen Turner
- 2015–16 John Spencer
- 2016–17 John Spencer
- 2017–18 Cynthia Feast
- 2018–19 John Rodley
- 2019–20 John Rodley
