= Edward Howard, 1st Baron Howard of Escrick =

English nobleman and Parliamentarian

Edward Howard, 1st Baron Howard of Escrick (died 24 April 1675) was an English nobleman and Parliamentarian.

Howard was the youngest son of Thomas Howard, 1st Earl of Suffolk. He was knighted KB in 1616, when Charles became Prince of Wales. In 1624 he was elected Member of Parliament for Calne and for Wallingford and chose to sit for Calne. On the death of his father in 1626, he inherited an estate in Tollesbury, Essex. He was elected MP for Hertford in 1628 but created Baron Howard of Escrick on 12 April 1628.

Howard was one of the twelve peers who signed a petition in August 1640, opposing Charles I's expedition into Scotland. In May 1641 he was one of 10 peers selected to serve on a committee to investigate the first Army Plot. He was very active in the early parts of the English Civil War. He was one of the ten Lords selected to attend the Westminster Assembly of Divines along with 20 Commoners as lay assessor, and was often employed in negotiations with Scottish officials. However, he was left off the Committee of Both Kingdoms and generally seems to play less of a role in the coming years.

After the abolition of the House of Lords in 1649, he sat in the Commons as member for Carlisle and served on the council of state. In 1651 he was expelled from parliament for corruption. He sold Escrick in 1668.

Howard married Mary Butler, daughter of John Boteler and Elizabeth Villiers, at York House on 30 November 1623. His wife's mother was the half-sister of George Villiers, 1st Duke of Buckingham, to whom Howard was deemed to have owed his elevation to the peerage. They had two sons and one daughter, Thomas, 2nd Baron Howard of Escrick, who married Elizabeth Mordaunt, daughter of John Mordaunt, 1st Earl of Peterborough, and William Howard, 3rd Baron Howard of Escrick, notorious both as a rebel and as an informer and double agent. Their daughter Ann married Charles Howard 1st Earl of Carlisle who was a Parliamentarian.

Parliament of England
Preceded by John Duckett; John Pym	Member of Parliament for Calne; 1624–1625; With: John Duckett 1624; George Lowe 1625	Succeeded by George Lowe; Sir John Eyres
Preceded by Sir William Harrington; Sir Capell Bedell	Member of Parliament for Hertford; 1628; With: Sir Thomas Fanshawe	Succeeded by Sir Charles Morrison; Sir Thomas Fanshawe
Preceded by Thomas Cholmley	Member of Parliament for Carlisle; 1649–1651	Succeeded by Unrepresented in the Barebones Parliament
Peerage of England
New creation	Baron Howard of Escrick; 1628–1675	Succeeded by Thomas Howard
