= Ellis Crispe =

English merchant and official (1562–1625)

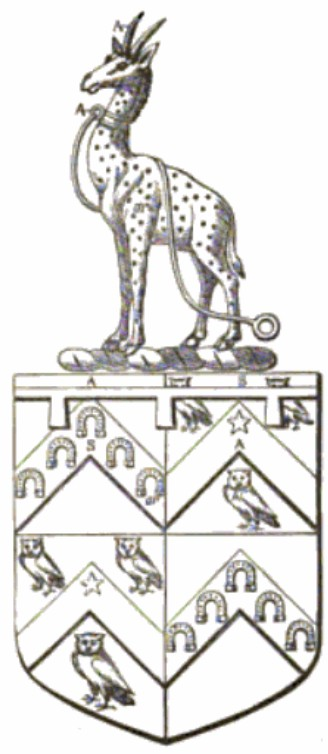
- Arms of the Crispe family of Bread Street
- Born: 1562; Marshfield, Gloucestershire
- Died: 1625 (aged 62–63)
- Occupation: Merchant
- Spouse: Hester (née Ireland)
- Children: 8
- Parent(s): Thomas Crispe, Elizabeth (née Steward)

Ellis Crispe (1562–1625) was a merchant, alderman and Sheriff of London.

== Early life ==
He was born in Marshfield, Gloucestershire the son of Thomas Crispe and Elizabeth Steward. He was baptised on 23 May 1562. He was married to Hester (née Ireland) and had eight sons including Nicholas, Samuel and Tobias and three daughters, including Elizabeth.

== Career ==
He had house in Bread Street and was a member of the Salters Company. He has been described as 'one of the richest merchants in Jacobean London'. An investigation by the alum Commissioners found that around 1609, Crispe, his son Nicholas, and others, had produced deceptive accounts of the amount of alum produced by them in Yorkshire. This resulted in a case in the Court of Exchequer. The dispute was settled by agreement the following year.

Crispe was a substantial investor in the East India Company. When the company received a revised charter from James I in 1609 , Crispe and his son Nicholas were among the named company members. In 1617, Crispe had bought a further £400 worth of stock in the company from William Temple, a transaction that Sir Alexander Temple claimed to be fraudulent. There was a second dispute between them a few years later concerning £600 of East India Company's stock which Crispe said stock had been conveyed to Temple without the knowledge of the Company's Court. The company's records show that in 1621 Crispe transferred £666 of stock to his son, Nicholas.

Along with his brother, Crispe paid for the alms houses in his home town of Marshfield. In 1624, a sermon by Thomas Gataker was dedicated to Crispe and his brother, Nicholas. Crispe was made an alderman of the City of London in 1625.

== Death ==
He died on 3 November 1625 shortly after being elected Sheriff and is buried in St Mildred, Bread Street. His lengthy will was proved on 7 November 1625 at the Prerogative Court of Canterbury. In his will, he made bequests to the poor of Bread Street, the town of Marshfield and the Officers of the Salters' Company.

Crispe's widow, Hester, subsequently married Walter Pye.
