= Richard Berkeley (Sussex MP) =

English politician

Richard Berkeley (by 1465 – 1513 or later) was an English politician.

He was a member (MP) of the parliament of England for Winchelsea in 1495 and 1497, and for Rye in 1504 and 1510.
