= Cresheld Draper =

English politician

Cresheld Draper (8 November 1646 – 15 March 1694) was an English politician who sat in the House of Commons from 1678 to 1689.

Draper was the son of William Draper of May Place Crayford and his wife Mary Cresheld daughter of Richard Cresheld, sergeant at law. His father died when Draper was four, leaving him the manors and estates at Crayford. Draper's mother remarried to John Egioke (c. 1616–1663) of Shurnock Court, Worcestershire.

Here in Crayford Church, lieth interred the remains of William Draper of Crayford in the county of Kent Esq. who departed this life January 1650; and of Mary his wife the 4th and youngest daughter of Richard Chresheld Sarjant at Law and One of the Late King's Justices of the Common Pleas who after she had borne to her said husband one only son Cresheld and two daughters Mary and another still borne finished her course September 1652.

Draper was elected Member of Parliament (MP) for Winchelsea on petition on 7 February 1678 after complaining of an undue Return of John Banks and held the seat until 1689. In 1685 he was Baron of the Cinque Ports for the coronation of King James II.

Draper held the rank of colonel. He died at the age of 47 and his heirs sold his properties at Crayford to Sir Cloudesley Shovel.

Draper married Sarah Gauden, daughter of Denis Gauden of Clapham, Surrey in around 1666.

Parliament of England
| Preceded by Robert Austen; Sir John Banks | Member of Parliament for Winchelsea; 1678 – 1689; With: Robert Austen to 1681; Sir Stephen Lennard 1681–85; The Earl of Middleton 1685–89 | Succeeded by Robert Austen; Samuel Western |
