= Thomas Ashburnham (MP) =

16th-century English politician

Thomas Ashburnham (by 1462 – 1523), of Guestling and Winchelsea, Sussex and London, was an English politician.

His son was John Ashburnham, also an MP for Winchelsea.

Ashburnham was Mayor of Winchelsea in 1509–1510 and 1521–1522. He was a Member of Parliament (MP) for Winchelsea in 1510 and 1523.
