= Crisp baronets =

Baronetcy in the Baronetage of the United Kingdom

- Escutcheon of the Crisp baronets of Bungay
- Creation date: 1913
- Status: extant
- Motto: Res non verba, Deeds not words

The Crisp Baronetcy, of Bungay in the County of Suffolk, is a title in the Baronetage of the United Kingdom, created on 5 February 1913 for lawyer and microscopist Sir Frank Crisp.

== Crip baronets, of Bungay (1913) ==
- Sir Frank Crisp, 1st Baronet (1843–1919)
- Sir Frank Morris Crisp, 2nd Baronet (1872–1938)
- Sir John Wilson Crisp, 3rd Baronet (1873–1950)
- Sir John Peter Crisp, 4th Baronet (1925–2005)
- Sir John Charles Crisp, 5th Baronet (born 1955)

The heir presumptive is the current baronet's brother, Michael Peter Crisp (born 1957). His heir apparent is his eldest son Alexander Samuel Crisp (born 1990).

== See also ==
- Crispe baronets of Hammersmith

== Notes ==
Baronetage of the United Kingdom
Preceded by Levy baronets	Crisp baronets of Bungay; 5 February 1913	Succeeded by Runchorelal baronets
