= Guinea Company (London) =

Company founded to trade in Africa for profit

The Company of Adventurers of London Trading to the Ports of Africa, more commonly known as "the Guinea Company", was a private joint stock company founded to trade in Africa for profit. It was a trading company trading in slaves, and redwood (used for dyes) from the western Africa (today parts of Guinea and Sierra Leone). At its height, the Guinea Company owned and operated fifteen cargo ships.

== History ==
King James I in 1618 granted the company a 31-year monopoly on the exportation of goods from West Africa to be imported into England. In 1624 Parliament declared The Guinea Company's monopoly a grievance, despite the company suffering from financial difficulties. However, it was not until seven years after being founded and a year after parliament's opposition when Nicholas Crispe became the principal organizer and profiteer in 1625. With this newfound success, it also brought along a more resounding impression of objection from England. The Guinea Company had a great deal of growth with Nicholas Crispe, who had become the controlling stock holder in 1628.

Nicholas Crispe got most of his royal support through the building of trading forts on the Gold Coast of Komenda and Kormantin. The king, James I, saw them as a great value to future of England–Africa trade.

The Guinea Company had touched on many different trades, one of which was gold, which in the beginning was its primary objective. Between 1618 and 1621, three expeditions were made up the Gambia River to collect gold. No profits were made, and after the third trip the company accumulated a loss of £5,600, which was a great deal of money during this era as Nicholas Crispe had purchased the majority of the company's shares for less than £800. After Crispe had failed in leading the company in finding gold along the Gambia River, it resorted to the collection of redwood from Sierra Leone as its main export.

In 1631 a new charter was formed and granted to the "Company of Merchants Trading to Guinea". Like the first charter in 1618, this too was for 31 years, but it was from Cape Blanco to the Cape of Good Hope. While it may seem to outsiders as a completely new trading company, it was not. Much of the members were in fact associated with The Guinea Company, including Nicholas Crispe. By creating a new name for themselves, it gave them more opportunities in expanding their industry, particularly in the Eastern part of Sierra Leone as a means for gathering gold. In 1632 gold factories (trading posts) were made in Komenda, Kormantin, and Winneba. Up until the year 1650, three additional factories followed: Anomabu, Takoradi, and Cabo Corso. Along with gold as the main source of income, ships were sent east to Benin to retrieve cloth where it would be brought back and sold for gold. It is estimated that Nicholas Crispe and his company made a profit of over £500,000 through the gold they had collected within the 11–12 years after 1632.

In 1640, Nicholas Crispe and his trading company had once again been put under political pressure from England. In 1640, parliament ordered him to give up his monopoly on Guinea. And it was in 1644 when his of the company were taken away, and the company was later handed on to merchants who supported the parliament.

The achievements of the Guinea trade company have for the most part been unappreciated and gone unacknowledged. They played a significant role in the history of trade and development all along the west coast of Africa. As well as bringing in England into the gold trade through the Gold Coast.

According to British parliamentary records, the company also appears to have been involved in the trade of enslaved Africans.

== See also ==
- List of trading companies
