= Tobias Crisp =

English clergyman and reputed antinomian

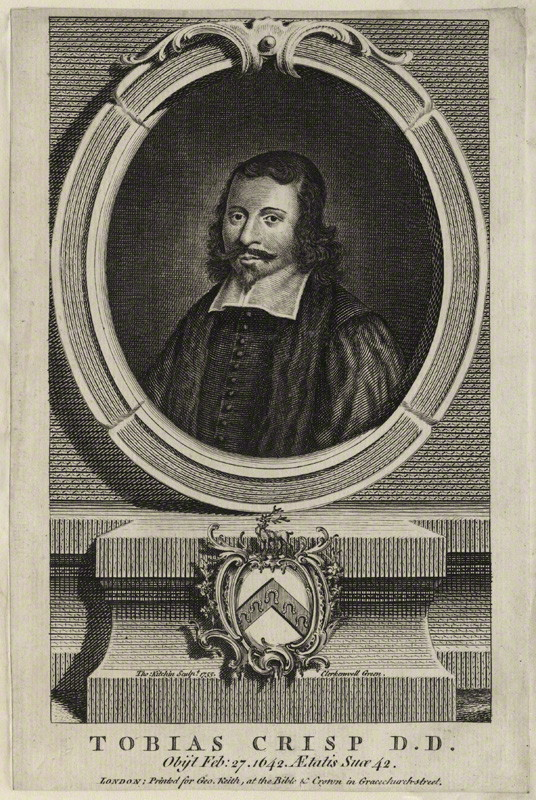

Tobias Crisp D.D. (1600 – 1643) was an English clergyman and reputed antinomian. In the end he proved a divisive figure for English Calvinists, with a serious controversy arising from the republication of his works in the 1690s.

== Life ==
In 1600, Tobias Crisp was born in Bread Street, London. His elder brother was Sir Nicholas Crispe. Tobias was the third son of Ellis Crisp (deceased 1625), a former sheriff of London. Tobias matriculated at Eton College, moved to Christ's College, Cambridge, remained in Cambridge and took his B.A. He removed to Balliol College, Oxford and graduated with an M.A. in 1626. About this time, he married Mary, daughter of London merchant, M.P. and future member of the council of state Rowland Wilson. Tobias and Mary would have thirteen children.

In 1627, he was presented to the rectory of Newington Butts. A few months later, Tobias was removed for being party to a simoniacal (i.e., the sale of a clerical office) contract. Later that year, he was presented to the rectory of Brinkworth in Wiltshire. There, he became a popular preacher and host. At an unknown date, Tobias obtained his Doctor of Divinity degree (D.D.). In 1642, persecuted by royalist soldiers, Tobias felt compelled to leave his rectory.

He retired to London in August 1642. While at Brinkworth, Tobias had been suspected of antinomianism, and as soon as his opinions became known from his preaching in London, his theories on the doctrine of free grace were bitterly attacked. Towards the close of this year he held a controversy on this subject with fifty-two opponents. He died of smallpox on 27 February 1643, and was buried in St. Mildred's Church, Bread Street.

== Works ==
After his death his discourses were published by Robert Lancaster under the title Christ alone Exalted, in editions from 1643. In 1690 his Works were republished with additions by one of his sons, and again in 1755 by John Gill, minister of Carter Lane Baptist Chapel, near Tooley Street.

== Alleged Antinomianism ==
It is disputed whether or not Crisp was actually an Antinomian. Dr. Chris Caughey argues that Crisp did not deny the Third Use of the Law, and thus was not an Antinomian. Bob McKelvey wrote for the Alliance of Confessing Evangelicals,

"Crisp did indeed set forth teachings that while not strictly antinomian, contributed to such tendencies and prompted such accusations... Was Crisp a bad-guy antinomian? Not strictly. Still, his doctrine of salvation possessed antinomian leanings and fell outside the bounds Reformed orthodoxy, especially as set forth in the Westminster Standards a in the years following his death."

Others, however, have continued to label Crisp as an Antinomian. Robert Rix, for example, reiterates his title as the 'Great Champion of Antinomianism.'
