= George Lowys =

16th-century English politician

George Lowys (by 1500 – 1553/54) was the Mayor of Winchelsea and Member of Parliament for Winchelsea, Sussex.

He was made mayor of Winchelsea for 1525–27, 1531–1534, 1536, 1537–38, 1551–52 and then elected Member of Parliament for Winchelsea in 1529 and possibly again in 1536.

He married Dorothy and had two sons.
