= Edward Drummond (disambiguation) =

Edward Drummond (1792–1843) was a murdered British civil servant.

Edward Drummond may also refer to:

- Edward Drummond, 6th Duke of Perth (died 1760), titular 9th Earl of Perth, 1st Duke's 3rd son
- Eddie Drummond (born 1980), American football wide receiver

== See also ==
- Edward Hay-Drummond (1758–1829), fifth son of Robert Hay Drummond, Archbishop of York (1761–1776)
