= Robert Arnold (MP) =

Member of the Parliament of England

Robert Arnold (died circa 1408) was an English politician who was MP for Winchelsea in January 1377 and 1393. He was also mayor of Winchelsea and deputy butler for Winchelsea and Rye.
