= Sir George Chute, 1st Baronet =

English politician

Chute baronets
- Escutcheon of the Chute baronets of Hinxhill Place
- Creation date: 1684
- Status: extinct
- Extinction date: 1721/2

Sir George Chute, 1st Baronet (10 February 1665 – 4 February 1722), of Hinxhill Place, in the County of Kent, was an English politician. He was a Member of Parliament (MP) for Winchelsea from 1696 to 1698. He was made a baronet, of Hinxhill Place in the County of Kent, on 17 September 1684. The title became extinct on his death in February 1722, aged 56.

Parliament of England
Preceded by Robert Austen; Samuel Western	Member of Parliament for Winchelsea; 1696–1698; With: Samuel Western	Succeeded by John Hayes; Robert Bristow
Baronetage of England
New creation	Baronet (of Hinxhill Place); 1684–1722	Extinct
