= John More (by 1506 – 1581) =

English politician

John More (1506? – 19 January 1581), of Cannon Row, Westminster, Middlesex and Crabbet, Worth, Sussex, was an English politician. He was a member of parliament (MP) for Winchelsea in 1547.
