= Cyriak Petyt =

16th-century English politician

Cyriak Petyt (by 1517 – buried 1591), of Boughton under Blean, Kent, was an English politician.

He was a member (MP) of the parliament of England for Winchelsea in April 1554 and Chippenham in November 1554.
