= Winchelsea (constituency) =

Parliamentary constituency in the United Kingdom, 1801–1832

- Former cinque Port constituency for the House of Commons

1366–1832
- Seats: Two

Winchelsea was a parliamentary constituency in Sussex, which elected two Members of Parliament (MPs) to the House of Commons from 1366 until 1832, when it was abolished by the Great Reform Act.

== History ==
=== Boundaries ===
Winchelsea was a Cinque Port, rather than a parliamentary borough, but the difference was purely a nominal one, and it was considered an egregious example of a rotten borough. The constituency consisted of the town and parish of Winchelsea, once a market town and port but by the 19th century much reduced in importance, a mile-and-a-half inland with its harbour destroyed. In 1831, the population of the constituency was estimated at 772, and the town contained 148 houses.

=== History of corruption ===
The right to vote was exercised by the freemen of the town, of whom by 1831 there were just 11, even though in theory the custom was that every son of a freeman and every freeholder in the town was entitled to his freedom. With so few voters, bribery was the rule rather than the exception, though occasionally it became so blatant that the authorities were able to take steps against it. In 1700 an election at Winchelsea was declared void, an agent of one of the candidates arrested for bribery by order of the House of Commons, and the representation of the borough suspended until the end of the session. At another controversial election in 1712, the Commons committee which investigated was told that voters had been bribed with £30 each to vote for the sitting MPs, and their female connections received additional payments of half a guinea (10s. 6d.) each.

Nor was the expense confined to bribing the voters. Oldfield records that in 1811, with only 11 voters to poll, the Mayor demanded – and received – a fee of £200 for his services as returning officer. However, he presumably carried out his duties more satisfactorily than his predecessor in 1624, who was "brought to the bar [of the House of Commons], and on his knees severely reprimanded, and sentenced to be committed to prison" for threatening some of the voters and corruptly excluding some others from casting their votes.

Almost as troublesome was the election of 1667, when it was alleged that the Mayor had not taken the sacrament – being a communicating member of the Church of England was then a requirement for holding civic office – and that therefore the election he had conducted was void. The committee agreed, and proposed a motion that the MP who had been returned was not duly elected, but the whole House voted it down, and the election was allowed to stand. In 1702, again, the Mayor was taken into custody for corrupt practices, and expelled from all his offices in the Customs by resolution of the Commons, against the opposition of government ministers, in whose interests the corruption had been executed.

=== Patronage ===
Winchelsea affords an unusual instance of a sitting MP wresting control of a pocket borough from its "patrons", so as to be able to be sure of securing re-election on his own account. In the first half of the 18th century, Winchelsea was a "treasury borough", that is one where the influence of the government was so strong that ministers were able to consider themselves the patrons and were sure of the power to choose both MPs. In 1754, however, one of the government candidates was an Irishman named Arnold Nesbitt. Once elected, Nesbitt began to buy houses in Winchelsea so as to secure influence over the freemen, and was so far successful that by the time of the next election it was accepted that he had the absolute command of one of the seats; indeed, when he stood well with the Treasury he was also allowed to nominate for the other. For the rest of his life he successfully defended his control of Winchelsea from the free-spending of the Treasury's agents; on one occasion, it appears that the town clerk was directing the government campaign and finding himself needing more funds for the purpose than had been provided pawned the town's charters and civic regalia.

However, in 1779 Nesbitt died £100,000 in debt, and the Court of Chancery made a decree to auction his property for the relief of his creditors, but his nephew anticipating this managed to sell the Nesbitt interest in the borough back to the government's supporters (in the person of The Earl of Darlington) for the very considerable sum of £15,000, shortly before the court's decree came into force. Ministers were free once more to consider both seats at the ministry's disposal. However, Oldfield notes that Nesbitt's power in the borough was one of influence rather than of any direct property in the votes (as might have been the case in a burgage borough where the right to vote could literally be bought and sold) – and that whatever the bargain between Nesbitt's nephew and Darlington, the voters themselves were not a party to it and had still to be persuaded to co-operate. Therefore, what was sold, in effect, was the unhindered right to bribe the voters without interference, the customary price by this time being apparently £100 per vote.

=== Abolition ===
Winchelsea was abolished as a separate constituency by the Reform Act, but the nearby Cinque Port of Rye retained one of its two MPs, and Rye's parliamentary boundaries were extended to include Winchelsea from 1832.

== Members of Parliament ==
=== 1366–1640 ===
Parliament	First Member	Second Member
1366	Vincent Fynch (I)	
1373	Robert Harry I	
1377	Robert Arnold	
1378	Roger Dover	William Skele I
1381	William Skele I	
1382 (May)	Robert Harry I	
1382 (Oct)	Henry Sely	
1383 (Feb)	John Pulham	William Skele I
1383 (Oct)	John Pulham	
1384 (Apr)	William Skele I	
1385	John Pulham	
1386	William Skele I	John Pulham
1388 (Feb)	William Skele I	John Pulham or Robert Harry I
1388 (Sep)	Henry Sely	Matthew Goldyve
1390 (Jan)	William Skele I	Roger Dover
1390 (Nov)		
1391	William Skele I	Vincent Ewell
1393	Robert Arnold	Thomas Bette
1394		
1395	Vincent Fynch (II)	William Skele II
1397 (Jan)	Vincent Fynch (II)	John Helde
1397 (Sep)		
1399	Roger atte Gate	William Skele II
1401		
1402	Vincent Fynch (II)	John Salerne II
1403	Walter Young	
1404 (Jan)		
1404 (Oct)		
1406	Vincent Fynch (III)	John Worton
1407	John Salerne II	Robert Fishlake
1410	Roger atte Gate	John Tunstall
1411		
1413 (Feb)		
1413 (May)	Roger atte Gate	Thomas Young
1414 (Apr)		
1414 (Nov)	Roger atte Gate	William Catton
1415		
1416 (Mar)		
1416 (Oct)		
1417	John French	William Catton
1419	John French	John Tamwroth
1420	Edward Hopyere	Roger atte Gate
1421 (May)	Thomas Thunder	William Catton
1421 (Dec)	Alexander Beuley	Roger atte Gate
1425	Thomas Young	
1426	Vincent Fynch (III)	
1449–1450	John Greenford	
1495	Richard Barkeley	
1497	Richard Barkeley	
1510	Thomas Ashburnham	Robert Sparrow
1512	?John Ashburnham I	?Robert Sparrow
1515	?John Ashburnham I	?Robert Sparrow
1523	Thomas Ashburnham	Robert Sparrow
1529	Thomas Ensing	George Lowys
1536	?Thomas Ensing	?George Lowys
1539	not known	
1542	John Bell	Philip Chute
1545	Philip Chute	Thomas Hynxstend
1547	John Rowland	John More
1553 (Mar)	William Egleston	Michael Blount
1553 (Oct)	Sir Henry Crispe	William Roper
1554 (Apr)	Cyriak Petyt	Joseph Beverleey
1554 (Nov)	William Egleston	John Cheyne II
1555	Thomas Smith	John Peyton
1558	Sir George Howard	John Fowler
1559	Goddard White	Henry Fane
1562–3	Richard Chambers	Henry Fane
1566	Henry Cobham replaced ?Chambers, ?deceased	
1571	Thomas Wilford	Robert Eyre
1572	Thomas Wilford	Richard Barry
1584	Giles Fletcher	Herbert Pelham
1586	Adam Moyle	Thomas Egleston
1588–9	Adam Moyle	Herbert Morley
1593	Adam Ashburnham	Ashburnham Pecke
1597	Ralph Ewens	Thomas Colepeper
1601	Moyle Finch	Hugh Beeston
1604	Adam White	Thomas Unton
1614	William Binge	Thomas Godfrey
1621	Thomas Finch	Edward Nicholas
1624	John Finch	Edward Nicholas
1625	Roger Twysden	Sir Ralph Freeman
1626	Roger Twysden	Sir Nicholas Saunders
1628	Sir William Twysden	Sir Ralph Freeman
1629–1640	No parliaments summoned	

=== MPs 1640–1832 ===
Year	First member	First party	Second member	Second party
April 1640	Nicholas Crisp	Royalist	John Finch	
November 1640	Nicholas Crisp	Royalist	John Finch	Parliamentarian
1641	William Smith	Royalist	John Finch	Parliamentarian
September 1642	William Smith	Royalist	Finch died – seat left vacant	
January 1644	Smith disabled from sitting – seat vacant		Finch died – seat left vacant	
1645	Henry Oxenden		Samuel Gott	
December 1648	Oxenden and Gott excluded in Pride's Purge – both seats vacant			
1653	Winchelsea was unrepresented in the Barebones Parliament and the First and Second Parliaments of the Protectorate			
January 1659	John Busbridge		Robert Fowle	
May 1659	Not represented in the restored Rump			
April 1660	William Howard		Samuel Gott	
1661	Sir Nicholas Crisp		Francis Finch	
1666	Robert Austen		Francis Finch	
February 1678	Robert Austen		Sir John Banks	
March 1678	Robert Austen		Cresheld Draper	
1681	Sir Stephen Lennard		Cresheld Draper	
1685	The Earl of Middleton		Cresheld Draper	
1689	Robert Austen		Samuel Western	
1696	Sir George Chute		Samuel Western	
1698	John Hayes		Robert Bristow I	
January 1701	Thomas Newport		Robert Bristow I	
November 1701	John Hayes		Robert Austen	
1702	George Clarke		James Hayes	
1705	George Dodington		James Hayes	
May 1708	George Dodington		Sir Francis Dashwood	
December 1708	Robert Bristow II		Sir Francis Dashwood	
1713	Robert Bristow II		George Dodington	
1715	Robert Bristow II		George Bubb	
1722	Robert Bristow II		Thomas Townshend	
1727	Robert Bristow II		John Scrope	
February 1728	Robert Bristow II		Sir Archer Croft	
April 1728	Robert Bristow II		Peter Walter	
1734	Robert Bristow II		Edmund Hungate Beaghan	
1738	Robert Bristow III		Edmund Hungate Beaghan	
1741	The Viscount Doneraile		Thomas Orby Hunter	
1747	Lieutenant Colonel John Mordaunt		Thomas Orby Hunter	
1754	Arnold Nesbitt		Thomas Orby Hunter	
1759	Arnold Nesbitt		Lieutenant Colonel George Gray	
1760	Arnold Nesbitt		Thomas Orby Hunter	
March 1761	The Earl of Thomond		Thomas Orby Hunter	
December 1761	(Sir) Thomas Sewell		Thomas Orby Hunter	
1768	The Earl of Thomond		Thomas Orby Hunter	
1770	The Earl of Thomond		Arnold Nesbitt	
August 1774	William Nedham		Arnold Nesbitt	
October 1774	Charles Wolfran Cornwall		Arnold Nesbitt	
1775	Charles Wolfran Cornwall		William Nedham	
1780	Charles Wolfran Cornwall		John Nesbitt	
1784	William Nedham		John Nesbitt	
1790	Viscount Barnard		Richard Barwell	
1792	Sir Frederick Fletcher-Vane		Richard Barwell	
1794	John Hiley Addington	Tory	Richard Barwell	
May 1796	William Currie		Richard Barwell	
December 1796	William Currie		William Devaynes	
1802	Robert Ladbroke	Whig	William Moffat	Whig
1806	Sir Frederick Fletcher-Vane	Whig	Calverley Bewicke	Whig
1807	Sir Oswald Mosley	Whig	Calverley Bewicke	Whig
1812	William Vane	Whig	Calverley Bewicke	Whig
1815	Henry Brougham	Whig	Calverley Bewicke	Whig
1816	Henry Brougham	Whig	Viscount Barnard	Whig
1818	Henry Brougham	Whig	George Galway Mills	Whig
1820	Henry Brougham	Whig	Lucius Concannon	Whig
1823	Henry Brougham	Whig	William Leader	Whig
1826	Henry Brougham	Whig	Viscount Howick	Whig
February 1830	John Williams	Whig	Viscount Howick	Whig
July 1830	John Williams	Whig	Henry Dundas	Tory
April 1831	John Williams	Whig	Stephen Lushington	Whig
July 1831	John Williams	Whig	James Brougham	Whig
1832	Constituency abolished			
