= Thomas Ensing =

16th-century English politician

Thomas Ensing (by 1490 – ca. 1539), of Winchelsea, Sussex, was an English politician. He was a Member of Parliament (MP) for Winchelsea in 1529 and 1536.
