= Netherfield, East Sussex =

Village in East Sussex, England

Coordinates: 50.942°N 0.432°E

Netherfield
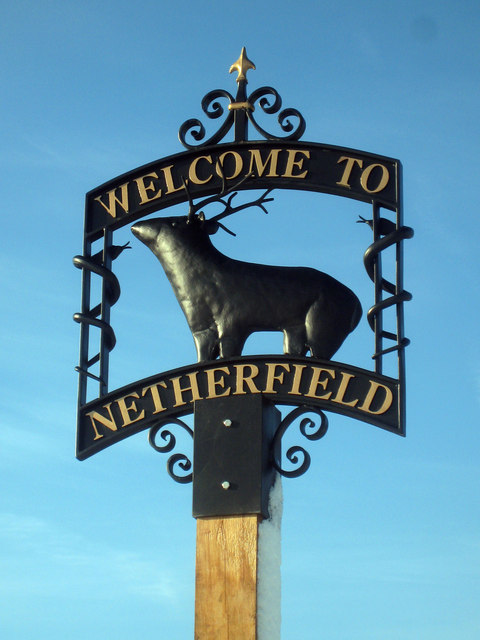
- Welcome to Netherfield with reindeer inside

- Location within East Sussex
- Area: 12.8 km^{2} (4.9 sq mi)
- Population: 500 (1870-1872 Imperial Gazetteer of England and Wales)
  - Density: 39/km^{2} (100/sq mi)
- OS grid reference: TQ724172
  - London: 47 miles (76 km) N
- Civil parish: Battle
- District: Rother
- Shire county: East Sussex
- Region: South East
- Country: England
- Sovereign state: United Kingdom
- Post town: BATTLE
- Postcode district: TN33
- Dialling code: 01424
- UK Parliament: Bexhill and Battle
- Website: Netherfield Village

Netherfield is a village in the civil parish of Battle, in the Rother district, in the county of East Sussex, England.

In the 1870-1872 Imperial Gazetteer of England and Wales, Netherfield was described as a hamlet and chapelry with a population of 500.

The Church of St John the Baptist was built in 1860 and is grade II* listed. Its architect was Samuel Sanders Teulon. The village has a primary school, and there are two pubs in the village. Several buildings are grade II listed including the school and the former rectory.

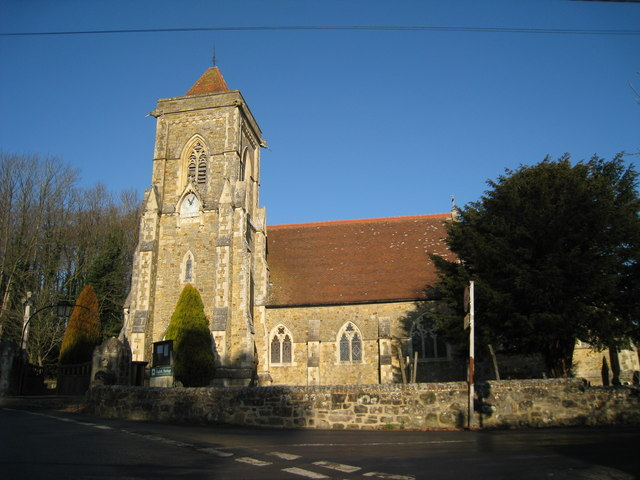
Church of St John the Baptist

Netherfield ward is represented by two of the thirteen members of Battle Town Council, the lowest tier of local government.
