= Anderdon =

Anderdon is a surname, and may refer to:

- Henry Murray-Anderdon (1848–1922), cricket administrator
- James Hughes Anderdon (1790–1879), English banker, slave owner and art collector
- John Anderdon (1792–1874), English writer
- John Proctor Anderdon (1760–1846), English merchant, slave owner and art collector, father of James Hughes Anderdon and John Anderdon
- William Henry Anderdon (1816–1890), English Jesuit and writer, son of John Anderdon
