= George Peter Holford =

English politician (1767–1839)

George Peter Holford (1767–1839) was an English barrister, politician and author. With the exception of a short break 1806–7, he was a Tory Member of Parliament from 1803 to 1826, for a number of constituencies. Holford was an advocate of prison reform.

== Early life ==
He was the second son of Peter Holford, a Master in Chancery, and his wife Anne Nutt, daughter of William Nutt of Buxted. He was educated at Harrow School. He matriculated at St John's College, Cambridge in 1784, graduating B.A. in 1788, and M.A. in 1791.

Holford entered Lincoln's Inn in 1788 and was called to the bar in 1791.

== In politics ==
Holford was a friend of Lord Castlereagh, who in 1802 became President of the Board of Control, overseeing the East India Company. He was also on good terms with the rising Tory politicians Lord Hawkesbury, Richard Ryder and Nicholas Vansittart. At the end of 1802, the Prime Minister Henry Addington told Holford that he would shortly be brought into the House of Commons. It was managed in January 1803, at Bossiney, with the agreement of Lord Mount Edgecumbe. When Addington made way for William Pitt the younger in May 1804, Benjamin Hobhouse who was Secretary of the Board of Control resigned, and Holford replaced him, working under Castlereagh to whom he became close.

In 1806 Holford dropped out of parliament, no longer having support from Lord Mount Edgecumbe. But he was brought back in 1807, backed by the same interest at Lostwithiel, as a prospective supporter of what became the second Portland ministry, and at Castlereagh's request. He returned to the position as Secretary of the Board of Control, which he held then to 1809, leaving, as he explained to the President Lord Harrowby in the aftermath of the duel between Castlereagh and George Canning, out of sympathy with Castlereagh.

Holford was a supporter of the Philanthropic Society, and had been involved in 1806 in having it incorporated. He was invited in 1810 by Richard Ryder, the Home Secretary, to chair a select committee to implement the Penitentiary for Convicts Act 1794. A site at Millbank had been found through James Cecil, 1st Marquess of Salisbury. In 1812 Holford obtained a grant to proceed with a penitentiary for London and Middlesex convicted prisoners who had been sentenced to transportation. For a few years from 1810, also, the Holford Committee allied itself with the generally Whig agitation set off by Samuel Romilly's campaign for criminal law reform, with Henry Grey Bennet and others, that made some piecemeal legislative progress. In 1811–2 Holford was corresponding with Jeremy Bentham on behalf of the committee, to obtain documentation of the Panopticon project.

In the end, Holford and the committee rejected Bentham's principles, and the National Penitentiary was constructed over the next few years without regard for them. It was not quite a foregone conclusion, but Bentham's ideas were found to be impractical. The input from magistrates, such as John Thomas Becher, George Onesiphorus Paul, and William Morton Pitt, had more traction. The construction work was overseen by Holford with Becher and Charles Long.

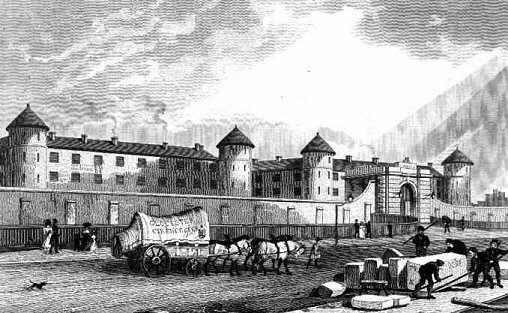
The National Penitentiary at Millbank during the 1820s

In the general election 1812 Holford was brought in for Dungannon by Thomas Knox, 1st Viscount Northland, its patron, for the Liverpool ministry, disregarding his son Thomas Knox as pro-Catholic. Holford held the seat until Northland died in 1818. In 1818 he was given a seat at Hastings, at this period represented solely by government placemen. In 1820 he was moved to Queenborough, again an untroubled seat for supporters of Lord Liverpool.

Holford became a governor of the National Penitentiary, the "most active" on the board according to the Webbs, and defended it against critics. In debate on the Prisons (Ireland) Act 1821 introduced as a bill by Charles Grant, he brought to bear experience of travel in Ireland – his wife was from County Donegal. With Sir John Newport, Thomas Spring Rice and others, he argued for measures on inspection and reporting.

In 1826 Holford retired from parliament. On Lord Liverpool's death in 1828, he was one of the executors.

== Death ==
Holford died in Gloucester Place, on 30 April 1839. He had served as a governor of the New River Company.

== Works ==
Holford published on penal reform and the National Penitentiary project:

- Substance of the speech of George Holford (1815)
- Thoughts on the Criminal Prisons of this Country: Occasioned by the Bill Now in the House of Commons (1821). Contribution to the debate leading up to the Gaols Act 1823.
- Vindication of the General Penitentiary at Millbank (1822), reply to criticism of the National Penitentiary project, including points made by Charles Callis Western.
- Short Vindication (2nd edition) with Second Vindication (1825)
- Third Vindication of the General Penitentiary (1825), reply to Peter Mere Latham.
- Statements and observations concerning the hulks (1826)
- An Account of the General Penitentiary at Millbank (1828)
- Letter to the editor of the Quarterly review on a misstatement (1830)

With Edward Gale Boldero and Charles Bosanquet, Holford replied on behalf of the Philanthropic Society to criticism of John Brand of plans for the Philanthropic Chapel.

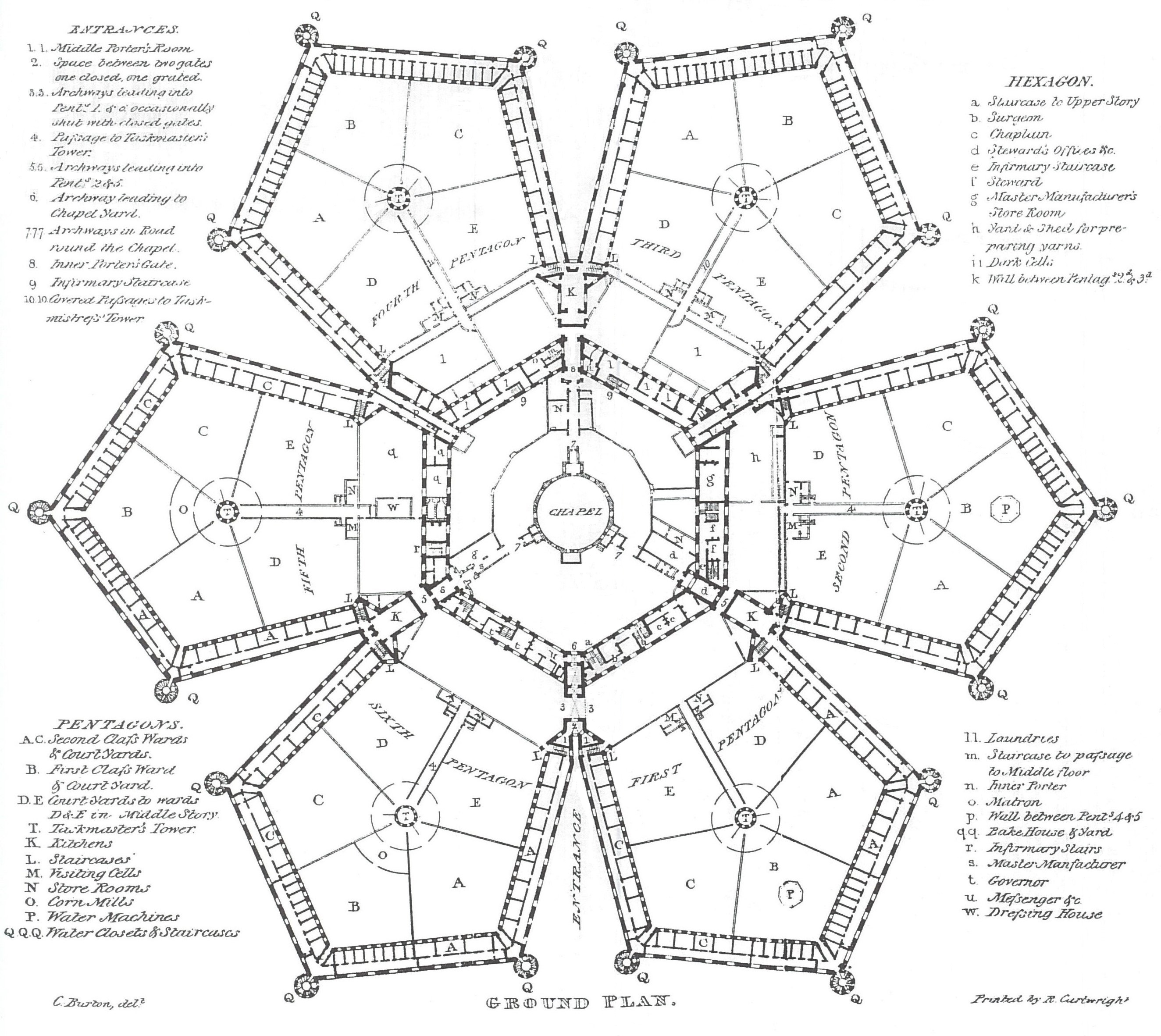
Millbank Prison ground plan, 1828, from An Account of the General Penitentiary at Millbank, opposite p.66

=== Other works ===
- Poems, verse from Holford's time at Harrow.
- Thoughts on the new and old principles of political obedience (1793). Holford argued for a form of social contract theory on rights.
- The Cave of Neptune (1794), dramatic poem on the Glorious First of June.
- The Storm, drama, with Berthier's Dream at Rome (1798)
- True Patriotism, Or, Poverty Ennobled by Virtue: A Drama (1799), with Thomas Robinson. This work has been attributed to Margaret Holford (1761–1834).
- The Destruction of Jerusalem (1805), anonymous.
- Observations on the necessity of introducing a sufficient number of respectable clergymen into our colonies in the West Indies (1808)

== Family ==
Holford married Anne Daniell, daughter of the Rev. Averill Daniell of Lifford. They had one son, Robert Stayner Holford. Of their daughters:

- Anne Jane (died 1839) married in 1835 Robert Blagden Hale.
- Georgina, married in 1856 as his second wife Peter Burrell, 4th Baron Gwydyr.
- Emily (died 1852), the youngest, married in 1836 Sir George Joseph Palmer, 3rd Baronet.

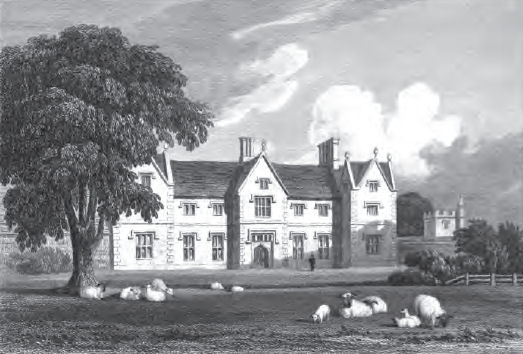
Westonbirt House, engraving c.1826

At Westonbirt House, a family property, Holford replaced the old manor house with one in Gothic style, in 1823. He laid out gardens there, and is thought to have acted as his own designer, but perhaps under the influence of William Sawrey Gilpin. The gardens were later much developed by his son, who used Lewis Vulliamy to rebuild Westonbirt House 1863–1870.
