= Rock Hall, Northumberland =

18th-century country house near Alnwick, Northumberland, UK

Coordinates: 55.47575°N 1.68389°W

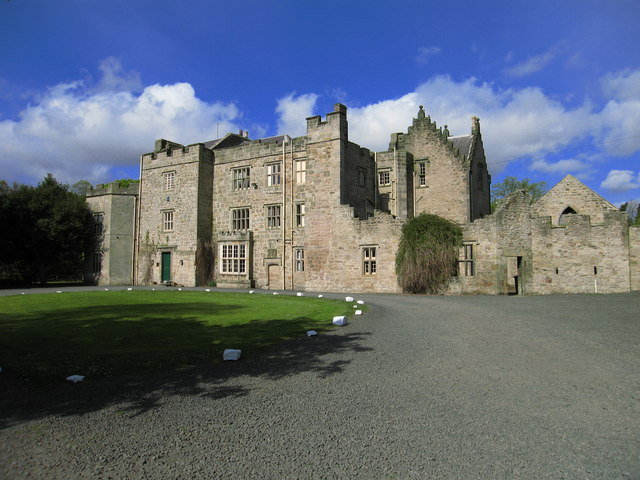
Rock Hall

Rock Hall is a privately owned 18th-century country house, at Rock, Rennington, near Alnwick, Northumberland (grid reference NU20082026). It is a Grade II* listed building.

== History ==
The Manor of Rock was owned by several Northumbrian families, Rock, Swinhoe, Lawson, Salkeld (1620–1705), Proctor. It passed into the Villiers family, and the estate was sold in 1794 by George Villiers, 4th Earl of Jersey to Peter Holford. At this period the house itself was a burnt-out ruin. Robert Holford, to whom it passed on his father Peter Holford's death in 1804, transferred it that year to Charles Bosanquet, married to his sister Charlotte.

=== House ===
There was a house on the estate from the 14th century. The south wing was converted to a tower house in the 15th century and the whole was remodelled by the Salkelds in the 17th century.

Badly damaged by fire in 1752, the house was restored around 1819 by Charles Bosanquet, for whom architect John Dobson created two octagonal wings attached to the pele tower on its south front, as well as stables and a coach house. A new north-west wing was added by architect F.R. Wilson in the mid 19th century. Members of the Bosanquet family born at Rock include scientist Robert Bosanquet, Admiral Sir Day Bosanquet and philosopher Bernard Bosanquet. Professor Robert Carr Bosanquet, an archaeologist, also lived at Rock Hall.

In 1881 the estate comprised 1,130 acres (4.6 km^{2}), employing 44 staff on the land and 11 in the house. From 1929 to 1939 the house was leased by Helen Christian Sutherland, an art patron and friend to well known writers and intellectuals. During her residence the house displayed much of her art collection and often hosted her circle of friends, including David Jones and Ben Nicholson and members of the Ashington Group.

In 1948, the house was leased at a peppercorn rent to the Youth Hostel Association by Charles Ion Carr Bosanquet, for an initial term of 30 years. An 80-bed hostel was duly opened by Lord Beveridge on 27 May 1950, and subsequently more than 10,000 overnight stays were recorded in peak years. (Note: This occurred in 1974–1976, and also in 1990.) It remained in use until 1991, when the lease (Note: Presumably, this was renewed by Charles Bosanquet before his death in 1986.) was revoked.

The following year, the building was taken over by nearby Rock Moor School, founded in 1984 by (Mrs) Lalage Bosanquet. This had begun life as a private nursery school, but in 1988, indicated that it would start taking children up the age of 11. By 1994, when it sought status as a charitable trust, the renamed Rock Hall School was accepting new pupils aged 3 to 13. This co-educational preparatory school closed in 2013, after which Rock Hall reverted to being a private residence.
