= Charles Bosanquet (academic) =

University vice-chancellor (1903–1986)

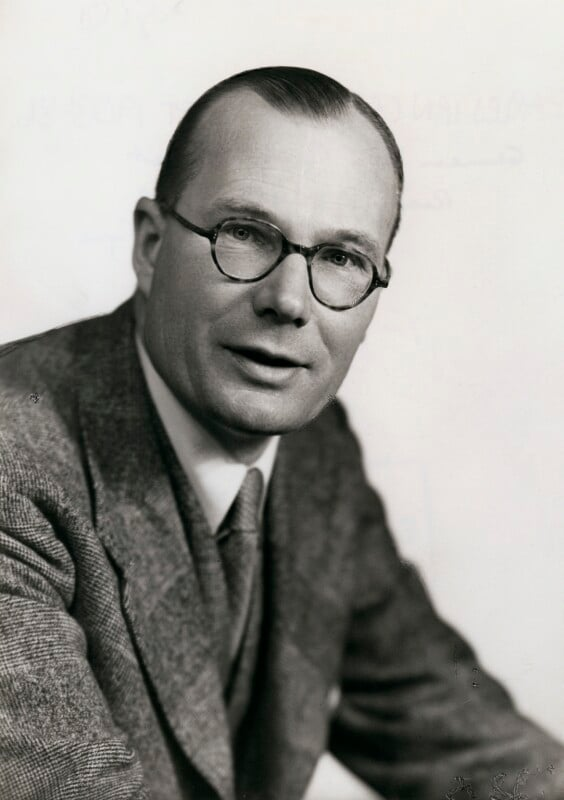
Bosanquet in 1951

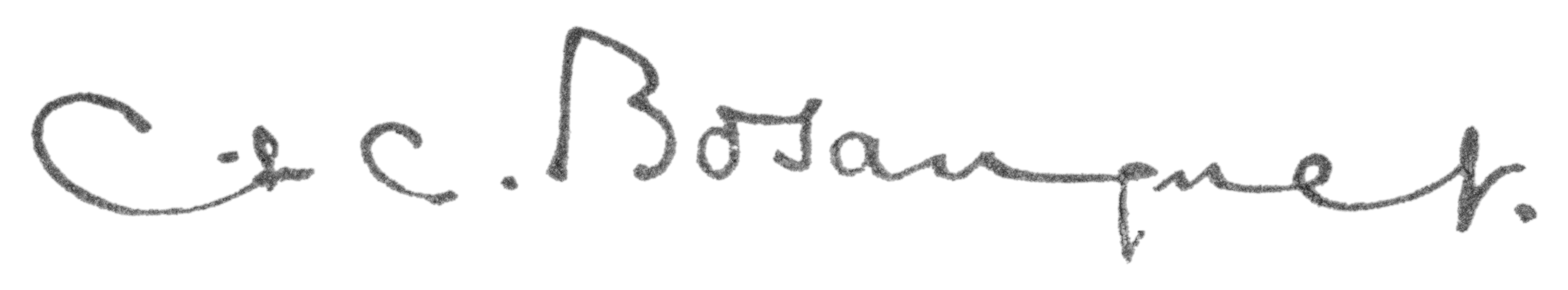
Signature of Charles Bosanquet

Charles Ion Carr Bosanquet (19 April 1903 – 9 April 1986) was a Vice‑chancellor of Durham University, and the first Vice-chancellor of Newcastle University.

== Career ==
Bosanquet was born in Athens on 19 April 1903, the eldest child of Ellen Sophia (née Hodgkin) and Robert Carr Bosanquet. At the time, his father was Director of the British School of Archaeology in the Greek capital. He was educated at Winchester College and Trinity College, Cambridge, from which he graduated in 1925 with a first class honours degree in History. For two years he worked as a journalist for the Financial News, then moved to the merchant bank Lazard Brothers in the City of London. Following the outbreak of the Second World War, he joined the Civil Service, and was a Principal Assistant Secretary in the Ministry of Agriculture from 1941 to 1945.

In 1945, Bosanquet became treasurer of Christ Church, Oxford. He was appointed vice‑chancellor of Durham University in 1952, and held this position in alternation with James F. Duff until 1960. (Note: From 1937 to 1962, the post of Vice‑chancellor rotated every two years between the warden of Durham University (or, strictly speaking, the "Durham Colleges") and rector of King's College, Newcastle. Duff was warden from 1937 to 1960, and served six terms as vice‑chancellor. Succeeding Eustace Percy, who stepped down during his final period in office, Bosanquet held the position in 1952, 1955–1956, and 1959–1960.) From 1952 onwards, he was also rector of King's College in Newcastle upon Tyne, which at the time was part of Durham University. Bosanquet played an important role in steering the college towards its independence in 1963, when he became vice‑chancellor of the newly created Newcastle University. In that role, on 13 November 1967, he welcomed Martin Luther King Jr. to the university, presenting him with a Doctor of Civil Law degree. He played a key role in the development of institution's Department of Archaeology, and both he and his wife were also deeply involved with student welfare. He retired in 1968.

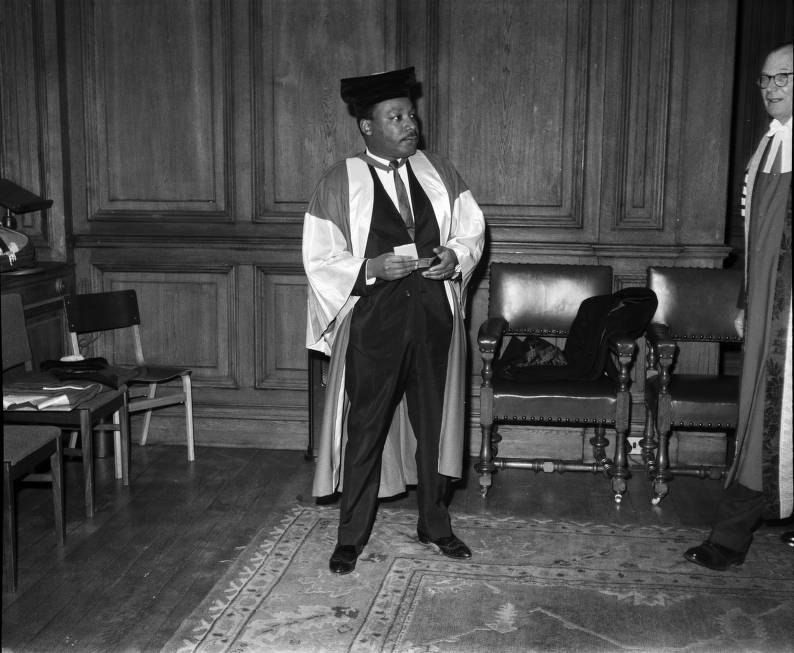
Martin Luther King Jr. after receiving his honorary doctorate, with Charles Bosanquet on the right, in 1967

Between 11 March 1948 and 4 March 1949, Bosanquet acted as High Sheriff of Northumberland. He was elected a vice-president of the Natural History Society of Northumbria immediately after becoming a member in December 1952, and held the position until resigning on health grounds towards the end of his life.

== Personal life ==
In January 1931, Bosanquet married Barbara Schieffelin (1906–1987) of Park Avenue, New York, the youngest daughter of William Jay Schieffelin, and a direct descendant of US founding father John Jay and American business magnate Cornelius Vanderbilt. His cousin, William Bosanquet, was married to Esther Cleveland, daughter of US President Grover Cleveland.

Both the Bosanquet and Schieffelin families were of Huguenot descent, the family seat of the Bosanquets being at Rock, near Alnwick, Northumberland. Bosanquet lived at Rock Moor House, and leased Rock Hall to the Youth Hostel Association for a term of 30 years in 1950. In 1952, he was reported to be actively engaged in farming on the estate, and had exhibited sheep at local agricultural shows.

Bosanquet died on 9 April 1986, and a memorial service was held on 3 October of that year at the Church of St Thomas the Martyr, Newcastle. He is buried with his wife at the Church of St. Philip and St. James in Rock. A stained glass window in the church commemorates Bosanquet's parents, as well as the couple themselves. They had a son and three daughters.

== See also ==
- Bernard Bosanquet (philosopher) (Note: Great uncle of Charles.)
- Charles Bosanquet (1759–1850) (Note: Great great grandfather of Charles.)
- Admiral Sir Day Hort Bosanquet

== Notes ==
Academic offices
Preceded by New Post	Vice-Chancellor of the University of Newcastle upon Tyne; 1963–1968	Succeeded by Henry Miller
Preceded by Sir James Fitzjames Duff & Lord Eustace Percy	Vice-Chancellor & Warden of the University of Durham; 1952–1960; With: Prof Sir James Fitzjames Duff until 1958	Succeeded by Prof. Sir Derman Christopherson
