= Robert Carr Bosanquet =

British archaeologist (1871–1935)

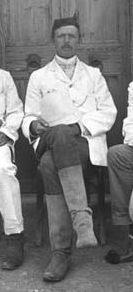
- Photographed at Roussolakkos on Crete, 1903–1905
- Occupation: Archaeologist

Academic background
- Education: Eton College; Trinity College, Cambridge

Academic work
- Discipline: Classical archaeology
- Institutions: University of Liverpool; British School at Athens

Robert Carr Bosanquet (1871–1935) was a British archaeologist, who excavated in the Aegean and in Britain. He was the first Professor of Classical Archaeology at the University of Liverpool, teaching there from 1906 to 1920. He was particularly significant to the archaeology of Wales, excavating at the Roman sites of Caerleon and Caersws and founding the Royal Commission on the Ancient and Historical Monuments of Wales, which played an influential role in the direction of twentieth-century archaeology in the country.

== Life and work ==
Robert Carr Bosanquet was born in London on 7 June 1871, the son of Charles Bertie Pulleine Bosanquet, of Rock Hall, Alnwick, Northumberland. He was educated at Eton College and at Trinity College, Cambridge, where he was a member of the Pitt Club.

Admitted in 1892 as a student at the British School at Athens (BSA) – where he was an approximate contemporary of the archaeologist John Linton Myres – he was among the first to lead excavations at the Minoan seaside town of Palaikastro on Crete, from 1902 to 1905. He also served as Assistant Director and then Director, from 1900 to 1906, of the BSA, during one of its productive periods as a research centre. He ran other important excavations on newly independent Crete, at Praisos, between 1901 and 1902, and initiated the School's major campaigns at Sparta on the Greek mainland. In 1906, he became the first Professor of Classical Archaeology at the University of Liverpool.

Bosanquet’s first Romano-British excavations were at the fort of Housesteads on Hadrian's Wall in 1898. He organised fieldwork on the Roman military sites of Caerleon and Caersws for the short-lived Committee for Excavation and Research in Wales and the Marches, alongside Myres, who was then his colleague at Liverpool. This work helped set the research agenda for much of the following century. He was a founder-commissioner of the Royal Commission on the Ancient and Historical Monuments of Wales, which recorded archaeological discoveries in Wales, running alongside his Welsh fieldwork of 1908–1909. He helped to visit and synthesise the archaeology of many counties through the Commission's Inventories and developed an interest in hillfort archaeology. The archaeologist Mortimer Wheeler, who knew him and was in a sense Bosanquet's successor in Wales, situated his own early excavations "in direct line of descent from those instituted by [Bosanquet] and the Liverpool Committee".

After wartime service between 1915 and 1917 in hospital organisation and relief work in Albania, Corfu and Salonica, Bosanquet retired from teaching at Liverpool in 1920. He lived in his retirement in Rock, Northumbria, in the north of England. He became a respected local archaeologist, but published little of his great store of knowledge on the nature and date of Roman imports north of the frontiers in Britain, Holland, Germany and Denmark. He wrote to his son Charles in 1927: "That the attraction of this place and its tradition is strong, is proved by the curious way in which, for three generations, we have given up very different occupations to settle here; but I think that R.W.B. the parson, C.B.P.B. the social reformer and R.C.B. the archaeologist, would have done better work here if they had spent more of their lives in the North, and had a business training into the bargain ..."

Bosanquet died in 1935. His obituaries focused chiefly on his character and on his pre- and post-Liverpool activities.

== Marriage and family ==
He married Ellen Sophia Hodgkin (1875–1965), a history graduate of Somerville College, Oxford and daughter of the historian Thomas Hodgkin. They had five children:

- Charles (born 1903), married Barbara Schieffelin in 1931
- Violet (born 1907), married John Pumphrey in 1931
- Diana (born 1909), married Henry Hardman in 1937
- Lucy (born 1911), married Michael Gresford Jones in 1933
- David (born 1916), married Camilla Ricardo in 1941
