= Fallodon railway station =

Disused railway station in Northumberland, England

Fallodon
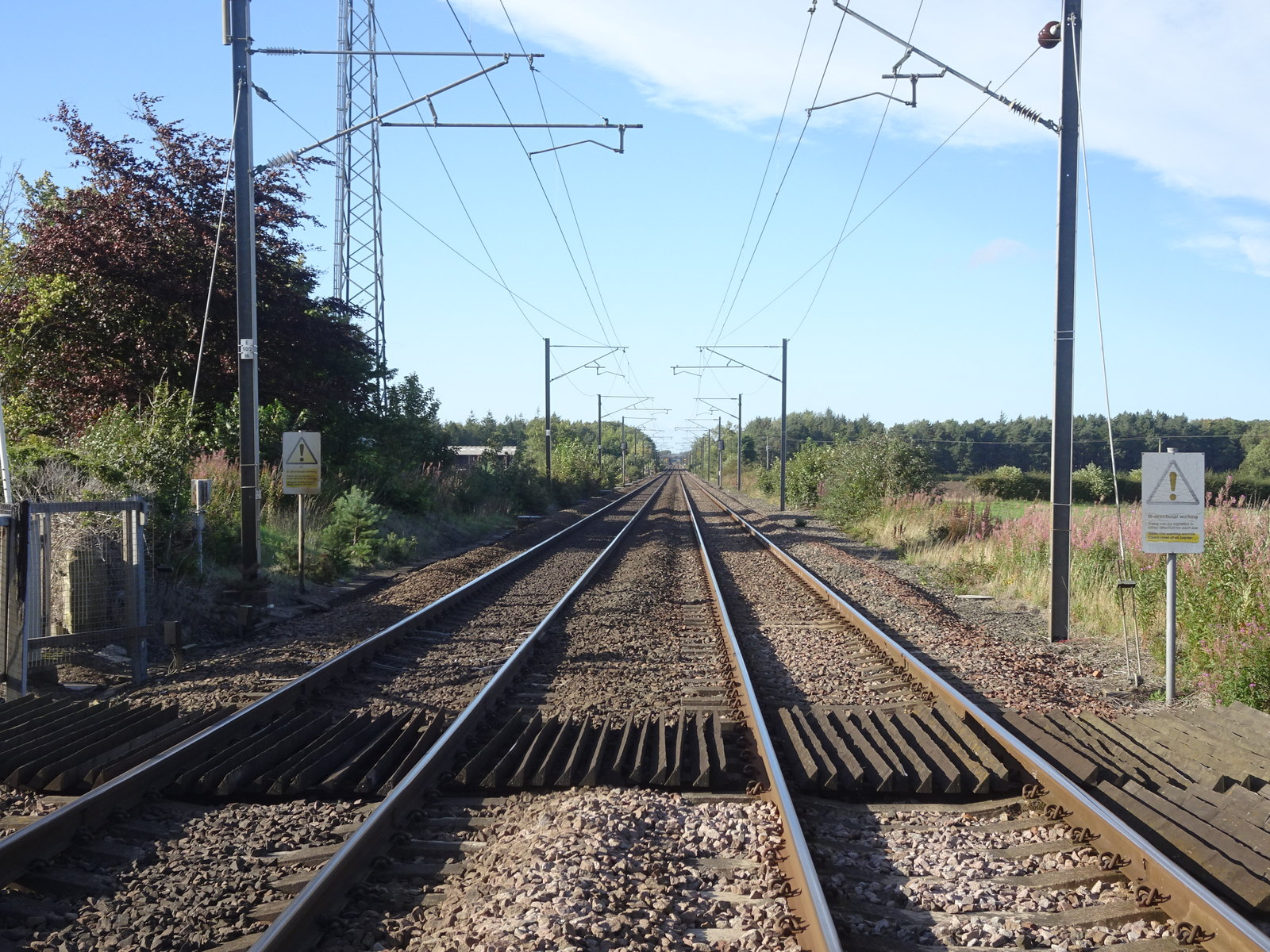
- The site of the station, looking northwest towards Chathill, in 2018

General information
- Location: Fallodon, Northumberland; England
- Coordinates: 55.5084°N 1.6722°W
- Grid reference: NU208239
- Platforms: 2

Other information
- Status: Disused

History
- Original company: York, Newcastle and Berwick Railway
- Pre-grouping: North Eastern Railway
- Post-grouping: LNER

Key dates
- 1 July 1847: Opened
- 30 May 1934: Closed
Location

Fallodon railway station was a private railway station built for Sir George Grey at Fallodon Hall, Northumberland, England from 1847 to 1934 on the East Coast Main Line.

== History ==
The station was opened on 1 July 1847 by the York, Newcastle and Berwick Railway. To help ensure the support of the Grey family, whose land was being crossed, the railway company provided a private station for their exclusive use. Sir George, his son George Henry, and grandson Sir Edward Grey all made use of station, generally for travel to and from London and York. The station was situated on the north side of the level crossing on the lane branching off the B1340 a short distance northeast of Christon Bank village. Newcastle architect Benjamin Green designed the stations on the line, with Fallodon being a diminutive version of the larger buildings, some of which still stand, such as nearby Christon Bank. After the death of Sir Edward (later Viscount) Grey in 1933, the London & North Eastern Railway bought out the right to stop trains from Grey's nephew Cecil Graves, who had inherited the estate, and the station closed completely on 30 May 1934. The railway workers planted a copper beech tree in memory of Grey. The station was demolished in the mid 60s. Although the platforms and buildings were removed, the forecourt of the old station building still remains with a short section of the wall. The North Eastern Railway Association, with the assistance of Network Rail, the Bridgeman family of Fallodon Hall, and Adrian Graves, Viscount Grey’s great-great nephew, erected an interpretation board next to the site of the station on 25th April 2023; Edward Grey's birthday.

Preceding station	Historical railways	Following station
Christon Bank; Line open, station closed	York, Newcastle and Berwick Railway; East Coast Main Line	Chathill; Line and station open
