= Christon Bank =

Village in Northumberland, England

Coordinates: 55.501151°N 1.663837°W

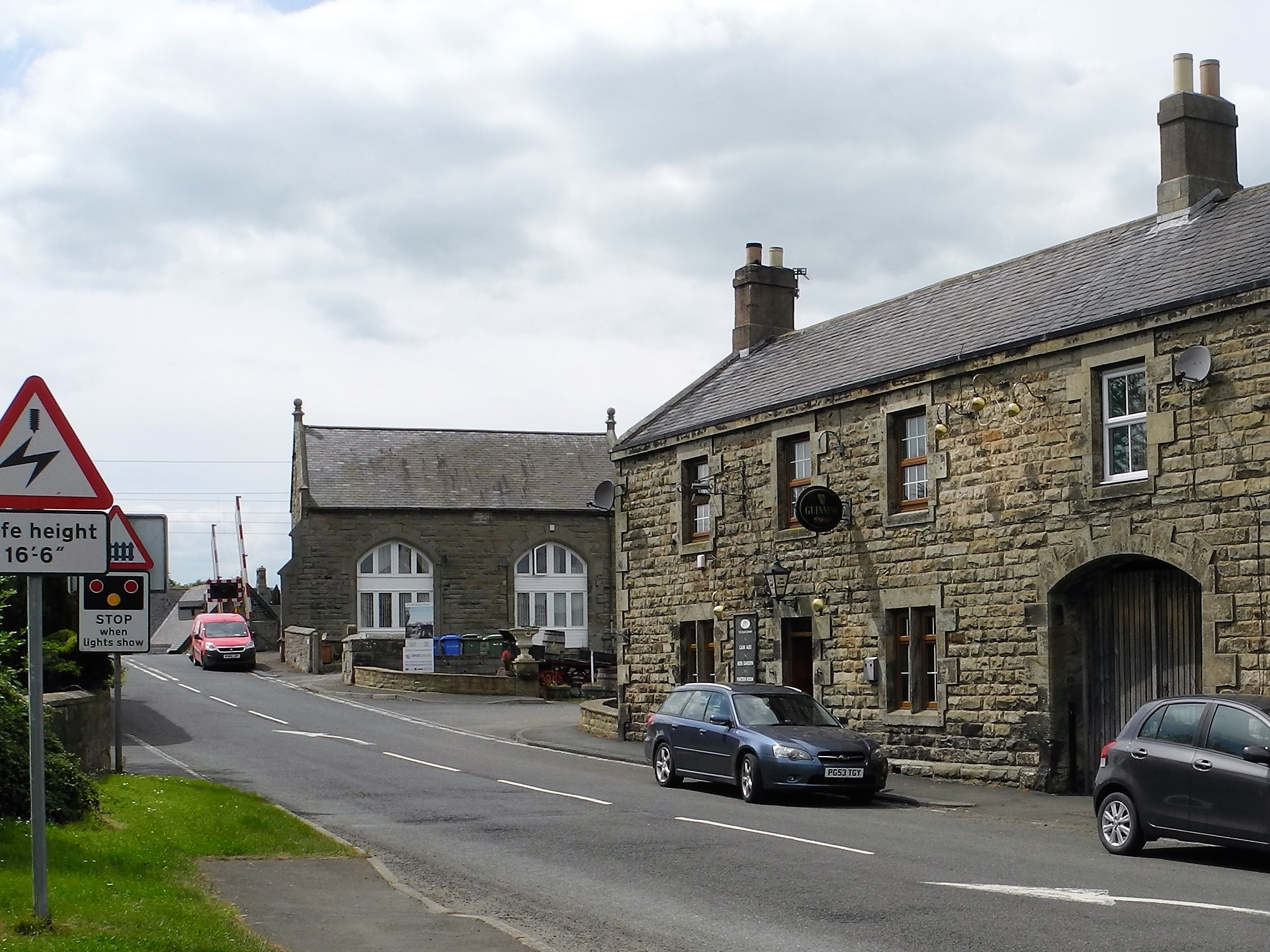
The centre of the village with the Blink Bonny pub on the right with the level crossing beyond. The building behind the pub is the old railway goods building now a private residence

Christon Bank is a small village in Northumberland, England, 9 miles north of the town of Alnwick. Prior to 1847 it was a small farming hamlet, which was transformed by the building of the East Coast Main Line railway.

== History ==
The village is named after the Christon (originally Cryston) family, who were local yeoman farmers and members of the Quaker movement. In 1598 Thomas Cryston was recorded as the freeholder who held a quarter of a freehold in a local farm. The family eventually purchased the land outright from Henry Darling before it was sold in 1759 to Henry Taylor of Rock, who extended the property to the west. The farm was further expanded in the 19th century as it embraced the onset of modern farming methods such as new fertilisers, drainage and machinery. Today Christon Bank Farm is a Grade II listed building and is still the predominant farm in the area.

The predominance of farming in the locality led to the setting up of commercial lime production in the area in the early part of the 19th century. The lime was produced as fertiliser for the local farms. A kiln was constructed in the early 1800s followed by a second one later in the century. The OS map of 1865 also shows a lime works on the site and a small quarry. The site of the lime kilns is 500 metres (1,600 ft) south-east of the village; both kilns are grade II listed buildings and received some renovation in 2005 with funding from DEFRA and co-operation from the local landowner. Other industry in the immediate area at that time included small-scale coal mining; the mine to the south of the village on the road to Rennington produced coal to burn at the lime kilns and for local use.

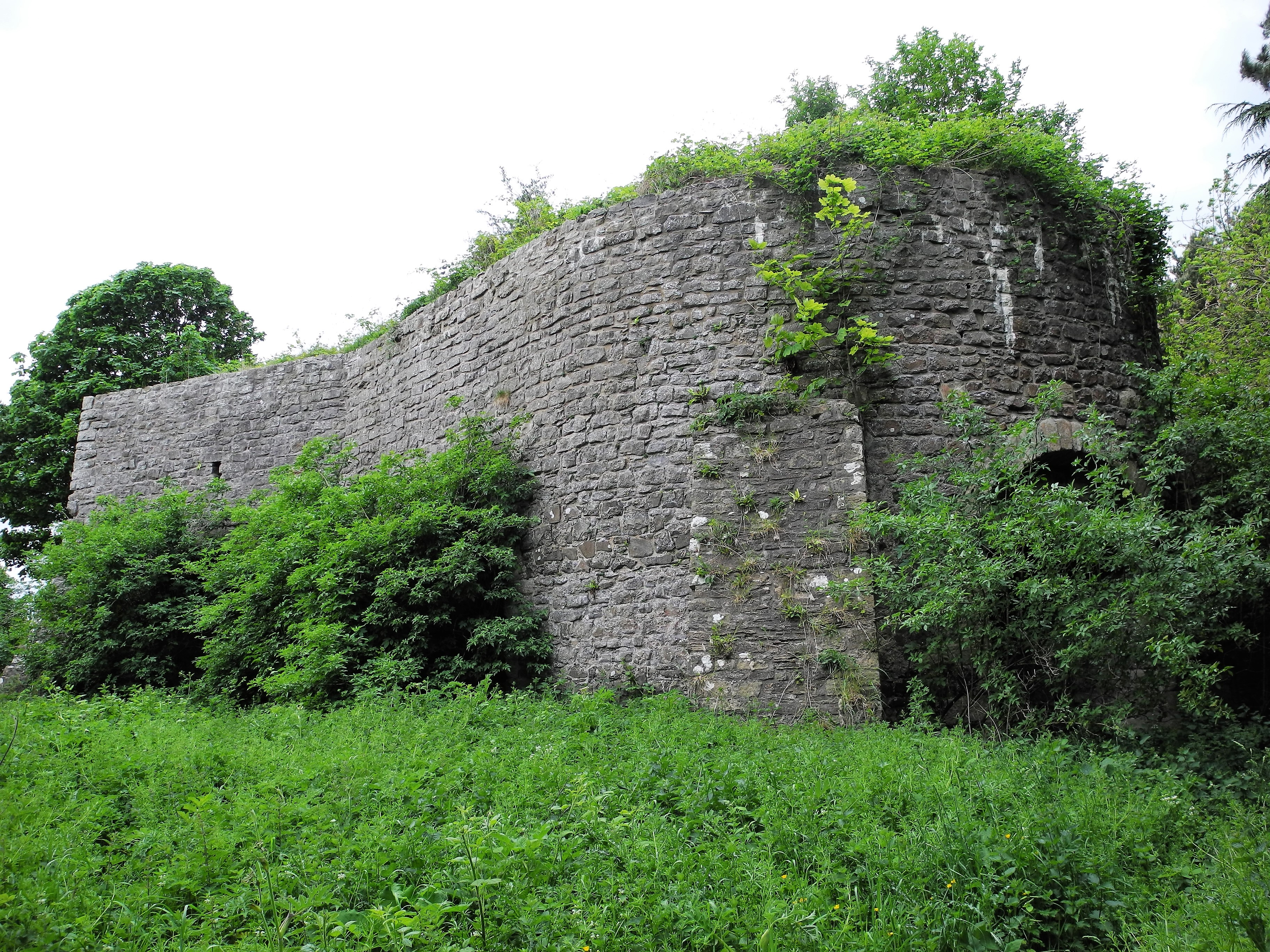
One of the lime kilns.

Prior to the opening of the railway in 1847, Christon Bank consisted of just fourteen dwellings including two public houses, the Blink Bonny and the Rising Sun. The arrival of the railway and the accompanying station transformed Christon Bank from a quiet farming hamlet to a busy village with the facilities of a main line station, which in 1885 dealt with over 10,000 passengers, over 6,000 livestock and 2,000 tons of raw materials. The raw materials included whinstone quarried at Embleton 1.6 kilometres (0.99 mi) to the east and brought by cart. A 2.4-kilometre (1.5 mi)-long tramway, known as Johnny’s Line, was built in 1895 to bring the stone directly from the quarry to the station. The tramway ran alongside the road from Embleton and had fallen out of use by the end of World War II.

The expansion of the village continued with the construction of a Primitive Methodist chapel in 1891 on the initiative of the station master Theopilus Moor and James Young who approached the Liberal statesman Sir Edward Grey for a donation of land which was approved; the first stone was laid in a special ceremony on 3 August 1891. Three more cottages were also built by the end of the century. In 1900 a laundry was set up by Lady Grey of nearby Fallodon to provide employment for local women; at that time the village had a population of 105.

== Present day ==
A major expansion of the village started in the late 1980s with the building of the Mount View residential estate on land to the west of the railway. Further housing was built on the site of the old railway sidings to the east of the line. The station itself closed in 1965 as part of the Beeching cuts, leaving the village with a feeling of a dormitory village, although the level crossing is in constant use with 100 trains a day passing through. The old station buildings have been converted to residential use. The Rising Sun pub is now closed and is rented as a holiday cottage. The Blink Bonny remains as the only public house in the village; dating from the 1820s, it was named after the race horse Blink Bonny, the winner of The Derby in 1857: two of the horse‘s hooves are on display in a cabinet in the pub. The village also has a convenience store, Post Office and art shop. There are two caravan sites, the large Christon Bank Caravan Park and the smaller Pippins Park. A further housing development of twelve detached houses known as Horsley Grange was completed just to the east of the village in 2013.

In 2011 it was estimated that 220 people lived in Christon Bank.
