= John Brand =

John Brand may refer to:

- John Brand (antiquarian) (1744–1806), English antiquarian and clergyman
- John Brand (cricketer) (1790–1856), English amateur cricketer
- John Brand (minister) (1668–1738), Scottish minister and author
- John Henry Brand (1823–1888), South African lawyer and politician
- John Brand (political writer) (died 1808), English clergyman and political writer
