= James FitzJames =

James FitzJames may refer to:

- James FitzJames, 1st Duke of Berwick (1670–1734)
- James Fitzjames (1813–c. 1848), British naval officer
- James Fitzjames Duff, English educator
- James Fitzjames Stephen, English lawyer and judge
