= Fallodon =

Hamlet in Northumberland, England

Coordinates: 55.505°N 1.677°W

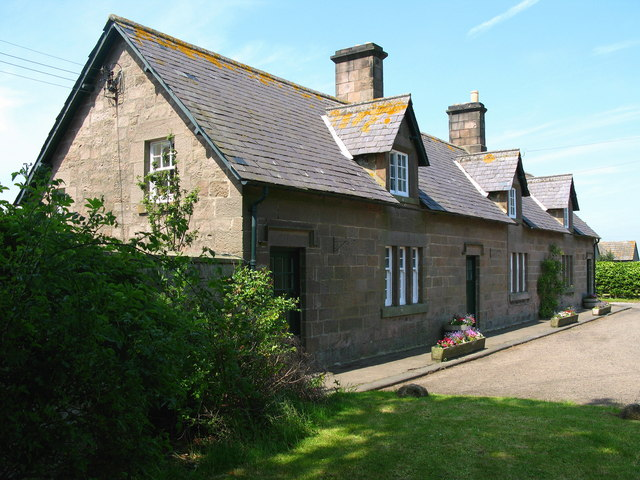
- Row of cottages, West Fallodon

- Location within Northumberland
- OS grid reference: NU205235
- Civil parish: Newton-by-the-Sea
- Unitary authority: Northumberland
- Ceremonial county: Northumberland
- Region: North East
- Country: England
- Sovereign state: United Kingdom
- Post town: ALNWICK
- Postcode district: NE66
- Police: Northumbria
- Fire: Northumberland
- Ambulance: North East
- UK Parliament: North Northumberland

Fallodon is a hamlet and former civil parish, now in the parish of Newton-by-the-Sea, in the county of Northumberland, England. It is the territorial designation of Viscount Grey of Fallodon and Baronet Grey of Fallodon. It is pronounced with the emphasis on the first syllable.

== Governance ==
Fallodon is in the parliamentary constituency of Berwick-upon-Tweed.

== History ==
The name Fallodon, formerly Fallowdon or Falloden, derives from the Old English words of fealu and dūn, meaning a pale brown hill. In the 12th century, the name of the place was spelled Falewedune, when there was a chapel there. In the subsidy roll or 1296, the name was spelled Faludon.

In 1851, Fallodon had 122 residents and was referred to as a township in the parish of Embleton. The population fell to 105 in 1871 and continued to decline to 49 in 1951. Between 1866 and 1955 Fallodon was designated as a civil parish in its own right. On the 1st of April 1955, all 1061 acres were transferred to the civil parish of Newton-by-the-Sea.

Fallodon was held as part of the Alnwick barony by the Lucker family, along with Lucker and South Charlton; Robert de Lucker inherited Fallodon from his brother Simon in 1288. In 1323, royal license was given to the representative of Alnwick Abbey to appropriate Fallodon to the use of the abbot and convent. By the 16th century, Fallodon was the property of Sir Reginald Carnaby in common with the adjoining townships of Newton-by-the-Sea and Brunton. After Sir Reginald's death in 1547, Fallodon was divided between his two daughters, Katherine, who was married to Cuthbert, Lord Ogle, and Mabel, who was married to George Lawson of Usworth. In 1581, Fallodon had become the property of William Lawson, son of Robert Lawson of Rock. In about 1598, Fallodon was sold with Rock to Sir Ralph Lawson of Brough.

Fallodon was shortly afterward mortgaged by Sir Ralph to John Salkeld of Hulne Abbey. In his will of 1623, John Salkeld left "...the village or hamlet called Fallowden..." to his second son Thomas Salkeld of Rock. By his will of 1635, Thomas Salkeld left Fallodon to his younger brother Ralph Salkeld, Mayor of Berwick, in trust of his children. By 1663, Ralph Salkeld is entered in the rate book as proprietor of Fallodon. Ralph died in 1679 and left the township to his son Samuel, who made significant improvements to Fallodon. Samuel Salkeld died in 1699, when Fallodon passed to his son William Salkeld. William was a serjeant-at-law and lived partly at Middle Temple, London and partly at Fallodon. He sold the estate to Thomas Wood in 1707. On the death of Thomas Wood in 1755, the estate became the property of his daughter, Hannah, who was married to Sir Henry Grey of Howick. On her death, Fallodon passed to their son General Sir Charles, 1st Earl Grey, then to his second son, General Sir Henry Grey, who died in 1845, when Fallodon descended to his nephew, Sir George Grey, grandson of the first Earl. Fallodon then descended to Sir George's grandson, Sir Edward Grey.

== Geography ==
Fallodon, is located about two miles west of Embleton, seven miles northeast of Alnwick, five miles northwest of Howick, two and a half miles west of the coast at Low Newton-by-the-Sea, and about 20 miles southeast of Flodden, the site of a significant battle between England and Scotland in 1513, where King James IV of Scotland was killed. Falloden is approximately 24 miles from the modern border between England and Scotland.

Edward Bateson, in his 1895 A History of Northumberland, Volume 2, described Fallodon:

It is very well wooded, and in this respect differs from most of the surrounding country. Falloden Hall is approached from the south-west by an avenue, a mile in length, which contains may fine specimens of the silver fir. From the middle of this another long avenue leads in a south-easterly direction towards Christon Bank, and there are well grown plantations all over the estate. The soil is rich and favourable to the growth of both trees and plants, but the luxuriance of vegetation is the result of the combination of natural advantages and shelter with the fostering care of successive owners of the place for the last two hundred years.

Prideaux John Selby, in his work British Forest Trees of 1842, noted several significant trees at Falloden, including several Bedford willows averaging 60 feet high, the two silver firs also noted above, approximately nine feet in circumference and 80 feet high, and two evergreen holm oaks:

In Northumberland there are fine thriving specimens, of thirty and forty years growth, at Howick, the seat of the Earl Grey, and two very fine trees at Falloden, the seat of General Sir H. Grey, of one of which our figure is a portrait; this tree is about forty-five feet high, with a trunk seven feet four inches in circumference at two feet from the ground, and a diameter of head of thirty-six feet, but it covered a much larger space previously to a storm of wind a few years ago, which tore off one of its main limbs. The other is not so high, but it covers a much larger space of ground, the diameter of the spread of the branches being upwards of seventy feet, the circumference of the bole at one foot from the ground eleven feet. Both of these trees are within the influence of the sea breeze.

== Landmarks ==
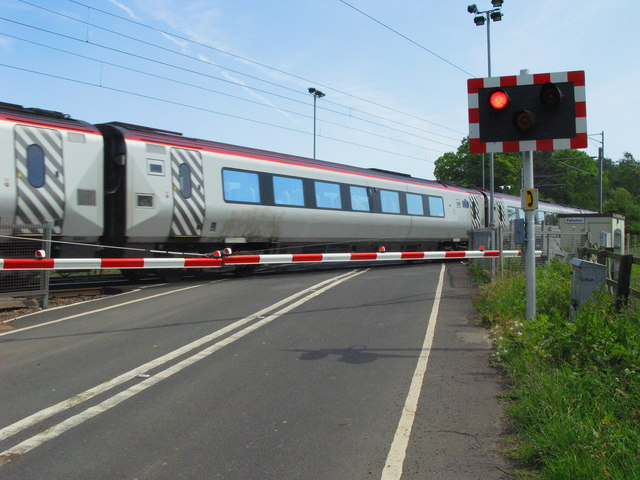
Fallodon level crossing in 2007

Fallodon Hall is a two-storey Grade II listed country house, located within the hamlet of Fallodon, on the outskirts of the town of Christon Bank. It was largely built in the early 18th century for Thomas Wood (1675-1755) of Burton in Bamburgh, who had acquired the estate in the 1707 from William Salkeld for £3,450. The Salkeld family had constructed the original red brick house and established the gardens and orchards, including a large walled garden constructed by them in the 17th century, altered in the 18th and 19th and still standing.

The rear wing added in the early 19th century by the Grey family, designed by architect John Dobson. Following a major fire in 1917, a significant remodelling was undertaken between 1921 and 1924 by Reavell and Cahill of Alnwick, including removal of the former top storey. The main part of the house is constructed of red brick from the Netherlands, which came as ballast in ships, with ashlar dressings. The rear wing is squared stone, the roofs are slate. There is a rainhead located at the entrance on the north side of the house dated 1796 with the initials C.G. (Charles Grey) on it. The east and west gatehouse lodges of Fallodon Hall also still stand.

Fallodon Hall was sold in 1946 to The Hon. Henry Bridgeman, who was descended from the earls of Bradford and Scarborough, by Edward Grey's nephew, Captain Sir Cecil Graves. The Hall remains in the Bridgeman family as a private residence, with the gardens often being open to the public to raise funds for the Red Cross and the wider estate still operating as a farm.

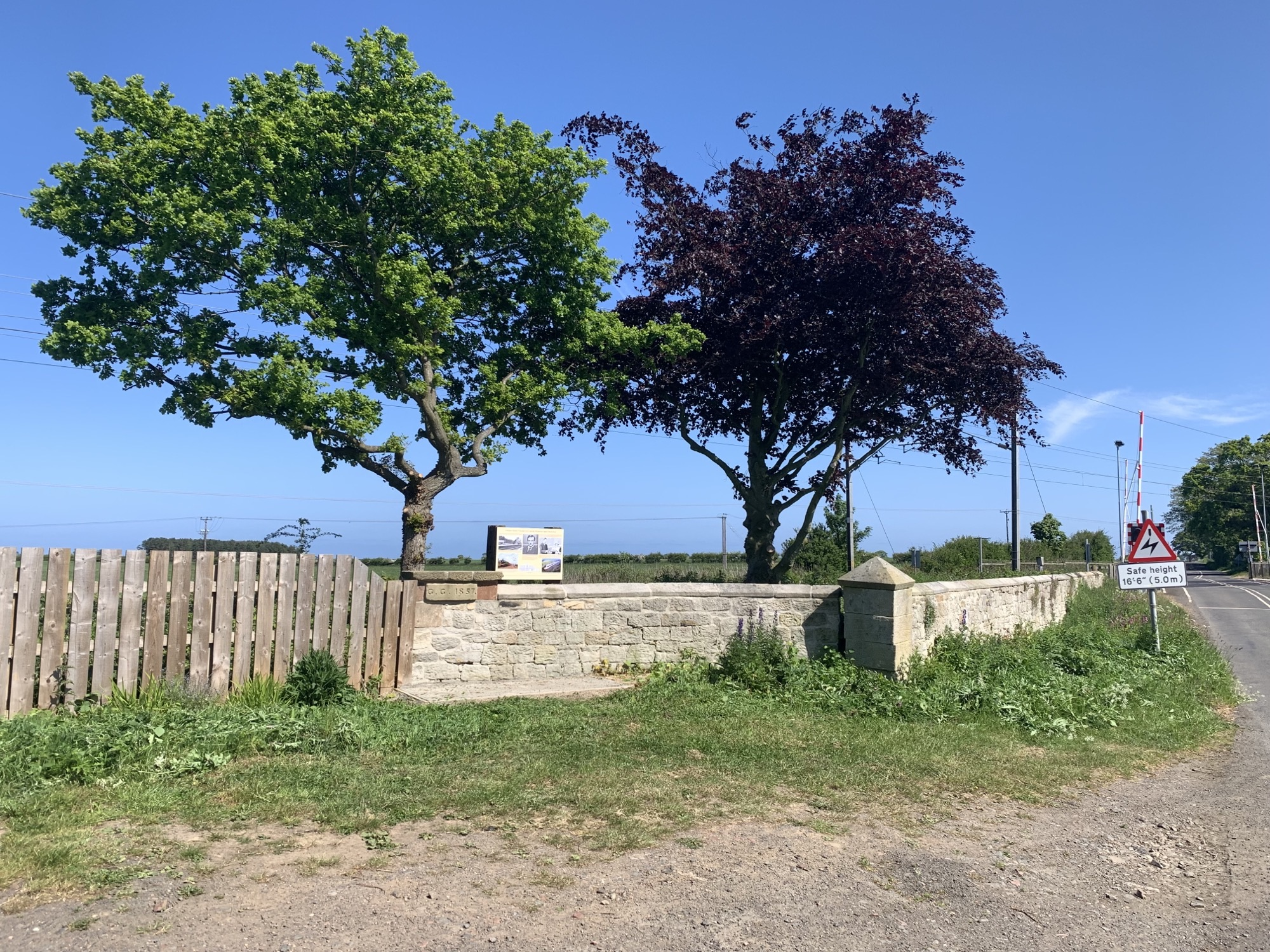
The information board and memorial tree in June 2023.

The East Coast Main Line railway runs through Fallodon, with Chathill station being closest to the hamlet. There was a small railway station located close to Fallodon Hall for the private use of the Grey family, this was named Fallodon, though referred to in a local guide pamphlet as the halt. The station was opened in 1847, when Sir George Grey was Home Secretary, it closed in 1934. The building no longer exists, though there is an extant stone wall and graveled area where it stood close to the Fallodon eastern gatehouse. When Edward Grey died in 1933 the railway staff at Fallodon planted a copper beech tree in his memory in the station garden. The tree still exists and to help maintain a wider understanding of its purpose the North Eastern Railway Association placed an information board at the site in April 2023. This records Grey’s association with the former station and the North Eastern Railway, and was generously supported by the Bridgeman Family, Adrian Graves (Grey’s great-great nephew) and Network Rail.

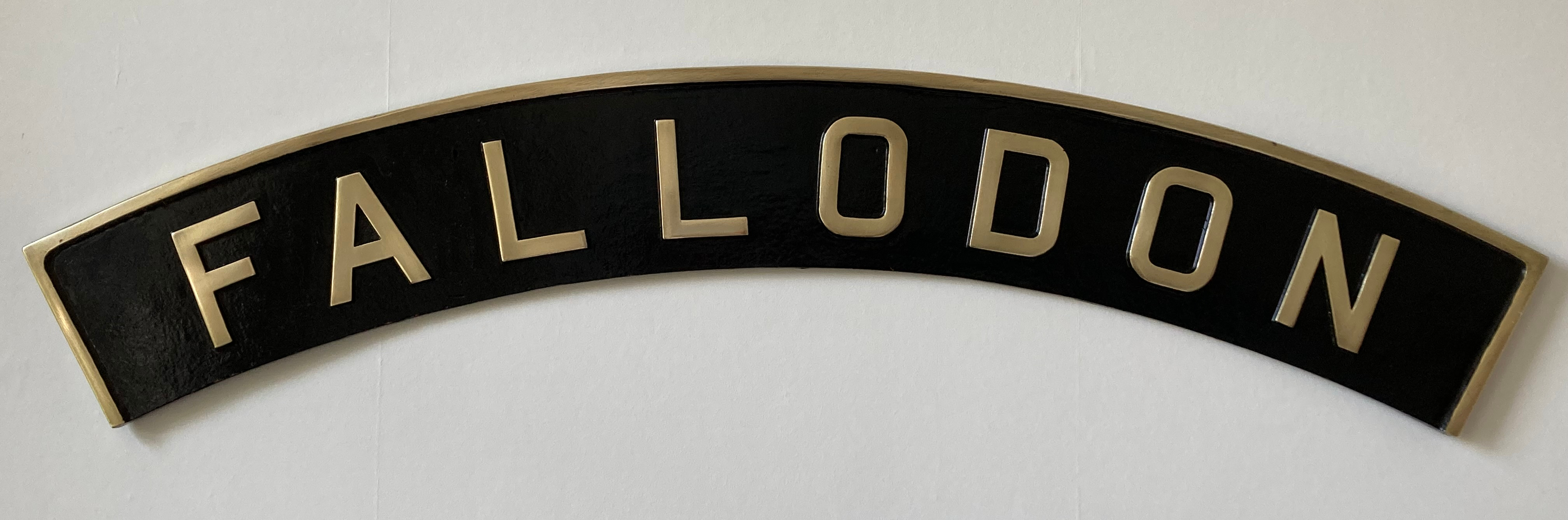
Nameplate from the locomotive

An LNER Class B17 steam locomotive built at Darlington and completed in October 1930 received the name Fallodon. However apart from occasional visits to Darlington for maintenance, it spent most of its working life in Manchester (Gorton) - from where it worked expresses to Harwich and London - and later in East Anglia. It was withdrawn from service in September 1959; its nameplates survive in private collections.

== Notable people ==
Samuel Salkeld (1635–99) was a celebrated gardener who made significant improvements to the productivity of Fallodon as noted by the contemporary source Thesaurus Geographicus in 1695:

The Improvement in Tillage at Rock by John Salkeld, Esq. and in Gardening and Fruitery at Falladon, by Samuel Salkeld, Gentleman; are Fineries hardly to be met with in these parts: The latter is the more remarkable, because of an Opinion which has prevail'd in the World, That the coldness of the Climate in these Northern parts, will not allow any Fruit to come to its proper perfection and ripeness.

Edmund Gibson, in his 1695 translation of William Camden's Britannia also commented on the Salkeld's husbandry:

In this neighbourhood, the improvements in Tillage, and in Gardening and Fruitery, by the Salkelds (in this Parish of Emildon) ought here to be mentioned, as Fineries hardly to be equall'd on the North-side of Tyne. The latter is the more observable, because an eminent Author of this Age will hardly allow any good Peaches, Plumbs, pears, &c. to be expected beyond Northamptonfhire; whereas Fruit is produced here in as great variety and perfection as in most places in the South.

Thomas Wood (1675-1755) bequeathed a £5 annual rent-charge on the estate in the town, the proceeds of which went to the teaching of poor children. Wood also contributed to the education of poorer children of the area during his lifetime, having built a school-house at Falloden before his death.

Hannah Wood, daughter of Thomas Wood of Fallodon Hall, was raised on her father's estate and in 1720 married Henry Grey of Howick, who became High Sheriff of Northumberland in 1738 and was created 1st Baronet Grey of Howick in 1746. It is through this marriage that Fallodon Hall passed to the Grey family, who had owned nearby Howick Hall since 1319.

When Thomas Wood died in 1755, Lady Hannah Grey inherited Fallodon and upon her death in 1764 she bequeathed it to her fourth son, Charles Grey, 1st Earl Grey, who had been living there with her permission since his marriage in 1762; where they would live out their lives. Prime Minister Charles Grey, 2nd Earl Grey and Sir George Grey, 1st Baronet were his sons, both born at Fallodon, with Sir George Grey being created 1st Baronet Grey of Fallodon in 1814. Eliza Courtney, daughter of Charles Grey, 2nd Earl Grey, was raised at Fallodon by her paternal grandparents. Sir George Grey, 2nd Baronet of Fallodon and Edward Grey, 1st Viscount Grey of Fallodon also grew up at Fallodon, with Edward inheriting the estate in 1884 and dying there in 1933.
