= Thomas Campbell Robertson =

British civil servant (1789–1863)

Thomas Campbell Roberstson
- Born: 9 November 1789
- Died: 6 July 1863 (aged 73)
- Spouses: Amelia Jane Elliot; Emma Jane Anderson
- Children: 3

Thomas Campbell Robertson (9 November 1789 – 6 July 1863) was a British civil servant in the Bengal Civil Service in India.

== Personal life ==
Thomas Campbell Robertson was born in Kenilworth on 9 November 1789, the youngest son of Captain George Robertson RN and Anne (née Lewis). His father was offered a knighthood for his service in the Battle of Dogger Bank in 1781, and his mother was the daughter of Francis Lewis (1713–1802), one of the signers of the United States Declaration of Independence.

When Thomas's father died in 1791 the family moved to Edinburgh where he attended Edinburgh High School.

Robertson died at his home at 68 Eaton Square, London, on 6 July 1863.

== Career ==
Robertson was appointed Judge of the courts of the Ṣadr Dīwānī ʿAdālat and Ṣadr Nizāmat ʿAdālat at the Bengal Presidency in 1804. In 1822, he became District Magistrate in Chittagong; and from March 1825 to August 1825 he served as Agent to the Governor General in Arakan.

From 1825 to 1826 Robertson was British Political Officer of Arakan in Burma. In 1826 he was Civil Commissioner in Pegu and Ava when the Treaty of Yandaboo was signed on 24 February 1826. In 1832 he was the Agent to the Governor General on the North East Frontier Agency.

From 11 November 1835 to 27 January 1840 Robertson was Member of the council of the Governor General; he was also President of the council of India & Deputy Governor of Bengal On 4 February 1840 he was posted as Lieutenant-Governor of the North-Western Provinces where he served for eleven months till 31 December 1842. He was also District Magistrate of Kanpur. He was provisionally Governor-General for some time.

In his book Civility and Empire (2002), Professor Anindyo Roy of Colby College describes Robertson as an arch-colonialist and quotes him as saying, "the natives of India are better servants than subjects; and it is in the former capacity alone that we can ever expect to command their co-operation in any emergency."

== Works ==
- Remarks on Several Recent Publications Regarding the Civil Government and Foreign Policy of British India. J. Murray. 1829. OCLC 254174822.
- Political Incidents of the First Burmese War. Richard Bentley. 1853.
- The political prospects of British India. Thomas Hatchard. 1858. OCLC 26525661.

== Family ==
In 1830 Robertson married Amelia Jane Elliot (11 October 1810 – 19 June 1837); with whom he had three children. He married his second wife, Emma Jane Anderdon, daughter of John Proctor Anderdon, in 1852.

Government offices
Preceded by David Scott	Commissioner of Assam; 1831 – 1834	Succeeded by Francis Jenkins
Preceded by Vacant; Administered by the Governor-General of India, Lord Auckland previously by- Sir C. T. Metcalfe	Lieutenant Governor of North-Western Provinces; 4 February 1840 – 31 December 1842	Succeeded by Vacant; Administered by the Governor-General of India, Lord Auckland followed by- Sir G. R. Clerk
