= Eustace Percy, 1st Baron Percy of Newcastle =

British diplomat, Conservative politician and public servant

The Right Honourable The Lord Percy of Newcastle PC
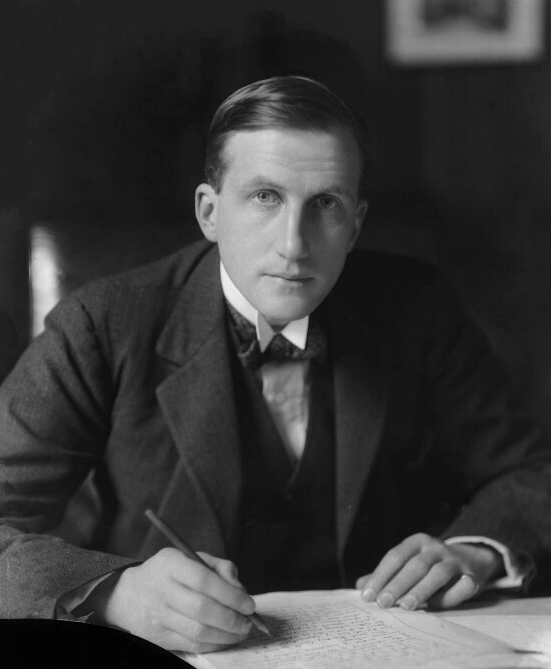

President of the Board of Education
- In office 6 November 1924 – 4 June 1929
- Monarch: George V
- Prime Minister: Stanley Baldwin
- Preceded by: Charles Trevelyan
- Succeeded by: Sir Charles Trevelyan, Bt

Minister without Portfolio
- In office 7 June 1935 – 31 March 1936
- Monarchs: George V Edward VIII
- Prime Minister: Stanley Baldwin
- Preceded by: None
- Succeeded by: None

Personal details
- Born: 21 March 1887 Mayfair, London, England
- Died: 3 April 1958 (aged 71) Etchingham, Sussex
- Party: Conservative
- Spouse: Stella Drummond
- Children: 2
- Parent(s): Henry Percy, 7th Duke of Northumberland; Lady Edith Campbell
- Education: Christ Church, Oxford

Eustace Sutherland Campbell Percy, 1st Baron Percy of Newcastle PC (21 March 1887 – 3 April 1958), styled Lord Eustace Percy between 1899 and 1953, was a British diplomat, Conservative politician, public servant, and aristocrat from the Percy family. He most notably served as President of the Board of Education under Stanley Baldwin between 1924 and 1929.

== Background and education ==
Percy was born at 25 Grosvenor Square, Mayfair, into a noble family: he was the seventh and youngest son of Henry Percy, 7th Duke of Northumberland, and Lady Edith, daughter of George Campbell, 8th Duke of Argyll. Henry Percy, Earl Percy, and Alan Percy, 8th Duke of Northumberland, were his elder brothers. His uncle, the ninth Duke of Argyll, was married to Princess Louise, daughter of Queen Victoria. A niece Lady Diana Percy later married the sixth Duke of Sutherland.

He was educated at Eton and Christ Church, Oxford. He won the Stanhope essay prize in 1907 and took first-class honours in Modern History.

== Political career ==
Percy served in the Diplomatic Service between 1911 and 1919. From 1919–22, he represented Holborn on the London County Council as a Municipal Reform Party councillor. In 1921, he was elected Member of Parliament (MP) for Hastings, a seat he held until 1937. In March 1923, he was appointed Parliamentary Secretary to the Board of Education by Bonar Law. When Stanley Baldwin became Prime Minister in May of the same year, Percy was moved to the post of Parliamentary Secretary to the Ministry of Health, which he remained until the fall of the government in January 1924.

When the Conservatives returned to power in November 1924, he was appointed President of the Board of Education by Baldwin, with a seat in the cabinet, and sworn of the Privy Council. He continued as head of the Board of Education until the government fell in June 1929.

Percy did not serve in the National Government of Ramsay MacDonald between 1931 and 1935, but when Baldwin returned as Prime Minister in June 1935 he again became a member of the cabinet as Minister without Portfolio, a post he held until 1936. Given charge of policy direction for the government in the latter role, he was often dubbed the "Minister for Thought" by the Press. In the 1930s, he called for regional government for the North East of England, specifically wishing to be the minister for the region.

In his 1944 Riddell Lecture, Percy made a call for the law to be changed radically to recognise companies as associations of productive employees, rather than as associations of shareholders. These were his words: "Here is the most important challenge to political invention ever offered to the jurist or the statesman. The human association which in fact produces and distributes wealth, the association of workmen, managers, technicians and directors is not an association recognised by law. The association which the law does recognise – the association of shareholders, creditors and directors – is incapable of producing and distributing and is not expected to perform these functions. We have to give law to the real association and withdraw meaningless privilege from the imaginary one."

In 1945, Percy chaired the committee on Higher Technological Education that resulted in the Percy Report. He also chaired a Royal Commission that reviewed mental health legislation in the 1950s and was Rector of King's College, Durham (now Newcastle University) between 1937 and 1951, in which role he also alternated in the post of Vice-Chancellor of Durham University. In 1953 he was raised to the peerage as Baron Percy of Newcastle, of Etchingham in the County of Sussex.

== Family ==
Percy married Stella Katherine, daughter of Major-General Laurence George Drummond, in 1918. They had two daughters. He died in April 1958, aged 71, in Etchingham. As he had no sons the barony became extinct on his death.

Parliament of the United Kingdom
Preceded by Laurance Lyon	Member of Parliament for Hastings; 1921 – 1937	Succeeded by Maurice Hely-Hutchinson
Political offices
Preceded by Herbert Lewis	Parliamentary Secretary to the Board of Education; 1923	Succeeded by The Earl of Onslow
Preceded by The Earl of Onslow	Parliamentary Secretary to the Ministry of Health; 1923–1924	Succeeded by Arthur Greenwood
Preceded by Charles Trevelyan	President of the Board of Education; 1924–1929	Succeeded by Sir Charles Trevelyan, Bt
Preceded by None	Minister without Portfolio; 1935–1936	Succeeded by None
Academic offices
Preceded by Sir Robert Alfred Bolam	Vice-Chancellor of the University of Durham; 1937–1952; With: Sir James Fitzjames Duff	Succeeded by Sir James Fitzjames Duff; Charles Ion Carr Bosanquet
Peerage of the United Kingdom
New creation	Baron Percy of Newcastle; 1953–1958	Extinct
