= Broxfield =

Hamlet in Northumberland, England

Coordinates: 55.442°N 1.677°W

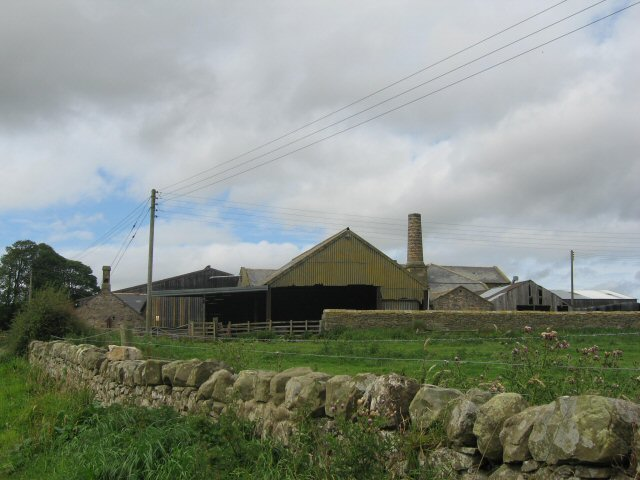

- Location within Northumberland
- OS grid reference: NU205165
- Civil parish: Rennington
- Unitary authority: Northumberland
- Shire county: Northumberland
- Region: North East
- Country: England
- Sovereign state: United Kingdom
- Post town: ALNWICK
- Postcode district: NE66
- Police: Northumbria
- Fire: Northumberland
- Ambulance: North East
- UK Parliament: Berwick-upon-Tweed

Broxfield is a hamlet and former civil parish, now in the parish of Rennington, in the county of Northumberland, England, off the B1340. In 1951 the parish had a population of 18.

== Governance ==
Broxfield is in the parliamentary constituency of Berwick-upon-Tweed. Broxfield was formerly a township in Embleton parish, from 1866 Broxfield was a civil parish in its own right until it was abolished on 1 April 1955 and merged with Rennington.
