= Laurance Lyon =

British politician

Laurance Lyon (1875 – 12 November 1932) was a British Conservative Party politician

Lyon was born in Toronto, Ontario, Canada.

He was elected Member of Parliament for Hastings at the 1918 general election, but resigned his seat in the House of Commons on 13 April 1921.

Parliament of the United Kingdom
Preceded by Arthur du Cros	Member of Parliament for Hastings; 1918 – 1921	Succeeded by Lord Eustace Percy
