= 1921 Hastings by-election =

UK Parliamentary by-election

← 1918	4 May 1921	1922 →
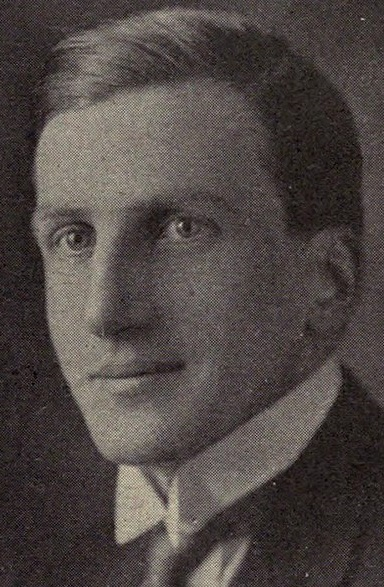
Candidate	Percy	Davies	Blackman
Party	Unionist	Labour	Liberal
Popular vote	11,685	5,437	4,240
Percentage	54.7%	25.5%	19.8%
MP before election
Lyon
Unionist
Subsequent MP
Percy
Unionist

The 1921 Hastings by-election was held on 4 May 1921. The by-election was held due to the resignation of the incumbent Coalition Unionist MP, Laurance Lyon. It was won by the Coalition Unionist candidate Eustace Percy.

Hastings by-election, 1921
Party		Candidate	Votes	%	±%
C	Unionist	Eustace Percy	11,685	54.7	−21.2
	Labour	Richard Davies	5,437	25.5	+1.4
	Liberal	Arthur Blackman	4,240	19.8	New
Majority			6,248	29.2	−22.6
Turnout			21,362	78.0	+18.8
	Unionist hold		Swing	-11.3	
C indicates candidate endorsed by the coalition government.
