= Fiscal burden of government =

Concept in economics

In economics, the fiscal burden of government imposed onto its taxpayers is the influence of the tax levied on the purchasing power of the taxpayers.

We need to differentiate tax burden and fiscal burden. Fiscal burden includes not only the influence of taxes on the budget, but also the influence of other, non-tax revenues of government (social contributions, revenues from foreign trade, other payments) on the budget.

The concept was introduced by an English clergyman and political writer John Brand. In his 1776 pamphlet, "Observations on some of the probable effects of Mr. Gilbert's Bill, to which are added Remarks on Dr. Price's account of the National Debt", he draw a distinction between "fiscal charge" and "fiscal burden". He argued that as long as prices steadily rose, though more money might be taken out of the taxpayer's pocket, the quantity of commodities which the sum levied by taxation would purchase steadily decreased, and thus if 'burden' were interpreted to be the amount of commodities of the power of purchasing which the community was deprived by taxation, its increase need not be and had not been at all proportionate to the increase of charge.

To quantify the fiscal burden and to draw comparisons of different countries, the concept of "fiscal burden of government ratio" is used. Calculated according to certain methodologies, it basically means that the lower the score, the lower the involvement of the government in the economics of the country.
