= James Duff Duff =

British classical scholar (1860–1940)

James Duff Duff (20 November 1860 – 25 April 1940), known as J. D. Duff, was a Scottish translator and classical scholar best known for his edition of Juvenal. He was a Cambridge Apostle.

== Biography ==
Duff was the son of Colonel James Duff, a retired army officer living in Aberdeenshire, and Jane Bracken Dunlop. He and his twin brother Alan were among the first boys at Fettes College, Edinburgh; he came as a scholar to Trinity College, Cambridge, in 1878 and was elected a Classical Fellow in 1883, a post he held until his death.

Teaching Latin and Greek at Trinity, and also at Girton, was the main work of his life; and he is best known to classical scholars for what A. E. Housman praised as his 'unpretending school edition' of Juvenal. He was over forty years old when he taught himself Russian, in order to read in the original the novels of Tolstoy and especially Turgenev, which he had greatly admired in French translations. He never visited Russia, but had Russian friends, with whom he corresponded in their own language: notably Alexandra Grigorievna Pashkova, the wife of a Russian landowner, whose two sons were Trinity undergraduates.

He married Laura Eleanor Lenox-Conyngham on 28 December 1895. They had five children: Lieutenant-General Alan Colquhoun Duff (1896–1973) who published books under the nom-de-plume "Hugh Imber"; Sir James Fitzjames Duff; Patrick William Duff (1901–1991), Regius Professor of Civil Law at Trinity College, Cambridge; Mary Geraldine Duff (1904–1995), principal at Norwich Training College, Norwich; and Hester Laura Elisabeth Duff (1912–2001).

Duff died at the age of 79 at Cambridge.

== Works ==
=== Editor ===
- Lucretius, T. Lucreti Cari De Rerum Natura (Cambridge, 1889)
- Juvenal, Satvrae XIV: Fourteen satires (Cambridge, 1898) (Internet Archive)
- Pliny, C. Plini Caecili secundi epistularum liber sextus (Cambridge, 1926)

=== Translator ===
- Sergei Aksakov, Years of Childhood (London: Edward Arnold, 1916) (Internet Archive)
- —, A Russian Gentleman (London: Edward Arnold, 1917)
- —, A Russian Schoolboy (London: Edward Arnold, 1917)
- Alexander Herzen, Childhood, Youth and Exile, Parts I and II of My Past and Thoughts (Yale University Press, 1923)
- Lucan, The Civil War (Loeb Classical Library, 1928) (Internet Archive)
- Silius Italicus, Punica (Loeb Classical Library, 1934) (volume I - Internet Archive); (volume II - Internet Archive)
