= James Hughes Anderdon =

English banker (1790–1879)

James Hughes Anderdon (1790–1879) was an English banker and art collector. He is now known for his large-scale projects in extra-illustration.

== Life ==
He was the second son of John Proctor Anderdon and his first wife, Anne Oliver. He became a partner in Bosanquet Anderdon & Co. with James Whatman Bosanquet, Samuel Bosanquet III, and Charles Franks. After the Slavery Abolition Act 1833, Anderdon was paid a large sum of money for the emancipation of slaves on three estates in Nevis who he claimed he was entitled compensation for due to his banking activities. He retired from the bank in 1843.

== Collector ==
Anderdon collected paintings, drawings, engravings, and autograph letters. He acquired English art at a sale in 1864 by Haskett Smith of Goudhurst (1813–1895), who was known for his "English School" collection. Anderdon bought works by John Crome, Richard Heighway, and George Morland.

His collection of engravings after portrait paintings was largely acquired at the 1852 sale of the estate of Thomas Haviland Burke. In 1868, he gave to the Print Room of the British Museum Haviland Burke's collection of James Barry's engravings and drawings.

== Legacy ==
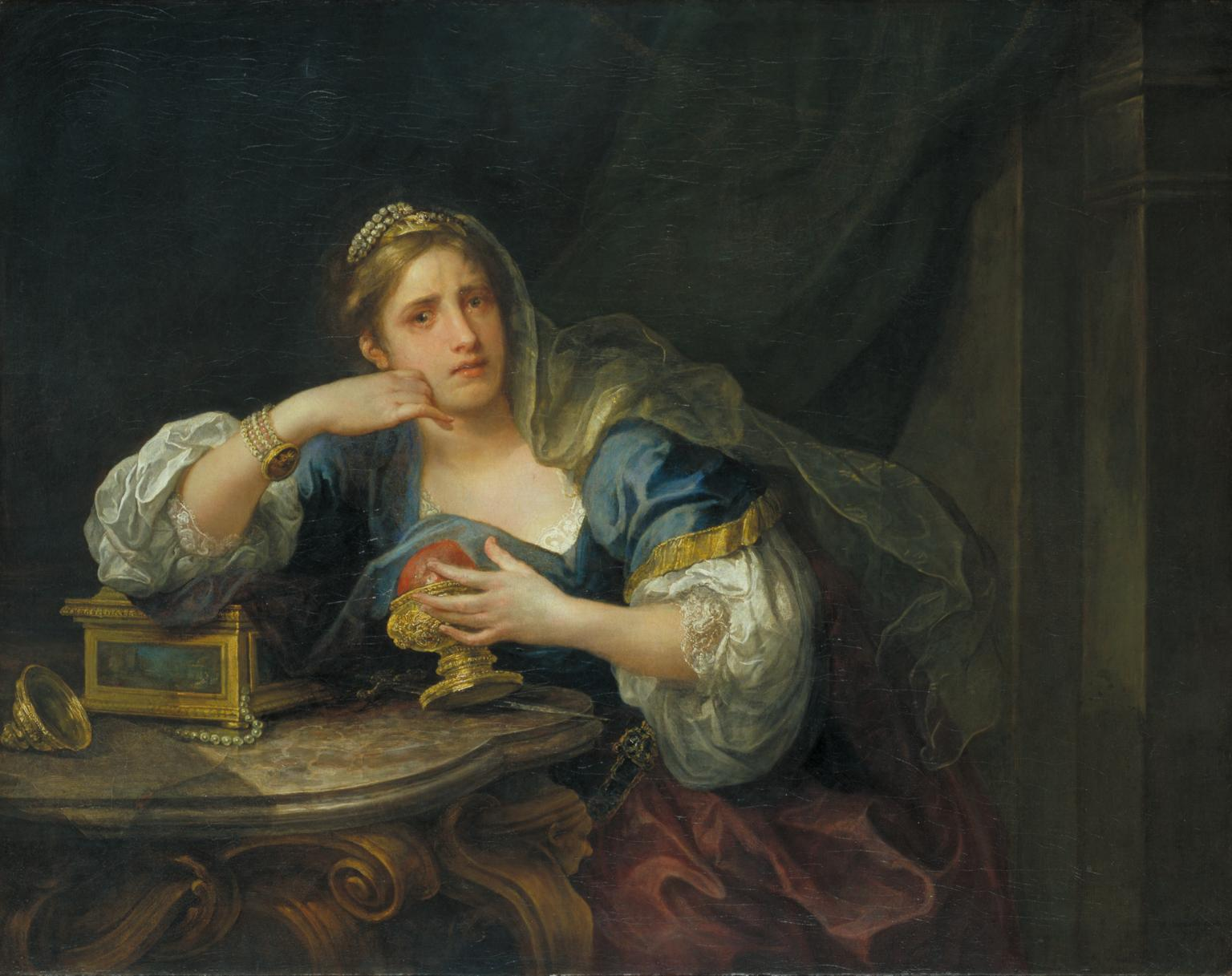
Sigismunda mourning over the Heart of Guiscardo by William Hogarth, left by James Hughes Anderdon to the nation in 1879, now in Tate Britain

Most of Anderdon's pictures were put up for sale after his death in 1879. His collection of engraved portraits, mostly from the Haviland Burke sale, was left to Alexander Anderdon Weston, a cousin. Weston sold it in 1904.

=== Extra-illustration ===
Anderdon illustrated and annotated, in a form of "grangerisation", two distinct runs of past summer exhibition catalogues of the Royal Academy. These went to the British Museum and the library of the British Academy. Their significance includes the fact that the annotations preserve content from sources that are no longer extant. Materials added include letters from artists to John Taylor and Rudolph Ackermann. Anderdon's motivations for his compilations are thought to be in part pedagogic, for the needs of art students.

The first catalogue set, dating from 1769 to 1849 and bound in 13 volumes, went to the British Museum, along with a set of catalogues of the Society of Artists of Great Britain, dating from 1760 to 1791 and bound in nine volumes.

The second catalogue set—which went to the Royal Academy—was based on the run of exhibition catalogues collected by the printmaker Edward Bell. Bell himself, it is thought, had already worked up an index to them.

In 1833, Anderdon bought from Gérard Jacob-Kolb (fr:Gérard Jacob-Kolb) a 38-volume extra-illustrated compilation of 1823, based on the Biographie universelle, ancienne et moderne and other sources. Anderdon then developed it under the name Collectanea Biographica, over most of the rest of his life, binding it in 1853 in 105 volumes. He left it to his half-sister Emma Mary, widow of Thomas Campbell Robertson, reportedly in 150 volumes. Her executors sold it in 1881 for a nominal price to the British Museum, where it is kept in the Keeper's Office of the Print Room.

A further work of extra-illustration was based on the Anecdotes of painters who have resided or been born on England (1808) of Edward Edwards, itself a supplement to a work by Horace Walpole. Again, it went to the British Museum.
