= Christon Bank railway station =

Disused railway station in Northumberland, England

Christon Bank
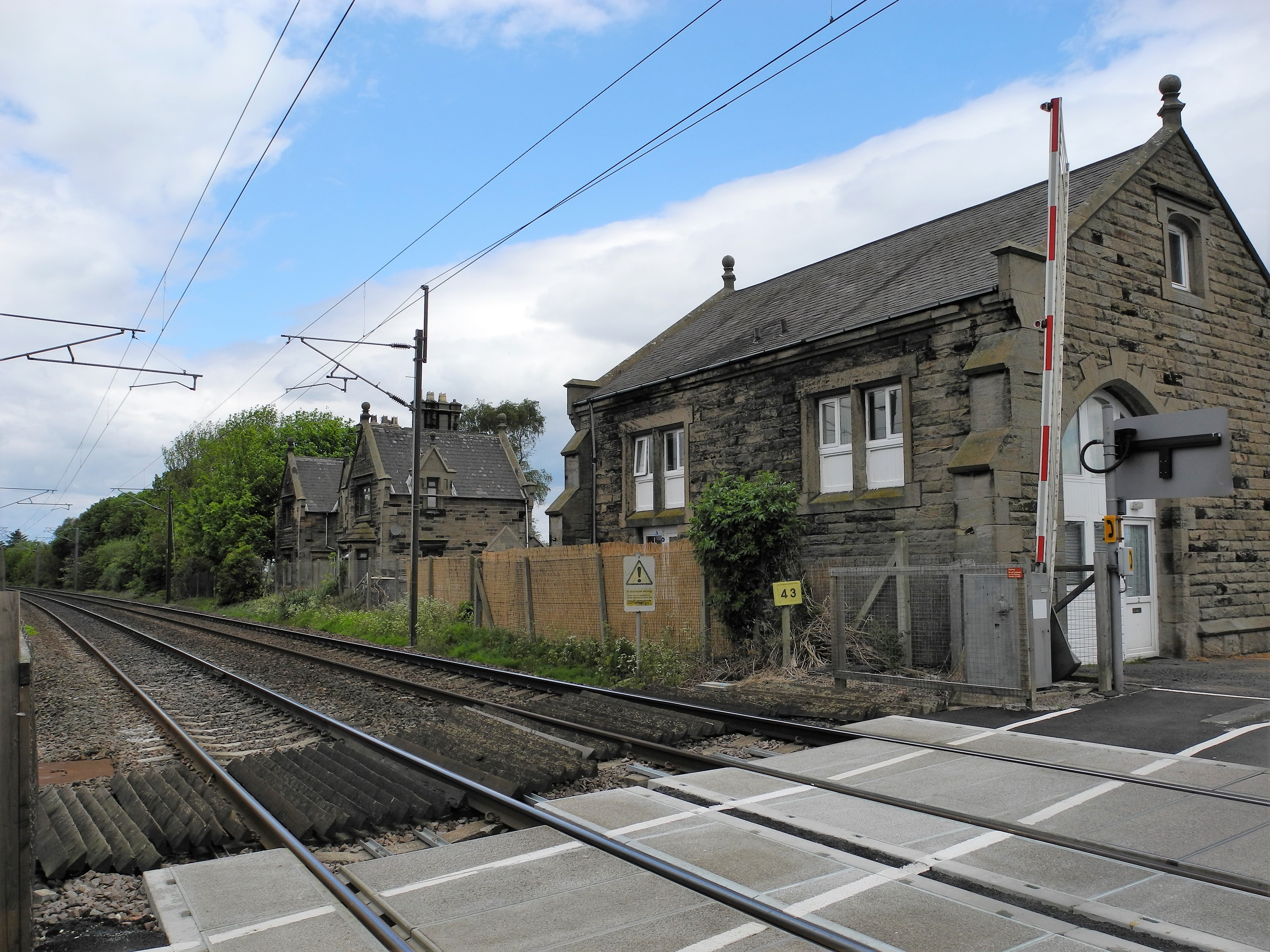
- The disused station buildings next to the level crossing.

General information
- Location: Christon Bank, Northumberland; England
- Coordinates: 55.5012°N 1.6644°W
- Grid reference: NU213231
- Platforms: 2

Other information
- Status: Disused

History
- Original company: York, Newcastle and Berwick Railway
- Pre-grouping: North Eastern Railway
- Post-grouping: LNER; British Rail (North Eastern)

Key dates
- 1 July 1847: Opened
- 5 May 1941: Closed to passengers
- 7 October 1946: Reopened
- 15 September 1958: Closed to passengers again
- 7 June 1965: Closed completely
Location

Christon Bank railway station served the village of Christon Bank, Northumberland, England from 1847 to 1965 on the East Coast Main Line.

== History ==
The station was opened on 1 July 1847 by the York, Newcastle and Berwick Railway; it was situated north of the level crossing on the B6347 at Springfield View. There were two sidings behind the north end of the down platform (these served the coal depot) and there was a goods warehouse adjacent to the up passenger platform and north of the level crossing. The station was one of the stations that closed for the Second World War. It was reopened by the London and North Eastern Railway on 7 October 1946. The Sunday services may have not been restored after it reopened. The station first closed to passengers on 15 September 1958 and closed completely on 7 June 1965.

Preceding station	Historical railways	Following station
Little Mill; Line open, station closed	York, Newcastle and Berwick Railway; East Coast Main Line	Fallodon; Line open, station closed
