= Sadr Diwani Adalat =

East India Company era court in India (c. 1772–1858)

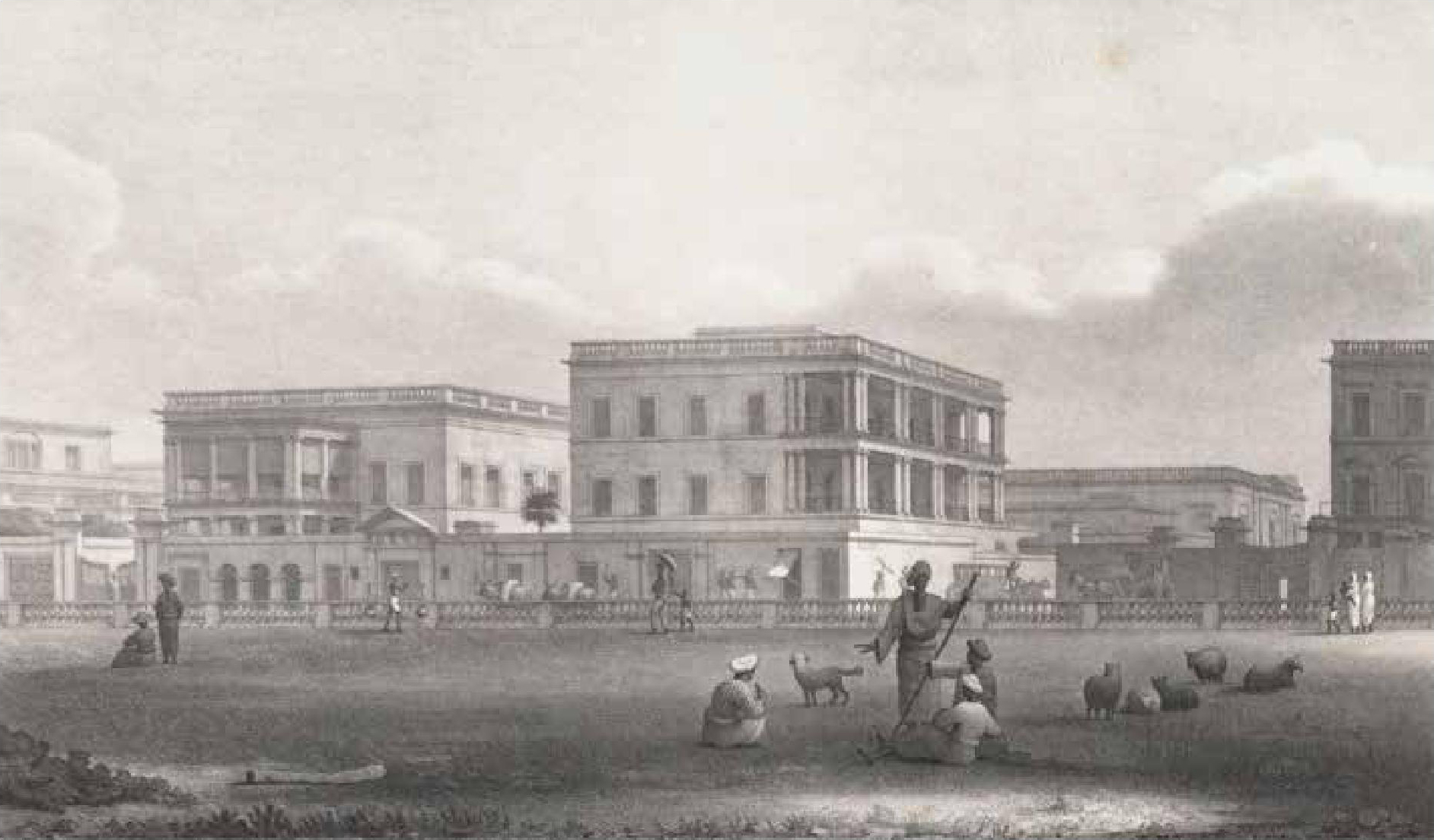
Sadr Diwani Adalat on Speke Street in 1833

The Ṣadr Dīwānī ʿAdālat (Urdu: صدر دیوانی عدالت, Bengali: সদর দেওয়ানি আদালত) (English: Sudder Dewanny Adawlut) was the Supreme Court of Revenue in British India established in 1772 at Calcutta by Warren Hastings, the first governor-general of Bengal. It was reformed in 1780 and again in 1793 by the British Parliament. The court's judges were the Governor General and Council Members of the East India Company, assisted by native judges and officers of revenue.

== Meaning ==
The term is in the Urdu:

- Sudder signifies literally "the breast"; the fore-court of a house; the chief seat of government, contradistinguished from Mofussil, or interior of the country; the presidency.
- Dewan is an ancient Persian word which was adopted throughout the Islamic world, meaning a powerful government official, minister or ruler.
- Adawlut, signifying "justice", "equity", a court of justice. The term Dewanny Adawlut signifies a civil court of justice. Foujdarry Adawlut signifies a criminal court of justice.

== History ==
The court was established to allow Hindus to be governed by Hindu law in matters of property, and not as before by Muslim law, although they were still subject to Muslim criminal law.

In each of the districts of British India, subordinate courts of revenue with definitive jurisdiction of up to 500 rupees, were established in which the judges were the relevant District Collector and his deputy and registrar, assisted by native officers. For cases exceeding 500 rupees, appeals were allowed to the Sudder Dewanny Adawlut.

The court was abolished after the Indian Rebellion of 1857.

== See also ==
- Sadr Faujdari Adalat
- Judiciary of India
