= James Fitzjames Duff =

English academic and Vice-chancellor (1898–1970)

Duff in 1950

Sir James Fitzjames Duff (1 February 1898 – 24 April 1970) was an English academic and Vice-chancellor of Durham University.

The son of James Duff Duff, he was educated at Winchester College then (after serving in the Royal Flying Corps from 1916–1917) at Trinity College, Cambridge. In the 1920s, he conducted pioneering research with Godfrey Thomson on the relationship between IQ and social class, now regarded as controversial. He was Professor of Education at the University of Manchester from 1932 to 1937. Whist there he was elected to membership of the Manchester Literary and Philosophical Society on 5 February 1929. Then became the Warden of Durham University (Note: Strictly speaking, his official title was "Warden of the Durham Colleges") from 1937 until 1960. During this time, he held the position of Vice‑chancellor for 6 periods of two years, in alternation with the Rector of King's College, Newcastle.

Duff was a member of several commissions and enquiries, including the Asquith Commission on Higher Education in the Colonies (1943–1945), the Elliot Commission on Higher Education in West Africa (1943–1944), and the University Education Commission of India (1948–1949).

He was a member and interim Chairman (Note: When Sir Arthur fforde resigned as Chairman of the BBC in January 1964, Duff took over the role until the appointment of Lord Normanbrook in May of the same year.) of the Board of Governors of the BBC from 1959 to 1965, Mayor of Durham City from 1959 to 1960, and Lord Lieutenant of Durham from 1964 to 1970.

Duff was knighted in 1949. He never married, and died in Dublin on 24 April 1970, aged 72.

== Publications ==
- Duff, James F.; Thomson, Godfrey H. (1923). "The Social and Geographical Distribution of Intelligence in Northumberland". British Journal of Psychology. 14 (2): 192–198. doi:10.1111/j.2044-8295.1923.tb00126.x.
- Duff, James F. (1929). "Children of High Intelligence, A Following-up Enquiry". British Journal of Psychology. 19 (4): 413–438. doi:10.1111/j.2044-8295.1929.tb00527.x.

== Notes ==
Academic offices
Preceded by Sir Robert Bolam	Vice-Chancellor & Warden of the University of Durham; 1937–1958; With: Lord Eustace Percy (from 1939 to 1951); Dr Charles Bosanquet (from 1952 to 1958)	Succeeded by Dr Charles Bosanquet
Honorary titles
Preceded by The 10th Baron Barnard	Lord Lieutenant of Durham; 1964–1970	Succeeded by The 11th Baron Barnard
