= John Proctor Anderdon =

English merchant (1760–1846)

John Proctor Anderdon (1760–1846) was an English merchant, banker, slave-owner, and art collector. He was elected a Fellow of the Royal Society in 1811.

== Life ==
He was the son of Ferdinando Anderdon and his wife Mary Hobart, and grandson of Dr. John Anderdon of Bridgwater, Somerset and his wife Mary Proctor. He became a merchant in London, and a partner with William Manning in Manning & Anderdon, in 1794. He brought into that partnership Charles Bosanquet, with whom he was already in business. Bosanquet left in 1810. Anderdon retired in 1816.

Anderdon owned Henlade Hall in Somerset from 1805, and Beech House in Hampshire from 1816. In the 1812 general election, he stood for the two-member Totnes constituency with George Francis Seymour in a sharp contest; but they were kept out by Thomas Peregrine Courtenay and Ayshford Wise. In Hampshire he was a philanthropist, helping to build school rooms.

During the 1830s Anderdon was an occupant of Farley Hall, Swallowfield. In the wake of the Slavery Abolition Act 1833, he was paid compensation for the enslaved people on his Seaforths estate in Antigua.

== Collector ==
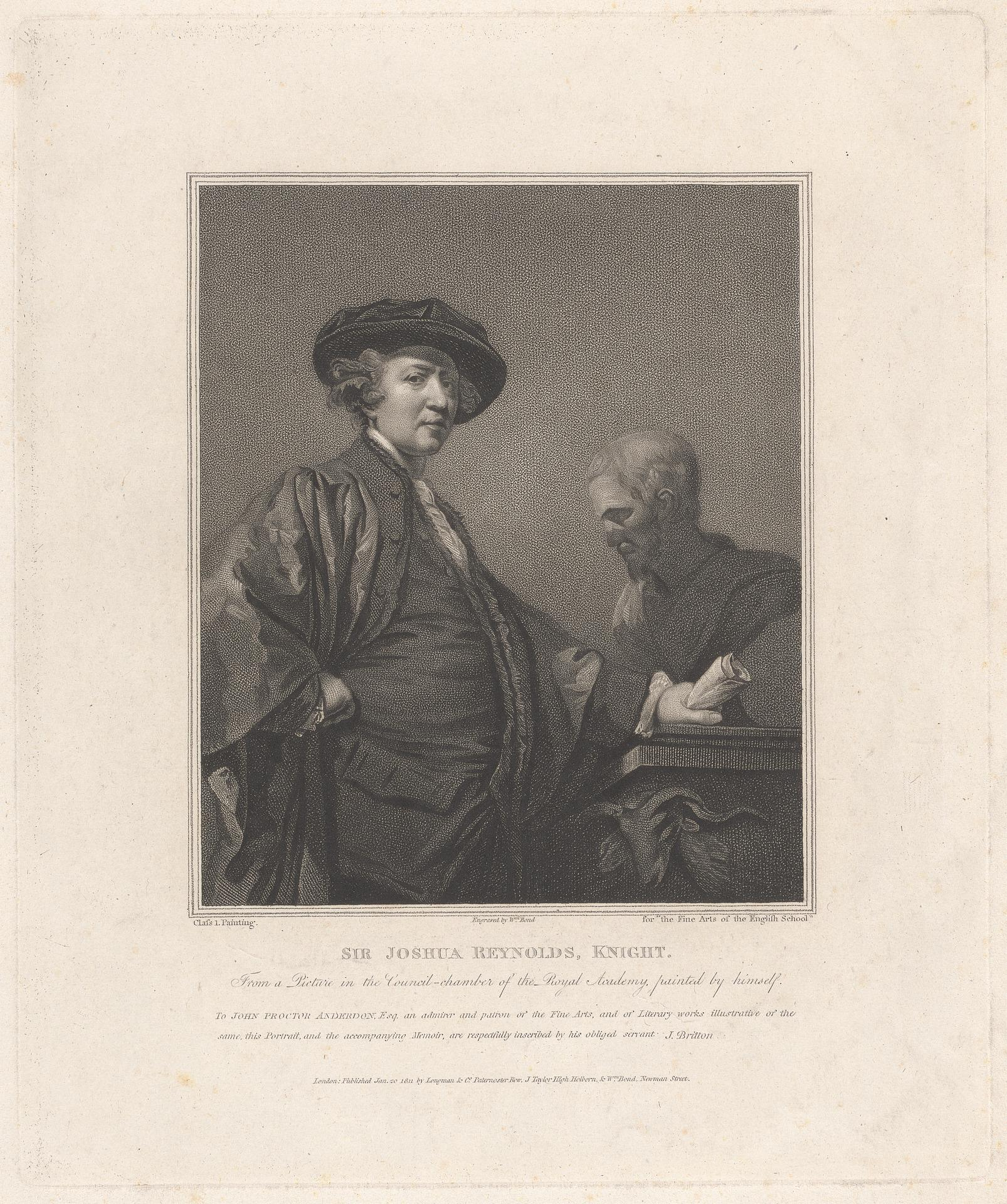
Illustration to The Fine Arts of the English School (1811), with dedication to John Proctor Anderdon

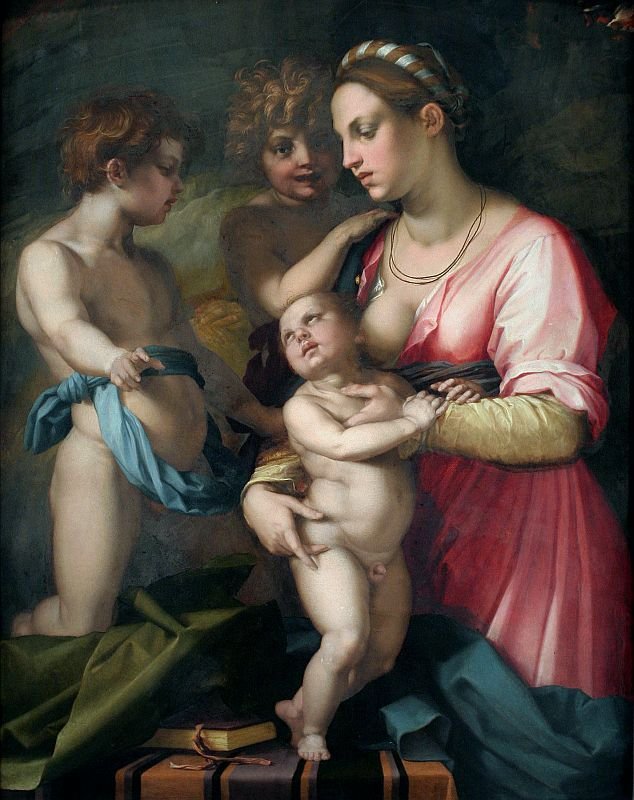
Charity by Andrea del Sarto, purchased in 1827 by John Proctor Anderdon, now in the National Gallery of Art

At the time of Anderdon's death, The Art Journal wrote of his collection that it "has for the last forty years been an object of interest to many amateurs and connoisseurs", had been seen also at his London house as well as his Berkshire residence, and had been noticed by George IV. A detailed description of his pictures in Beech House was published in 1818, in The Beauties of England and Wales.

In 1827, Anderdon bought Charity by Andrea del Sarto, from Prince Rospigliosi of Rome.

Anderdon's art collection was dispersed, put on sale under the terms of his will. There was a first sale in 1847: recorded sales include an Aelbert Cuyp and a Guercino. A second, smaller sale took place in 1851, mostly of works by Italian masters. A William Collins painting of children on a beach at Cromer, bought in 1836, passed to his son James Hughes Anderdon.

Anderson's library was also sold, in 1847. It included a manuscript of letters by Anna Maria van Schurman to André Rivet and Constantijn Huygens, from the library of Jona Willem te Water, that was bought by Richard Heber.

== Family ==
Anderson married firstly, in 1785, Anne Oliver, daughter of Thomas Oliver. Their children included:

- Thomas Oliver Anderson (1786–1856), barrister
- James Hughes Anderdon (1790–1879)
- John Lavicount Anderdon (1792–1874), third son.
- Freeman Anderdon
- Lucy, married Butler Claxton

Anne died in 1811. Anderdon married secondly, in 1812, Mary Hannah Casamajor, daughter of the merchant Justinian Casamajor (1746–1820). Their children included:

- Emma Mary, married 1852 Thomas Campbell Robertson as his second wife.
- Hobart Grant Anderdon, married firstly Eliza Roose, daughter of Sir David Roose, and secondly Mary Anne Parry.
- William Manning Anderdon.
