= John Anderdon =

19th-century English writer

- Born: John Lavicount Aderdon; 5 April 1792
- Died: 8 March 1874 (aged 81)
- Relatives: John Proctor Anderdon
- Writing career
- Subjects: Angling, religion
- Notable work: The River Dove

John Lavicount Anderdon (5 April 1792 – 8 March 1874) was an English writer, noted for his fishing literature and later his Christian publications.

== Biography ==
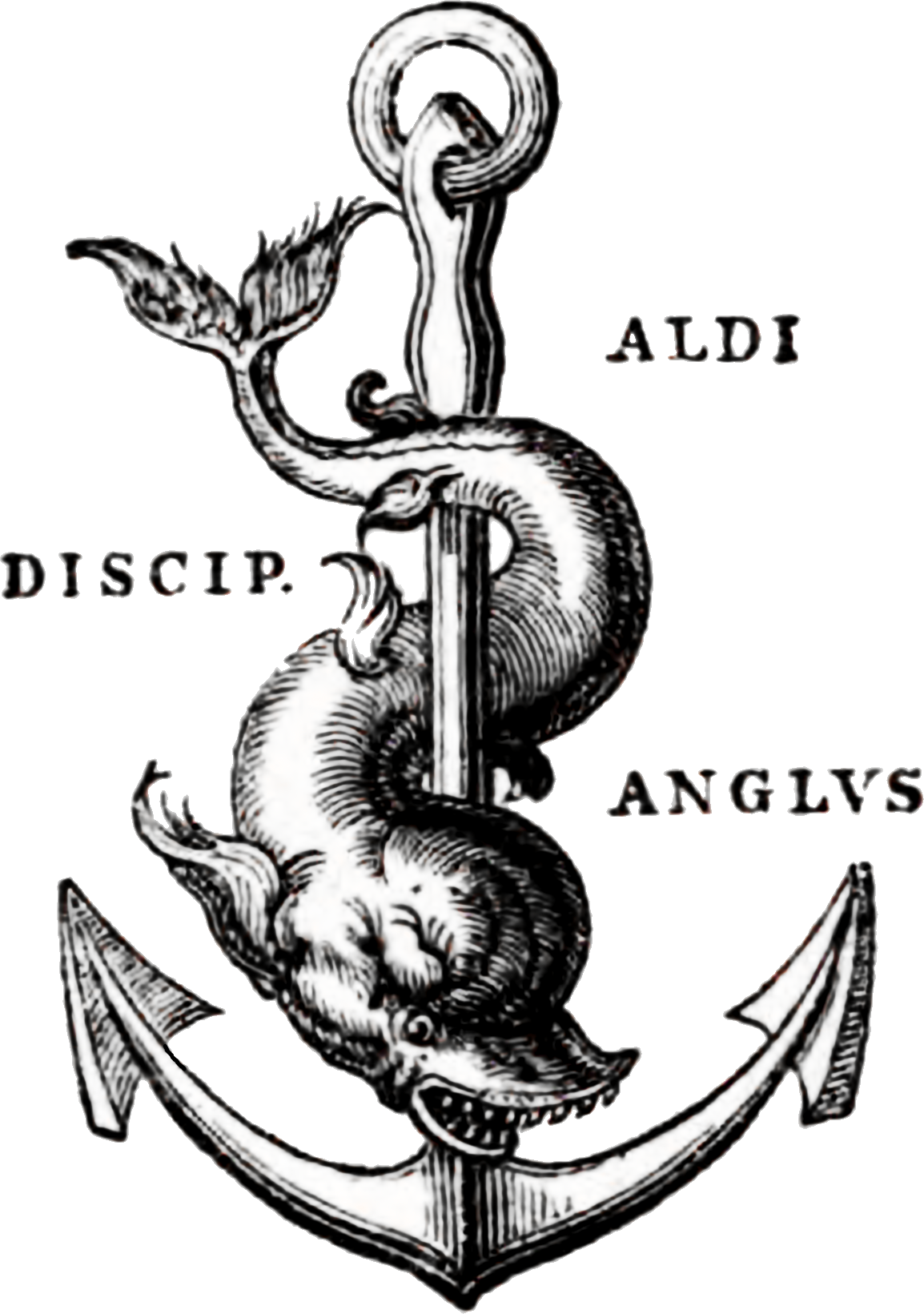
An artwork from The River Dove (1847).

The third son of John Proctor Anderdon, he was born at Bristol on 5 April 1792. After passing some time in the preparatory school of Dr. Nicholas at Ealing, he was removed to Harrow, but was taken from that establishment at a comparatively early age for office life in the business of Manning & Anderdon, in which firm he became a partner in 1823. He married Anna Maria, the second daughter of Wm. Manning, M.P. in 1816. Henry Edward Manning was his brother in law.

At the general election of 1818 he contested the borough of Penryn, in Cornwall, but was defeated, probably more to the regret of his friends than of himself.

Anderdon was an enthusiastic fisherman, and a walking tour through Dovedale, the country of Charles Cotton, one of the earliest professors of the art of angling, suggested the compilation of a volume (printed at first in 1845 for private circulation, but subsequently in 1847 for sale) on ‘The River Dove: with some quiet Thoughts on the happy Practice of Angling.’ Written in the orthodox dialogue of fishing literature and in the style of Isaac Walton, it contained many anecdotes of Cotton and his country life, with hints on the best mode of following his favourite pursuit. A series of views of Cotton's seat and the river Dove were taken under Anderdon's instructions and issued with a preface by his brother-in-law, Mr. F. Manning, in 1866. His next work was a sympathetic life of Bishop Ken, which was published under the pseudonym of ‘A Layman’ in 1851, and reprinted in 1854. He followed up this memoir of the saintly Ken with a selection, entitled ‘Approach to the Holy Altar’ (1852), from Ken's two devotional works, and a reprint (1852) of his ‘Exposition of the Apostles' Creed.’ For many years he was engaged in preparing, with copious extracts from divines of all kinds, a narrative of the life of our Lord. It was published anonymously in 1861 under the title of ‘The Messiah,’ and the substance of the work was reissued in 1866 in ‘The Devout Christian's Help to Meditation on the Life of our Lord Jesus Christ.’

Anderdon died on 8 March 1874. A posthumous work (‘Geron, the Old Man in Search of Paradise’), a collection of short discourses on a holy life, was published in 1877, with a biographical notice by Rev. George Williams.
