= Peter Holford =

English barrister (1720–1804)

Peter Holford (c.1720–1804) was an English barrister. He was a master in chancery from 1750 and a Fellow of the Royal Society.

== Background ==
He was the eldest son of Robert Holford (1686–1753) and his wife Sarah Vandeput, and grandson of Sir Richard Holford, master in chancery, and his second wife Elizabeth Stayner, daughter of Sir Richard Stayner RN.

The Holfords were chancery lawyers and landowners. Sir Richard Holford (died 1719) left an estate valued at £47,000. He was married three times, and had sons by each marriage. He bought the manor of Avebury from the heirs of John Stawell, 2nd Baron Stawell, who died in 1692. It went to Samuel, son of his third wife Susanna Trotman. On his death in 1730 it went to Richard, son of Sir Richard's son by his first marriage, to Sarah Crew(e), who died in 1742. It passed on to his brother Staynor Holford, who died in 1767. It then was bequeathed out of the Holford family. Robert Holford took advantage of the situation in 1742 to acquire from Richard the younger a farm at Beckhampton in lieu of a debt repayment. Distrust remained in the family.

John Habakkuk, citing the Holfords as an example, wrote:

Where the main line of a family in successive generations combined estate ownership with an active and remunerative career, a landed family could become very wealthy because of the opportunities of gain enjoyed [...]

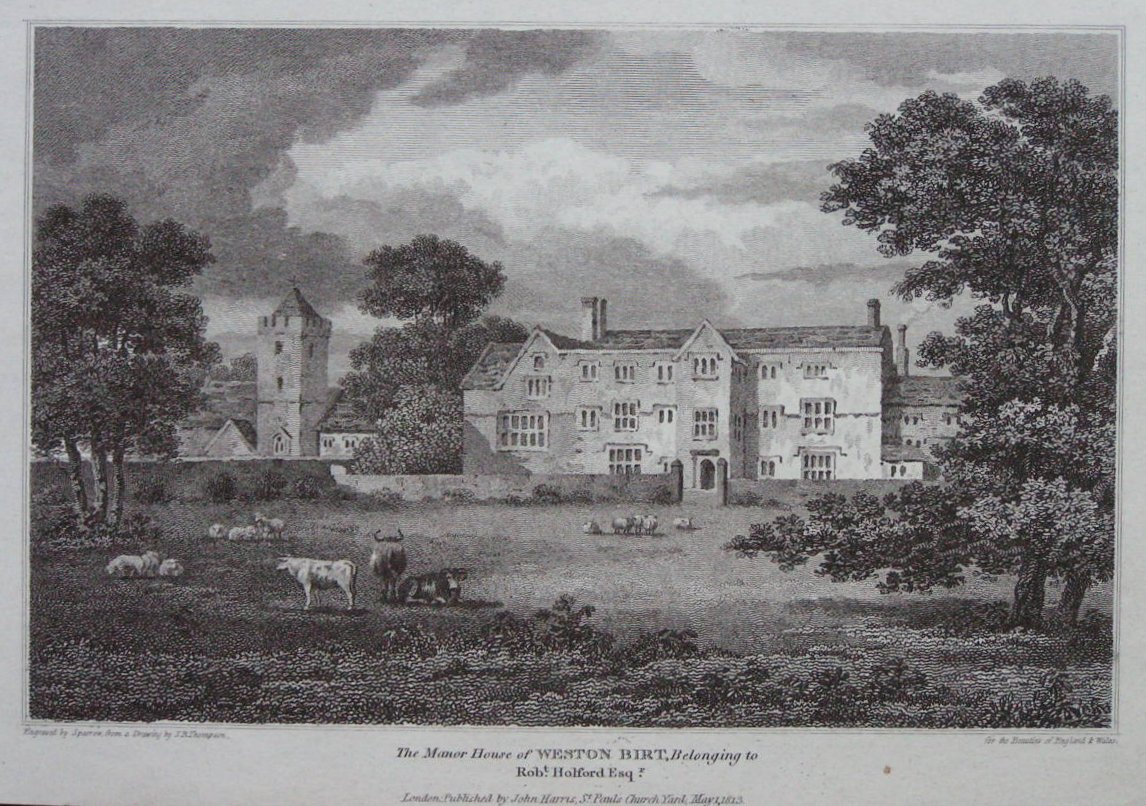
Westonbirt manor house, 1813 engraving when it belonged to Robert Holford son of Peter Holford, before a new house was built by George Peter Holford

The Westonbirt estate in Gloucestershire, a significant legacy of the Holford family, was an acquisition at the time of Sir Richard's first marriage. Westonbirt village was the scene in 1716 of a rough music incident that was homophobic, but also anti-clerical and directed against Holford as lord of the manor. Robert Holford continued his father's enclosure of land there in the 18th century.

== Life ==
Peter Holford was educated at Westminster School, and matriculated at St John's College, Cambridge in 1736. He entered Lincoln's Inn in 1735, and was called to the bar in 1740. He became a master in chancery in 1750, as replacement for his father.

Holford was elected to the Royal Society in 1747 (N.S.), and belonged to a dining club within it that met in house on The Strand, with a membership in which physicians predominated, and including Henry Cavendish.

In 1753 Holford took over the position of Governor of the New River Company, previously held by his father. Growth of London's population and industries in the later 18th century made the company very profitable. In 1770 Holford laid the foundation stone for its new offices in Fleet Street, on what had been the site of the Dorset Garden Theatre. An obituary notice in 1804 stated that Peter Holford had remained Governor until recently; and had died "immensely rich".

== Family ==
Holford married Anne Nutt, daughter of William Nutt of Buxted. They had two sons and two daughters:

- Robert Holford, died unmarried 1838.
- George Peter Holford, father of Robert Stayner Holford.
- Sarah, married as his second wife Sir Charles Grave Hudson, 1st Baronet.
- Charlotte, married in 1796 Charles Bosanquet.
