= Sadr Faujdari Adalat =

Ṣadr Faujdari ʿAdālat (Urdu: صدر فوجداری عدالت, Bengali: সদর ফৌজদারি আদালত) were courts of criminal justice in Mughal and British India. The Faujdari criminal courts are considered the beginning of Hindu and Muslim "personal law" separated from the jurisdiction of civil law in colonial India – a juridical norm preserved as a key principle of democratic secularism in postcolonial India.

== History ==
The chief institution of this criminal court system was known as the Ṣadr Nizami ʿAdālat ("Administrative Court of Justice") in Calcutta of Bengal Presidency. This chief Administrative Court in Calcutta Criminal oversaw criminal courts in outlying districts and in Madras and Bombay Presidencies. The system was instituted by Warren Hastings, the British governor-general, in 1772, in his reforms of the East India Company's growing sovereign powers.

They were technically operated by Muslim legal scholars (a qazi or mufti). Hindus were tried with the expertise of a pandit (or scholar of Hindu tradition). These princely nawabs in various parts of India were either independent of, beholden to, or in collusion with British colonial authorities. The Sadr Faujdari Adalat courts were the local juridical arm of the Mughal "princely" rulers (nawabs), whose governmental authority co-existed alongside the British in late 18th and 19th centuries. Ultimately, over the succeeding century after their establishment, the local Indian authorities of the Sadr Faujdari Adalat were gradually supplanted by the British. The high criminal court, like its counterpart for civil jurisdiction — the Sadr Diwani Adalat - was abolished after the Indian Rebellion of 1857 (known by the British as "the Mutiny"), and its powers and jurisdiction were transferred to new high courts of judicature set up by the Indian High Courts Act of 1861.

== See also ==
- Sadr Diwani Adalat
- Judiciary of India
