= Rennington =

Village in Northumberland, England

Coordinates: 55.4599°N 1.6651°W

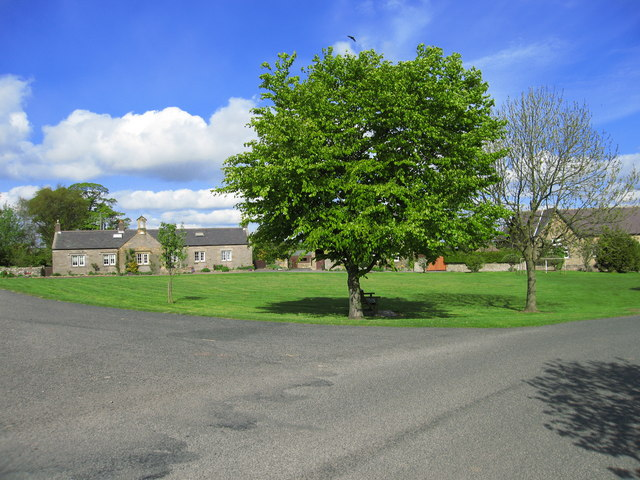
- Rennington Village Green

- Location within Northumberland
- Population: 336 (2011 census)
- OS grid reference: NU 213 185
- Civil parish: Rennington
- Unitary authority: Northumberland
- Ceremonial county: Northumberland
- Region: North East
- Country: England
- Sovereign state: United Kingdom
- Post town: ALNWICK
- Postcode district: NE66
- Police: Northumbria
- Fire: Northumberland
- Ambulance: North East
- UK Parliament: North Northumberland

Rennington is a village and civil parish in Northumberland, England about 4 miles (6 km) north of Alnwick. The parish includes the village of Rock and the hamlets of Broxfield and Stamford. In 2011 the parish had a population of 366.

== Governance ==
Rennington is in the parliamentary constituency of Berwick-upon-Tweed. From 1974 to 2009 it was in Alnwick district.

Rennington was formerly a township and chapelry in the parish of Embleton, in 1866 Rennington became a separate civil parish, on 1 April 1955 the parishes of Broxfield, Rock and Stamford were abolished and merged with Rennington.
