= John Brand (political writer) =

English clergyman and writer

- Born: Norwich, England
- Died: 23 December 1808
- Education: Caius College, Oxford

John Brand (died 1808) was an English clergyman and writer on politics and political economy.

== Life ==
Brand was a native of Norwich, where his father was a tanner. Entering at Caius College, Oxford, he distinguished himself in mathematics, taking his B.A. degree in 1766 his M.A. degree in 1772. In 1772 he published 'Conscience, an ethical essay,' a poem which he had written in a competition for the Seatonian Prize. Having taken orders and held a curacy he was appointed reader at St Peter Mancroft, Norwich, and was afterwards presented to the vicarage of Wickham Skeith in Suffolk. To eke out his scanty income he contributed to the periodical press, particularly to the British Critic, papers on 'Political Arithmetic.' Some of these attracted the notice of Lord-chancellor Loughborough, and he presented Brand in 1797 to the rectory of St. George's, Southwark, which he held until his death on 23 December 1808.

== Writing ==
Brand was a Tory, and his Toryism coloured all his writings. In his first pamphlet, Observations on some of the probable effects of Mr. Gilbert's Bill, to which are added Remarks on Dr. Price's account of the National Debt (1776), his object was to reply to the economists who bewailed the increase of local taxation and of the national debt. He draws a distinction between fiscal charge and fiscal burden. As long as prices steadily rose he argued that though more money might be taken out of the taxpayer's pocket, the quantity of commodities which the sum levied by taxation would purchase steadily decreased, and that thus if 'burden' were interpreted to be the amount of commodities of the power of purchasing which the community was deprived by taxation, its increase need not be and had not been at all proportionate to the increase of charge. In this way he proved to his own satisfaction that the burden of the amount paid to the creditors of the notion at the Peace of Utrecht was nearly the same as when he wrote, and that the alarm of Dr. Price and others at the increase of the national debt was wholly baseless.

Of such other of Brand's pamphlets on economic subjects as are in the library of the British Museum, the most interesting is his Determination of the average price of wheat in war below that of the preceding peace, and of its readvance in the following. Here he sought to prove on theoretical grounds that war lowers while peace raises the price of wheat, and he then proceeded to endeavour to confirm the soundness of this position by an appeal to statistics.

Of Brand's political pamphlets, the chief appears to be his Historical Essay on the Principles of Political Associations in a State, chiefly deduced from the English and Jewish histories, with an application of those principles in a comparative view of the Association of the year 1792 and of that recently instituted by the Whig Club (1796). The intended drift of this elaborate disquisition was that the existing Tory associations were praiseworthy and useful.

The main authority for Brand's meagre biography is chapter xxiv. of William Beloe's Sexagenarian, which is devoted to him, but in which, as usual in that work, the name of the subject of the notice is not mentioned. Brand's name is, however, supplied together with what appears to be a complete list of his separate publications (the library of the British Museum is without several of them), in the memoir of him in John Nichols's Illustrations of the Literary History of the Eighteenth Century, vi. 528-34, which is an expansion of the chapter in the Sexagenarian. Nichols enumerates thirteen pamphlets in all.
