= Charles Bosanquet =

English official and writer

Charles Bosanquet (23 July 1769 – 20 June 1850) was an English colonial official and writer.

== Life ==
He was born at Forest House, Essex, the second son of Samuel Bosanquet and Eleanor Hunter. He was educated at Newcome's School in Hackney, and then in Switzerland.

Bosanquet went into trade as a West Indies merchant, initially with John Proctor Anderdon. They were joined by William Manning. He left the partnership in 1810. He served as sub-governor of the South Sea Company from 1808–38, and governor from 1838–50. From 1823–36 he was chairman of the exchequer bill office. He served as Justice of the Peace and Deputy Lieutenant for the county of Northumberland, and was High Sheriff of Northumberland in 1828. In 1819 he was lieutenant-colonel of light horse volunteers, later rising to colonel. He maintained a London residence at the Firs, Hampstead, and spent his later years at his estate of Rock Hall near Alnwick in Northumberland. He died there on 20 June 1850, and is buried in its church.

== Economic works ==
Bosanquet held to the "Anti-Bullionist" position, now identified with the real bills doctrine. In 1810 he published his major work, Practical Observations on the Report of the Bullion-Committee. Inflationary pressure in 1809 had prompted David Ricardo to write three letters to the Morning Chronicle, the first of which appeared on 29 August. The public attention aroused by these letters and subsequent pamphlets led Parliament to appoint a select Committee to “Inquire into the cause of the high price of bullion, and to take into consideration the state of the circulating medium, and of the exchanges between Great Britain and foreign parts.” This "Bullion Committee", along with Ricardo, took the "Bullionist" position, stating that inflation had resulted from over-issue of currency, primarily by the Bank of England but also by country banks; and that as a means of preventing over-issue, the Bank of England should resume convertibility of the pound into gold. In Practical Observations, Bosanquet criticised its report as being "altogether at variance with (the opinions) of the persons selected for examination," of relying on propositions that "are not generally true, and do not therefore form a solid foundation for the abstract reasoning of the Report," and of relying upon facts that "are erroneously stated; and, when corrected, lead to opposite conclusions."

The Anti-Bullionist position was that over-issue would be avoided if banks issued paper money only in exchange for "solid paper, given, as far as we can judge, for real transactions." Any over-issue of paper money, in the words of the Bank directors, "would revert to us by a diminished application for discounts and advances on government securities." This latter principle became known as the "Law of the Reflux". Ricardo likened the issues of the Bank of England to a gold mine, insofar as an increased issue of paper money would have the same effect on prices as increased production of gold. Bosanquet countered that the Bank of England issued paper money only on loan, and that since loans must ultimately be repaid, the newly issued paper money would not cause inflation. Newly mined gold, in contrast, did not have to be repaid, and therefore would cause inflation. On these grounds Bosanquet denied the analogy between gold and paper money.

Ricardo's Reply to Mr. Bosanquet (1811) was described by John Ramsay McCulloch in 1845 as "perhaps the best controversial essay that has ever appeared on any disputed question of Political Economy." In response to Bosanquet's statement that the supply of currency was adequately limited by the Bank's policy of making loans only for "solid paper", Ricardo answered that as long as the Bank is willing to lend, borrowers will always exist, so that there is no practical limit to the over-issue of money, unless the Bank either maintains convertibility, or otherwise acts to maintain the quantity of money within reasonable bounds. Ricardo argued that the simple fact of the pound's depreciation was proof of its over-issue—a circular argument that nevertheless carried the day.

Bosanquet published no reply to Ricardo. Keith Horsefield (1941) wrote of "the lamentable decline from the counsels of Samuel Bosanquet in 1783 to the apologia of Charles Bosanquet in 1810," while Richard Sidney Sayers (1952) observed that "poor Bosanquet is left cutting a very sorry figure." But Ricardo's victory over Bosanquet was in fact far from complete. His arguments concerning money issued on loan were resurrected during the Currency School/Banking School debates of the 1840s. The issue has remained unsettled, and featured prominently in the Monetarist/Keynesian debates of the 1960s and 1970s. Beginning in the 1980s, the real-bills viewpoint has seen a small revival of interest (e.g., Sargent (1982), Sproul (1998)).

=== Other works ===
In 1806 and 1807 Bosanquet produced three short works on commercial themes:

- Letter on the Proposition submitted to the Government for taking the Duty on Muscavado Sugar ad valorem (1806).
- A Letter to W. Manning, Esq., M.P., on the Depreciation of the West India Property (2nd edition 1807). In this work Bosanquet blamed the depreciation on ill-considered taxes and other restrictions placed on the colony. He proposed that British breweries should use colonial sugar and that the British navy should use colonial rum. An answer from William Spence, Radical Cause of the Present Distresses of West India Planters Pointed out (1807) provoked further controversy, in many publications including James Mill, Commerce Defended (1808).
- Thoughts on the Value to Great Britain of Commerce in general, and of the Colonial Trade in particular (1807), in which he pointed out the benefits yielded by the West India trade.

== Family ==
Bosanquet married Charlotte Anne Holford, daughter of Peter Holford, on 1 June 1796. He fathered seven children, three of whom survived him:

- Robert William Bosanquet (1800–1880), cleric, married firstly in 1834 Frances Pulleine (died 1835), daughter of Henry Percy Pulleine of Crakehall, and secondly in 1838 Caroline Macdowall, daughter of Day Hort McDowall. The philosopher Bernard Bosanquet was his youngest son.
- George Henry Bosanquet (1801–1800), cleric, author of The Sorrows of Deafness (1839). He married in 1850 Louisa Dashwood, daughter of William Bateman Dashwood and Louisa Bode.
- Mary Anne (died 1867), married 1836 the Rev. Edward Feilde.
