= Rock, Northumberland =

Village in Northumberland, England

Coordinates: 55.478°N 1.677°W

Rock
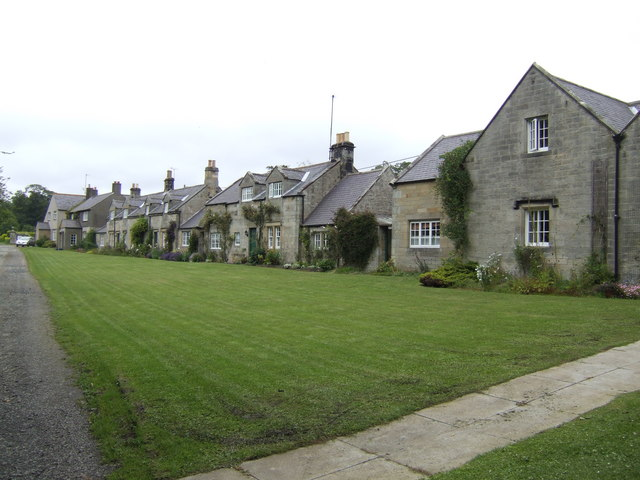
- Rock village

- Location within Northumberland
- OS grid reference: NU205205
- Civil parish: Rennington
- Unitary authority: Northumberland
- Ceremonial county: Northumberland
- Region: North East
- Country: England
- Sovereign state: United Kingdom
- Post town: ALNWICK
- Postcode district: NE66
- Dialling code: 01665
- Police: Northumbria
- Fire: Northumberland
- Ambulance: North East
- UK Parliament: Berwick-upon-Tweed

Rock is a village and former civil parish, now in the parish of Rennington, in Northumberland, England about 5 miles (8 km) north of Alnwick. In 1951 the parish had a population of 162.

== Buildings ==
The single street has on one side cottages and gardens; on the other, an ornamental lake. At the end is a little Norman church; and beyond that, the battlements and towers of Rock Hall. The sundial and the inscribed stone in the end wall of the schoolroom were originally part of a residence of the Salkelds which stood on the site. The Hall was then their seat – their coat of arms still remains above an old, blocked doorway to the right of the modern entrance. Later a branch of the Fenwicks lived here. It was a John Fenwick of Rock that was hanged for the murder of Mr. Ferdinando Forster at the White Cross, Newgate Street, Newcastle, in 1701.

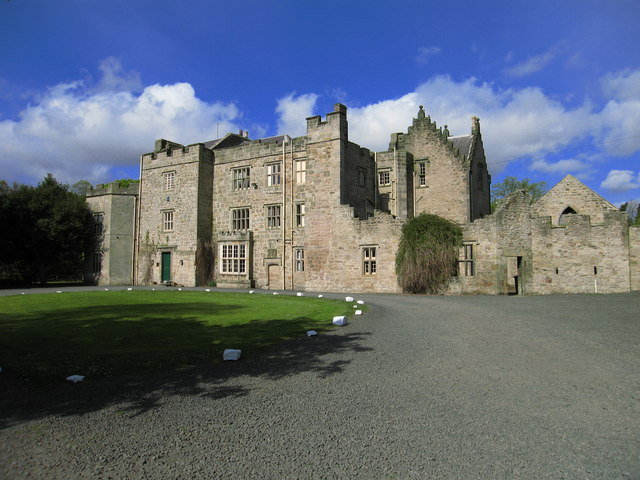
Rock Hall, Northumberland

The Hall dates to the 12th or 13th century. The south wing was converted into a defensible tower house in the late 14th or early 15th century, and the whole was remodelled in the 17th century, but the house was left ruinous by a fire in 1752, before being restored and extended by Charles Bosanquet in the 19th century.

The same Charles Bosanquet also restored the church. The west door of this splendid little edifice is a rich piece of original Norman work. The gargoyles are noteworthy. The memorial brass within to Colonel John Salkeld does not mention that the worthy colonel killed a Swinburne of Capheaton near the gates of Meldon and only just escaped hanging.

== Governance ==
Rock is in the parliamentary constituency of Berwick-upon-Tweed. Rock was formerly a township and chapelry in Embleton parish, from 1866 Rock was a civil parish in its own right until it was abolished on 1 April 1955 and merged with Rennington.

== Religious sites ==
The church is dedicated to St Philip and St James.
