= Rolling stock of the Kent & East Sussex Railway (heritage) =

The Kent & East Sussex Railway has hosted a variety of heritage rolling stock since the line was closed by British Railways in 1961.

== Current stock ==
=== Steam locomotives ===
Number (& Name)	Class	Status	Notes	Image
No. 3 Bodiam (originally LBSCR No. 70 Poplar)(Currently Carrying 70)	LB&SCR A1 Class	In service - Operational as of June 2022	Built as LBSC No. 70 Poplar and entered into service on 4 December 1872. Sold to Rother Valley Railway for £650 in May 1901 having covered 664,108 miles (1,068,778 km) in service. Withdrawn in 1931 but restored to service in 1933 using parts from No. 5 Rolvenden. New A1X boiler fitted in 1943. Renumbered 32670 in 1948 when the K&ESR was absorbed into British Railways. Worked on the Hayling Island Branch Line and withdrawn in November 1963. Purchased privately, arrived back on the KESR on 10 April 1964.^{A} Withdrawn in January 2017 for overhaul which was undertaken at the North Norfolk Railway. Returned to the KESR in May 2022 for final finishing and testing, before re-entering service in June 2022.	
No. 8 Knowle (original LBSCR No. 78)(Currently 2678)	LB&SCR A1 Class	In service – Operational as of November 2020	Built in 1880 as LBSCR No. 78, it first worked on the London suburban lines before moving to the Hayling Island branch. Renumbered 678 in 1907 and converted to push-pull motor train working. Fitted with new A1X boiler in 1911. Stored upon becoming part of the Southern Railway in 1923, it was sold to the Isle of Wight Railway in 1929 and renumbered and renamed W4 (later W14) Bembridge. Returned to the SR in 1936 and renumbered 2678. Hired by the KESR in 1940 and remaining there until 1958. Renumbered 32678 by British Railways, it hauled the final passenger train on the KESR in 1954 with classmate No. 32655 Stepney. It returned to Hayling Island in 1958 and remained there until 1963, when it moved to Brighton ending its working career in 1964 as a coal stage pilot. In service, it covered 1,411,436 miles. It was sold to Billy Butlin and displayed at his Butlin's Minehead until moved to the West Somerset Railway. In 1998, it returned to the KESR and returned to service in May 1999. Returned to service in November 2020, fitted with its extended Isle of Wight bunker and out-shopped in SR Black.	
No. 11 (originally SECR No. 753)	SECR P Class	Under major overhaul	Built by the SECR in 1908, one of the first two of a class of eight locomotives. Originally numbered 753. Design is similar to the Terriers. Into service in February 1909. In 1915, it was requisitioned for military service with the Railway Operating Division, Royal Engineers. Sent to Boulogne. Returned in 1916 having sustained damage in a collision while at work there. Renumbered 556 by the Southern Railway in 1925. Employed in the construction of the Wimbledon and Sutton Railway in 1928. Hired to K&ESR in 1936 and again in 1938, and again in 1947. Renumbered 31556 by British Railways. Withdrawn from service in April 1961, the longest serving P Class locomotive. Sold to James Hodson & Sons, Robertsbridge and renamed Pride of Sussex. Rail traffic to the mill ceased on 1 January 1970 and the locomotive was sold to the KESR. Withdrawn from service in 2011 in need of a major overhaul.^{A}	
No. 12 Marcia	Peckett 1287 Class 0-4-0T	In service - Operational as of March 2022	Built in 1923 as works number 1631/1923 for Hardman & Holden Ltd, Salford. Donated to K&ESR upon withdrawal in 1962. Worked until withdrawn in the autumn of 1982.^{A} Restoration took 28 years. Withdrawn after issues were discovered with the inner firebox. Repairs were completed in March 2022, and the engine is now running in. Put up for auction in April 2024, with bids starting at £30,000. The engine was purchased in June 2024, by a K&ESR volunteer, Andy Hardy, and returned to the railway.	
No. 14 Charwelton	Manning Wardle Modified Class 0 0-6-0ST	Under overhaul	Works number 1955/1917. Built for Park Gate Iron & Steel Co Ltd, Charwelton, Northamptonshire. Transferred to Sproxton Quarry in 1942 and worked there until closure of the railway in 1963 and sold out of service. Arrived on the K&ESR in 1963 and used occasionally on works trains until 1976, when it left the railway for restoration. Returned to service on the K&ESR in May 1982 and withdrawn in May 1983 for repairs to its axle boxes.^{A} Returned to traffic in 1991 and withdrawn in 2001. Restoration work was completed in August 2009 but was withdrawn in 2017 following a serious fault with the boiler.	
No. 19 Norwegian (originally No. 376)(Currently No. 376)	NSB 21c	Awaiting overhaul	Built by Nydqvist & Holm AB, Trollhättan, Sweden as works number 1163/1919. One of eight locomotives of Class 21c. Used on the Kongsvinger Line initially, later ending its days working a snowplough on the Nordland Line. Arrived on the K&ESR in 1971. Returned to service in 2013 after a major overhaul and operated until 2020, when it was withdrawn requiring another overhaul.^{A} Now numbered 376.	
No. 21 Wainwright (Currently No. 300 Frank S. Ross.)	S100	Awaiting overhaul	Built for the United States Army Corps of Engineers as No. 1960, and sent to the UK under Lend-Lease. Stored at Newbury Racecourse. One of fourteen purchased by the Southern Railway and sent to the Melbourne Military Railway for running in. Entered service with the Southern Railway in April 1947 as USA Class number 70. Renumbered 30070 by British Railways. Worked at Southampton Docks. Withdrawn, and entered Departmental service as DS238 at Ashford Wagon Works. Withdrawn in June 1967 and sold to Woodham Brothers, Barry, Wales in March 1968. Developed a hot box en route and dumped at Tonbridge. Sold to K&ESR in August 1968 and delivered the next month. It was restored to working order in 1994, outshopped in BR Green livery as No. DS238 and was then painted in WD Grey as No. WD1960 towards the end of its boiler ticket. It was withdrawn from service in 2004. Returned to service in December 2017 following overhaul and outshopped in Longmoor Military Railway Lined Blue as No. 300 Frank S. Ross.^{A} Withdrawn in early 2022 pending serious boiler repairs.	
No. 22 Maunsell	S100	Undergoing major overhaul	Built for the United States Army Corps of Engineers as No 1968, and sent to the UK under Lend-Lease. Stored at Newbury Racecourse. One of fourteen purchased by the Southern Railway and sent to the Melbourne Military Railway for running in. Entered service with the Southern Railway in November 1947 as USA Class number 65. Renumbered 30065 by British Railways. Worked at Southampton Docks. Withdrawn, and entered Departmental service as DS237 at Ashford Wagon Works. Withdrawn in April 1967 and sold to Woodham Brothers, Barry, Wales in March 1968. Developed a hot box en route and dumped at Tonbridge. Sold to K&ESR in August 1968 and delivered the next month. When restored to service in 1974 it was the first large locomotive to enter service on the railway in preservation. Overhauls have been completed in 1981, 1997 and 2008 (which saw the fitting of a new firebox) and the locomotive was withdrawn in January 2017 for another ten-yearly overhaul.	
No. 23 Holman F. Stephens	Austerity	In storage awaiting major overhaul	One of a batch of fourteen Bucket Class locomotives built in 1952/53 as war reserve stock. Works number 3791/1952. Originally WD 191, later WD 91. Stored initially on the Longmoor Military Railway and entered service at Bicester Military Railway where it carried the name Black Knight. Into store in 1962 at Long Marston, then to Shoeburyness in December 1967. Withdrawn from service in August 1968 having run for 23,178 miles (37,301 km). Sold out of Army service, arrived on K&ESR in February 1972.^{A}	
No. 25 Northiam	Austerity	In service - Operational as of April 2018	One of a batch of fourteen Bucket Class locomotives built in 1952–53 s war reserve stock. Originally WD 197, later WD 97. Was at Longmoor Military Railway in 1957, and withdrawn from Bicester Military Railway in 1977, where it had carried the name Sapper. Arrived on K&ESR in September 1977. Renamed Northiam in April 1982, renaming ceremony performed by Andrew Gardner. Returned to service in April 2018 following a major overhaul.^{A}	
No. 30 (originally GWR No. 1638) Currently 1638	GWR 1600 Class	Under repair off site	Built in 1951. An example of a small GWR pannier tank, although actually built by British Railways. Given the number 1638, it was working in Wales when it was withdrawn in August 1966. On 25 November 1967, it moved to Buckfastleigh to enter preservation on the Dart Valley Railway. Returned to service in 2016 after a ten-yearly overhaul, wearing BR Black livery. Went to Leaky Finders in early 2022 for repairs to the axle boxes and motion.	
No. 32 (originally GWR No. 6619)	GWR 5600 Class	In storage awaiting overhaul	Built in 1928 at Swindon Works. It served in Wales until it was withdrawn in 1963. It was sent to Woodham Brothers scrapyard and was rescued in 1974. It was saved because of the relatively good condition of the boiler and not many inside parts had been removed. It returned to service in 1984. It spent most of its preserved life on the North Yorkshire Moors Railway before being moved to the Embsay and Bolton Abbey Steam Railway in summer 2011, it remained on the line until it was sold to the KESR in 2012. An initial pre-overhaul assessment has been carried out, and components such as tanks have been found to be life expired.	
No KESR number currently (originally GWR No. 5668)	GWR 5600 Class	Awaiting major restoration	Built in 1926 at Swindon Works. It worked in Wales until its withdrawal in September 1964. It was sent to Woodham Brothers scrapyard in November that year, and it was rescued in August 1987 and moved to the Pontypool and Blaenavon Railway. It was transferred in 2013 to the owners of No. 4253 as part of a deal that saw spares for 4253 bought from the previous owner, and it arrived on the railway in August.In ex-Barry scrapyard condition. The boiler has already been professionally stripped of asbestos to prepare for a boiler lift. It is currently stored at Wittersham Road station. Construction of components such as side tanks has started, while other components have been preserved.	
No KESR number currently (originally GWR No. 4253)	GWR 4200 Class	Under major restoration	Built in 1917 at Swindon Works. Withdrawn in April 1963 and sent to Woodham Brothers scrapyard at Barry, Glamorgan in August 1963. To Pontypool & Blaenavon Railway in August 1987.	

=== Diesel locomotives ===
Number (& Name)	Class	Status	Notes	Image
No. 40 (formally No. 16)	British Thompson Houston Company Bo-Bo	Under repair	No 40, formerly No 16 Diesel Electric locomotive. Surviving member of a class of three built in 1931 by BTH for service at Ford Dagenham in Essex. Built to the London, Midland and Scottish Railway loading gauge as their duties involved crossing the ex-London, Tilbury and Southend Railway main line. Was numbered 1 at Ford. Withdrawn on 5 July 1966 and arrived at Tenterden on 7 July 1966. Hired to James Hodson & Sons, Robertsbridge Flour Mills in 1967. Hauled the last train from Robertsbridge to Bodiam in February 1972 prior to the track being lifted on that section.^{A}	
No. 41	Ruston & Hornsby 0-4-0DE	In service as Rolvenden Yard Pilot	Built as works number 423661/1958 for Rowntree Mackintosh, York where it carried the number 1. Donated to the K&ESR in 1987. Repainted into original Rowntree's Green in 2018. Number 41 in the K&ESR stocklist.	
No. D.3174 / BR TOPS No. 08 108 / KESR No. 44 Dover Castle'	British Rail Class 08	Stored. Overhaul not progressing at present.	Ex British Railways 13174, D3174 and 08 108. Built at Derby Works in 1955. Withdrawn in 1984 and sold to Dower Wood Mill, Newmarket. Purchased for preservation in 1991 and moved to the East Kent Railway where it worked the first train when the preserved line reopened. To the K&ESR in November 1992. Number 44 Dover Castle in the K&ESR stock list.	
No. D.2023	British Rail Class 03	In service as the Tenterden Yard Pilot.	No. 46. built at Swindon Works in 1958 as D2023. Withdrawn in 1971 and sold to Tees & Hartlepool Port Authority. Renumbered 5 and employed at Middlesbrough docks until transferred to Grangetown in 1980. Sold to K&ESR / TREATS in 1983, arrived on 14 August.^{A}	
No. D.2024	British Rail Class 03	Currently at Tenterden being stripped down to assess for overhaul. Not in service.	No. 47. built at Swindon Works in 1958 as D2024. Withdrawn in 1971 and sold to Tees & Hartlepool Port Authority. Renumbered 4 and employed at Middlesbrough docks until transferred to Grangetown in 1980. Sold to K&ESR in 1983, arrived on 4 September.^{A}	
No. D.9504	British Rail Class 14	In service.	Built at Swindon Works in 1964. Allocated to 50B Hull Dairycoates until late 1968. Industrial service with NCB at Lambton, Philadelphia, Boldon, Burradon and Ashington Collieries	
No D.7594 / BR TOPS No. 25 244	British Rail Class 25	Awaiting restoration. This loco has never run on the K&ESR since the formation of the preservation society.	Built by Darlington Works in 1964. British Railways number D7594, later 25 244.	
No D.3429 / BR TOPS No. 08 359	British Rail Class 08	In service.	Owned by The Diesel Electric Shunter Company, the loco is based at Rolvenden MPD and is in service. Worked most of its life in South Wales before being withdrawn in 1984. Built by Crewe Works in March 1958. British Railways number D3429, later 08 359.	

=== Diesel Multiple Units (DMUs) ===
Number (& Name)	Class	Status	Notes	Image
No. 20 (BR number No. W20W)	"Flying Banana"	Under restoration since 1983.	No 20. Ex GWR No 20 and BR W20W. Built in 1940 for the Great Western Railway. Powered by two AEC diesel engines. Purchased in 1966 having spent some time in store at Worcester. Delivered by rail on 3 April 1966 to Robertsbridge as an out-of-gauge load on the Hastings Line. Formed the first train when the line reopened to fare-paying passengers in 1974. Withdrawn in 1980 suffering from bodywork corrosion.^{A} As of late July 2018, cab frames assembled and right-hand side panels placed.	
BR Nos. M50971 and E51571	British Rail Class 108	In service.	Diesel Mechanical Multiple Unit. Comprising DMBS M50971 and DMCL E51571. Arrived on the K&ESR in 1993.	

=== Passenger stock ===
Origin	Number	Type	Notes	Photograph
Metropolitan Carriage, Wagon and Finance Company	184	Pullman Kitchen First	Built in 1926 as a Restriction '0' carriage for use on the Hastings Line. Converted in 1932 to composite at Preston Park Pullman workshops. Withdrawn in 1939 and re-entered service in 1947, reconverted to all-first configuration. Rebuilt as a buffet car in 1958 and repainted into green livery. Sold by Pullman to Southern Region of British Railways in 1960 and renumbered 7874 and painted in green livery. Used on boat trains between London and Southampton Docks. Withdrawn in December 1963 and arrived at Roberstbridge in September 1964. Used as a bookstall in early years of the preservation society.^{A} Restoration enabled due to a grant from the Millennium Commission and completed in February 2005. Number 51 Theodora in the K&ESR stocklist.	
Metropolitan Carriage, Wagon and Finance Company	185	Pullman Kitchen First	Built in 1926 as a Restriction '0' carriage for use on the Hastings Line. Converted in 1932 to composite at Preston Park Pullman workshops. Withdrawn in 1939 and re-entered service in 1947, converted to a buffet first. Used on the Hastings Line until the introduction of the Hastings units (6B, 6L and 6S). Sold by Pullman to Southern Region of British Railways in 1960 and renumbered 7877 and painted in green livery. Used on boat trains between London and Southampton Docks. Withdrawn in December 1963 and arrived at Roberstbridge in September 1964. Used as a refreshment carriage in early years of the preservation society.^{A} Restored at Rye in 1999. Number 52 Barbara in the K&ESR stocklist.	
Southern Railway	4432	Brake First	Designed by Richard Maunsell. Built at Eastleigh Works in 1933 as an unclassified brake to Diagram 2654A. Built to Restriction '1'. Used on Continental boat trains and later on services between Tonbridge and Reading and the Oxted Line. Purchased in November^{A} 1965 and restoration completed in June 2003. Number 53 in the K&ESR stocklist.	
Southern Railway	4443	Brake First	Designed by Maunsell. Built at Eastleigh Works in 1933 and almost identical to No.53. Built to Restriction '1'. Presently in Maunsell Green Livery. Number 54 in the K&ESR stocklist.	
Southern Railway	5153	CK	Built at Ashford Works in 1933 to Diagram 2302. Built to Restriction '1'. Formed part of 8 carriage set No. 467 used on the Kent Coast and Eastbourne services. Withdrawn in January 1965. In service on K&ESR until 1977 but now withdrawn awaiting a major overhaul. Number 55 in the K&ESR stocklist.^{A}	
Southern Railway	5618	CK	Built at Eastleigh Works in 1931 to diagram 2302. built to Restriction '1'. Formed part of 4 carriage set No. 189 used on services between London, Eastbourne and Hastings. Withdrawn in January 1965.^{A} As of 29 July 2018, 5618 is under a repaint, minor overhaul and a new roof being fitted. Painting into SR Green had already commenced by then, exterior mainly complete, interior yet to be completed. Now back in service as of 17 February. Originally number 26 and now number 56 in the K&ESR stocklist.^{A}	
British Railways	1869	Mark 1 RMB	Built in 1962 at Wolverton to Diagram 99. Purchased by the Llangollen Railway in 1993. To K&ESR in November 1998. Number 59 in the K&ESR stocklist.	
South Eastern and Chatham Railway	1100	Birdcage Brake Composite	This carriage was built as Ashford Works in December 1910. Built to Restriction '0' loading gauge which enabled it to be used on the Hastings Line. It formed part of a three carriage set of coaches numbered 113 by the Southern Railway. The centre coach was scrapped in the late 1950s due to accident damage. Sold to the Longmoor Military Railway in 1943 and remained in use until closure in 1970. Delivered by rail to Robertsbridge in September 1970. Length 54 feet 1 inch (16.48 m). As built it seated 7 second class and 48 third class passengers. Painted in BR Crimson as S3368S for a few years, now painted in an SE&CR lined livery. Number 61 in the K&ESR stock list.^{A}	
London and South Western Railway (LSWR)	959	Lavatory Composite	It was built at Eastleigh Works in 1907 to diagram 274. Renumbered 3078 in 1919 and to 5065 in 1925. Arrived at K&ESR by rail in 1968. It is a long-term restoration project. Number 62 in the K&ESR stocklist.	
British Railways	25446	Mark 1 SK	Built in 1962 at Wolverton to Diagram 146. Purchased in 1977. Number 63 in the K&ESR stocklist.	
British Railways	3753	Mark 1 TSO	Built at Doncaster Works in 1953 to Diagram 93. Withdrawn in 1977. Number 64 in the K&ESR stocklist.	
London, Chatham and Dover Railway	91	6-wheel Third	Built in 1899 at Longhedge Works as a five compartment 6-wheel Third as a replacement for the original 91. Later numbered 3045 (SECR, 1905) and 1666 (SR, 1926). A medium- to long-term restoration project. Will be restored as a 4 wheeler. Number 66 in the K&ESR stocklist.	
London, Chatham and Dover Railway	91	4-wheel Third	Built in 1862 at Longhedge Works as a five compartment 4-wheel Third. Moved to K&ESR from the Spa Valley Railway. A medium- to long-term restoration project.	
North London Railway	109	4-wheel Brake Third	Built by the London and North Western Railway at Wolverton^{A} in 1911. Renumbered 7965 then 27687 by the London, Midland and Scottish Railway. Sold in the 1930s to the Royal Arsenal Railway, Woolwich. Carried Winston Churchill while in service there. Sold to the K&ESR in 1964, the first carriage to be preserved on the K&ESR.^{A} Restoration completed in July 2004 with money obtained from a bequest and a Millennium Commission grant. Originally number 31, then 101 and now 67 in the K&ESR stocklist.	
British Railways	4355	Mark 1 TSO	Built by BRCW in 1956. Purchased by K&ESR in 1999. Currently undergoing a heavy body overhaul. Expected to enter service 2010. Now painted in crimson and cream Number 68 in the K&ESR stocklist.	
British Railways	1955	Mark 1 RU	Body built in 1960 at Swindon Works to Diagram 23. Underframe built at Ashford Works. Withdrawn at York in 1977 and purchased by K&ESR in 1979. Into service on 1 August 1981, named Diana as it was the year of the marriage of Diana Spencer to Prince Charles. Entered service in Pullman livery. Carried HM the Queen Mother in June 1982.^{A} Later carried Carmine & Cream livery but now back in Pullman Livery. Number 69 in the K&ESR stocklist.	
London, Chatham and Dover Railway	49	4-wheel Brake Second	Built in 1889 at Longhedge. Relegated to a Brake Third in 1894 and renumbered 105. Renumbered 3059 in February 1901 on the formation of the South Eastern and Chatham Railway. Withdrawn c1918 and body sold in 1921 to a farmer at Kingsnorth. Donated to K&ESR and arrived in August 1976.^{A} Body placed on modified underframe of Southern Railway PMV 1119 in March 1980. Number 70 in the K&ESR stocklist.	
British Railways	9269	Mark 1 BSO	Built in 1960 at Doncaster Works to Diagram 183. Withdrawn in the early 1970s and entered Departmental Service^{A} as DS975269 and later 041332. Purchased in 1981 and entered service on the K&ESR on 29 August 1982. Has carried Pullman livery but now in BR (S) Green. Number 73 in the K&ESR stocklist.	
British Railways	9254	Mark 1 BSO	Built in 1956 at Doncaster Works to Diagram 183. Donated to K&ESR by British Rail in 1981 after an approach by a group of members to Sir Peter Parker. 1982 was the Year of the Disabled and they wanted to provide a carriage suitable for use by disabled people. 9254 had just been withdrawn from service at Llandudno Junction and was selected for conversion. Converted by apprentices at Stewarts Lane and delivered by rail to Tonbridge on 19 May 1982. The former guards compartment now houses a wheelchair accessible toilet and a public address system is fitted to enable commentary to be given to blind passengers. Inaugurated into service by HM the Queen Mother. Number 75 Petros in the K&ESR stocklist. The carriage is notable for two firsts, the first privately owned and liveried carriage to run on British Rail and the first to be specially converted for use by disabled passengers^{A}	
Great Eastern Railway	197	6-wheel Brake Composite	Built in May 1887 to Diagram number 219 in Lot number F20 Later renumbered C63239-379. Withdrawn from service in September 1928. Used as a chalet at Wisbech. Restoration started in 1981. Mounted on the underframe of LMS Stove R BGZ 32991. Entered service in March 2006. Number 81 in the K&ESR stocklist.	
London and North Western Railway (LNWR)	ED33	6-wheel Inspection Saloon	Built by the LNWR at Wolverton in 1889. Had no LNWR number, this practice was not one taken up by the origin company. Numbered ED33, later renumbered 45021 and withdrawn in March 1940. Sold to the Melbourne Military Railway in May 1940 and renumbered 3005. Transferred to the Longmoor Military Railway in 1945. Donated to the Transport Trust in 1970 and delivered to the Severn Valley Railway in 1971. Sold to a private owner and arrived on the K&ESR in 1985. Sold to the Tenterden Railway Company c2003. As of 29 July 2018, this coach is in Tenterden Town Workshop for attention to paid to rotting wood and side panelling. Number 82 in the K&ESR stocklist.	
London and South Western Railway (LSWR)	11	Invalid Saloon	Built in 1910 at Eastleigh Works. Renumered 4195 in 1919 and 7803 under the Southern Railway. Sold to Longmoor Military Railway in 1938 becoming Army No.119. Arrived in Tenterden in 1985. It is a long-term restoration project. Number 83 in the K&ESR stocklist.	
South Eastern and Chatham Railway	177	First Saloon	Built in 1900 to Diagram number 4330 and converted in 1908 to an Invalid Saloon. Renumbered 7913 and sold to the Army in 1936. Used on the Longmoor Military Railway. Donated for preservation in 1970, to the Severn Valley Railway in 1971. Sold to K&ESR Locomotive Trust in 1985. Restoration completed in March 1999. Number 84 in the K&ESR stocklist.	
British Railways	4640	Mark 1 TSO	Built at York in 1957, to K&ESR 1986. Number 85 in the K&ESR stocklist.	
British Railways	15927	Mark 1 CK	Built at Wolverton in 1956, to K&ESR in 1987 from Mid Hants Railway. As of 29 July 2018, 15927 was in Tenterden Town carriage workshops. Number 86 in the K&ESR stocklist.	
South Eastern and Chatham Railway	2947	4-wheel Third	Built by the SECR to a London, Chatham and Dover Railway design. Body grounded in 1921 and used as a bungalow at Ashford. Donated when site was being redeveloped in 1986 to K&ESR Ashford Group. Restored by August 1995, being placed on the modified underframe of SR PMVY 1228. Number 88 in the K&ESR stocklist.	
Southern Railway	3557	Third Brake	Built by the Metropolitan Carriage & Wagon Company in 1923, arrived at K&ESR in 1993. Presently awaiting restoration. SECR Design, 'Matchboard' Continental. Number 97 in the K&ESR stocklist.	
London, Chatham and Dover Railway	108	Brake Third	Similar to No 70, built in 1888 as a second brake, renumbered 3062 by SE&CR. Withdrawn 1921, to K&ESR in 1986. Restoration started 2006, hoped to enter service in 2010. Number 98 in the K&ESR stocklist.	
District Railway	100	4-wheel Third	The history of this carriage is largely unknown. The District Railway sold an 1864-built 8-wheel carriage bearing the number 100 to a man in Dymchurch in December 1907. The body was placed on the modified underframe of Southern Railway PMV No.1225 in 1979. As of 29 July 2018, No. 100 has been repainted into a teak livery with District Railway lettering.	
Metropolitan Railway	353	4-wheel First	Built in 1892 by Cravens for the Metropolitan Railway. Sold to the Weston, Clevedon & Portishead Railway by 1907 as WC&PLR No.12. Sold in 1940 after closure as a body. Restored by September, 2011. Took part in Metropolitan Railway's 150 anniversary in January 2013.	
British Railways	21275	Mark 1 Brake Corridor Composite	Built in 1964 at Derby to Diagram number 172 in Lot number 30732. Formerly part of Balfour Beauty's weed killing train. One of the last built BR BCKs. Moved to the K&ESR in June, 2017. Now used as a static glamping coach at Bodiam station.	
British Railways	W21245	Mark 1 Brake Corridor Composite BCK	Built in 1961 at Swindon to Diagram 172 in Lot number 30668. Formally part of Inter City BN91 Charter Train Set and last owned by Riviera Trains. Moved to K&ESR April 2022.	

=== Non-Passenger stock ===
Origin	Number	Type	Notes	Photograph
Southern Railway	1808	Luggage Van	Built at Lancing Carriage Works in 1942 to Diagram 3103. Originally a luggage van but reclassified as a Parcels and Miscellaneous Van by British Railways. Overhauled at Doncaster in June 1979 but withdrawn in January 1980 when British Rail wound down their parcel service.^{A} Purchased in 1981 and converted in 1984 to a travelling kitchen for use on Wealden Pullman dining trains. For some reason, now in place of Cavell Van 132 at Bodiam. Number 74 in the K&ESR stocklist.	
Southern Railway	1745	General Utility Van	Built in 1938 at Eastleigh Works to Diagram 3101. Later reclassified as a Covered Carriage Truck. Arrived on the K&ESR in March 1982.^{A} Restored in 2002. Number 76 in the K&ESR stocklist.	
South Eastern and Chatham Railway	132	GUV	Main article: Cavell Van This vehicle is the prototype GUV, designed by Maunsell. Built in 1919 at Ashford Works to Diagram 960. It was used to carry the bodies of Edith Cavell, Charles Fryatt and The Unknown Warrior between Dover and London. Purchased in 1991 and stored at Hoo Junction until 1992. Moved to the K&ESR then to the Rother Valley Railway, Robertsbridge in 1994. Back to the K&ESR in 2004. Gifted to the Colonel Stephens Society in 2010 by the late John Miller. Number 93 in the K&ESR stocklist. In December 2009, an appeal was launched to raise £35,000 to restore the van. The fully restored van was unveiled at Tenterden on 10 November 2010.	
LMS	37011	Covered Carriage Truck	Built in 1938 by Metro Cammell to Diagram 2026 in lot no. 1154. It was preserved in 1985 on the Nene Valley Railway. Went to K&ESR in June, 1999. In use at Tenterden by the Railway Equipment & Traction Co (owners of K&ESR-based Class 108) as a stores van/workshop.	

=== Freight stock ===
Origin	Number	Type	Notes	Photograph
South Eastern Railway	1010	6-wheel 20-ton brake van	Built in July 1898 to Diagram 1558. Originally numbered 1010 by the South Eastern Railway and renumbered to 2010 by the South Eastern and Chatham Railway. Became Southern Railway 55371 and was sold in 1946 to the Royal Aircraft Establishment, Farnborough. Purchased in 1965 on closure of the Royal Aircraft Establishment Railway.^{A} Originally built with a single balcony. No 102 in the K&ESR stocklist.^{A}	
British Army	AD49022	25-ton brake van	Built in 1941 by the Southern Railway at Lancing to Diagram 1570 for the Ministry of Supply. Used by the Army at the Longmoor Military Railway. Purchased by the K&ESR in 1969. Restored as SR 56945.^{A} When photographed it was numbered SR 56495. Overhauled and re-entered service in July 2006 in British Railways livery and numbered M360327. The original vehicle that carried this number was acquired by British Railways from the Shropshire and Montgomeryshire Railway upon nationalisation. Number 103 in the K&ESR stocklist.^{A}	
Lancashire and Yorkshire Railway	5945	20-ton brake van	Built by the London and North Western Railway to Diagram 17B. Numbered 5945 by the L&Y, became LMS No. 135945 and was sold to Longmoor Military Railway where it was numbered AD49025. Purchased by the K&ESR in 1969. Number 104 in the K&ESR stocklist.^{A}	
Great Western Railway	103686	12-ton ventilated van "Mink B"	Built in 1923 at Swindon Works. Acquired in 1972 from Hodson's Mill, Robertsbridge. Restored in 1979. Doors have now been removed, likely used as spares, now stored at Rolvenden. Number 105 in the K&ESR stocklist.^{A}	
London, Midland and Scottish Railway		Banana Van	Acquired from Hodson's Mill, Robertsbridge in 1972.^{A} Body later removed as it was in a poor condition. Cosmetically restored as a 2-plank open wagon in 2000. Number 107 in the K&ESR stocklist.^{A}	
		8-ton 2-plank open wagon	Acquired from Reed's Paper Mills, Aylesford in 1964.^{A} Cosmetically restored as a 2-plank open wagon. Number 114 in the K&ESR stocklist.^{A}	
Shell-Mex	7522	14-ton tank wagon	Built in 1943 by Hurst Nelson & Co Ltd, Motherwell. Donated by Shell in 1972. Number 118 in the K&ESR stocklist.^{A}	
Barry Railway	1151	10-ton gunpowder van	Built in 1913 by S J Claye Ltd, Long Eaton. Classified as an Iron Mink by the Great Western Railway and renumbered 37449. Withdrawn in 1949 and sold to Tunnel Cement Ltd, Grays where it was renumbered 4. Purchased by K&ESR in 1977. Now stored at Rolvenden. Number 120 in the K&ESR stocklist.^{A}	
London and North Western Railway	28966	15-ton flatrol	Built in 1911 at Earlstown. Probably numbered 28966 by the LNWR. Sold by British Railways in January 1950 to Tunnel Cement Ltd, Grays. Purchased by K&ESR in 1977. Number 121 in the K&ESR stocklist.^{A}	
London, Midland and Scottish Railway	515184	12-ton ventilated van	Built in 1940 by the Southern Railway at Lancing Works to Lot 1282. Entered Departmental Service with British Rail as 082986, used as a stores van at Thornton Heath. Withdrawn in December 1979 and arrived on the K&ESR in May 1980. Number 128 in the K&ESR stocklist.^{A}	
Air Ministry		14-ton tank wagon	Built in 1941 by R Y Pickering & Co, Wishaw. Later sold to Esso and numbered 2338. Donated to the K&ESR in May 1982. Number 132 in the K&ESR stocklist.^{A} Currently painted in Frittenden Treacle Mines livery.	
Midland Railway		Van	Built in 1886. Sold to the Royal Navy and used at HM Dockyard Chatham. Numbered 564 by the Royal Navy. Sold to K&ESR in April 1983. Number 135 in the K&ESR stocklist. On display at Tenterden Town Station.^{A}	
Lancashire and Yorkshire Railway		10-ton box van	Built in August 1922 at Newton Heath. Sold to the Royal Navy and used at HM Dockyard Chatham. Numbered 589 by the Royal Navy. Sold to K&ESR in April 1983. Number 136 in the K&ESR stocklist.^{A}	
Great Northern Railway		20-ton bogie bolster	Built by the Great Northern Railway. Later sold to the Royal Navy and used at HM Dockyard Chatham. Numbered 606 by the Navy. Purchased by the K&ESR in April 1983. Number 137 in the K&ESR stocklist.^{A}	
London Midland and Scottish Railway	501348	12-ton van	Built in 1934 at Wolverton Works as part of Lot 768 to Diagram 1891. Sold to the Royal Navy and used at HM Dockyard Chatham. Numbered 675 by the Royal Navy. Sold to K&ESR in September 1983. Number 138 in the K&ESR stocklist.^{A}	
Southern Railway	63013	15-ton four-plank dropside open	Built in February 1937 at Ashford Works to diagram 1773. Used by British Rail at Redbridge Sleeper Depot in latter years. Purchased in February 1984. Number 143 in the K&ESR stocklist.^{A}	
British Railways	DB993605	24-ton ballast hopper wagon	Built at Shildon Works to Lot No. 3255. Purchased by K&ESR in February 1984. Number 144 in the K&ESr stocklist.^{A}	
	083317	Bogie flat wagon	Originally built as a bogie bolster wagon, converted in the early 1950s to a match truck for DS1770. Latterly in service at Ashford as internal user vehicle 083317. Withdrawn in 1983 on closure of BREL Ashford. Arrived on the K&ESR 3 February 1984.^{A} Number 146 in the K&ESR stocklist. Converted in December 1988 to a bogie flat wagon	
Southern Railway	11530	8-plank Open wagon	Built in 1937 at Ashford Works to Diagram 1400. Arrived on K&ESR in spring 1984. number 148 in the K&ESR stocklist.^{A}	
British Railways	B483720	13-ton five-plank open Wagon	Built in 1949 at Ashford Works as part of Lot 2061 to Diagram 1/033. Arrived on K&ESR in January 1988. Number 153 in the K&ESR stocklist.	
British Railways	DB993620	Hopper wagon	Built in 1959 at Shildon as part of Lot 3255 to Diagram 1/587. Arrived on K&ESR in January 1988. Number 154 in the K&ESR stocklist.	
Southern Railway	5916	13-ton 5-plank open Wagon	Built in 1943 at Ashford Works. Arrived on K&ESR in January 1988. Number 155 in the K&ESR stocklist.	
British Railways	B460168	13-ton open wagon	Built in 1955 at Ashford Works as part of Lot 235 to Diagram 1/019. Arrived on K&ESR in January 1988. Number 157 in the K&ESR stocklist.	
British Railways	B460575	13-ton open wagon	Built in 1952 at Ashford Works as part of Lot 2351 to Diagram 1/019. Later renumbered 083608. Arrived on K&ESR in January 1988. Number 158 in the K&ESR stocklist.	
British Railways		Bogie Bolster	Arrived on the K&ESR in the early 1990s. Number 163 in the K&ESR stocklist.	
British Railways	B900427	40-ton bogie Weltol	Built in 1957 by Head Wrightson as part of Lot 3069 to Diagram 2/524. Arrived on the K&ESR in 1995. Number 164 in the K&ESR stocklist.	
British Railways	DS62862	20-ton ballast plough brake van	Built in 1949 to a South Eastern and Chatham Railway design dating from 1919. Number 165 in the K&ESR stocklist.	
British Railways	DB994441	40-ton bogie flat wagon	Built in 1959 at Lancing as part of Lot 3265 to Diagram 1/647. Arrived on the K&ESR in the late 1990s. Number 166 in the K&ESR stocklist.	
British Railways	DB994457	40-ton bogie flat wagon	Built in 1959 at Lancing as part of Lot 3265 to Diagram 1/647. Arrived on the K&ESR in the late 1990s. Number 167 in the K&ESR stocklist.	
British Railways	KDB733964	14-ton Conflat	Built in 1954 at Ashford Works as part of Lot 2764 to Diagram 066 and later converted to carry cable drums. Arrived on the K&ESR in autumn 1997. Number 168 in the K&ESR stocklist.	
British Railways		20-ton tube wagon	Built by Faverdale Carriage & Wagon Company to a London and North Eastern Railway design as part of Lot 2049 to Diagram 1/445. Arrived on the K&ESR in January 1998. Number 169 in the K&ESR stocklist.	
British Railways	932502	20-ton plate wagon	Built in 1954 at Shildon as part of Lot 2604 to Diagram 1/431. Arrived on the K&ESR in autumn 1997. Number 170 in the K&ESR stocklist.	
British Railways	741895	14-ton pipe wagon	Built in 1961 at Wolverton as part of Lot 3335 to Diagram 1/462. Arrived on the K&ESR in January 1998. Number 171 in the K&ESR stocklist.	
British Railways	989104	14-ton side tipping wagon	Built by Metropolitan Cammell Carriage and Wagon in 1959 as part of Lot 3170 to Diagram 1/575. Arrived on the K&ESR in April 1998. Number 172 in the K&ESR stocklist.	
British Railways	989284	14-ton side tipping wagon	Built by Metropolitan Cammell Carriage and Wagon in 1959 as part of Lot 3170 to Diagram 1/575. Arrived on the K&ESR in April 1998. Number 173 in the K&ESR stocklist.	
British Railways	905096	Lowmac	Built in 1957 at Swindon Works to Diagram 2/241. Arrived on the K&ESR in 2004. Number 176 in the K&ESR stocklist.	
Southern Railway	61103	Well wagon	Designed by Bulleid and built at Lancing in 1944. Arrived on the K&ESR in 2004. Number 177 in the K&ESR stocklist.	
Southern Railway	55490	"Dance Hall" brake van	Built 1923 Ashford Works. Ordered by SECR as No. 11934. Carried SR number 55490 (BR S 55490). Became departmental DS 55490 in November 1959. Preserved initially at Blunsden in 1984 and moved by its owners to Swindon in 1987 and the Bluebell Railway in 1994. They again transferred it, to the K&ESR, in January 2022.	SECR "Dance Hall" goods brake van No. 55490 at the Bluebell Railway - 13 November 2004 (Richard Salmon)
Southern Railway	55xxx	Dancehall brake van	Built in 1927 at Lancing to Diagram 1560. This brake van is originally an SECR design. All that currently remains are the metal body frames, stored at Northiam behind LCDR 49. Number 159 in the K&ESR stocklist.	

=== Permanent way equipment ===
Origin	Number	Type	Notes	Photograph
Thomas Smith & Sons (Rodley) Ltd		5-ton self-propelled diesel crane	Built as a steam crane, works number 12019/1935. Later rebuilt by her makers as a diesel crane. Purchased from Sir Robert McAlpine & Sons Ltd in 1971. Number 109 in the K&ESR stocklist. ^{A}	
Taylor & Hubbard	DS451	10-ton Steam Crane	Built by Taylor & Hubbard as works number 1603/1949. Used at New Cross Gate then Hither Green before being transferred to Ashford Works as a spare. Withdrawn in 1981 and sold by tender to the K&ESR in August 1982. Number 133 in the K&ESR stocklist.^{A}	
London and South Western Railway	4668	Match truck	Built by the London and South Western Railway as a 58 feet (17.68 m) composite carriage number 4668 and rebuilt by the Southern Railway in 1935. Converted in 1958 to a match truck and renumbered DS70003. Used with steam crane DS451. Number 134 in the K&ESR stocklist.^{A}	
Grafton Cranes Ltd	DS1770	10-ton steam crane	Built by Grafton Cranes Ltd, Bedford as works number 2690/1945. Spent her entire career based at Ashford Works. Numbered 1770/10 by the Southern Railway and DS1770 by British Railways. In 1978 it was designated an internal user vehicle and renumbered 083316. Withdrawn on the closure of Ashford Works in 1983. Arrived on the K&ESR 3 February 1984. Number 145 in the K&ESR stocklist.^{A}	
Ransomes & Rapier	81S	30-ton steam crane	Built by Ransomes and Rapier, Ipswich in 1926 for the Southern Railway. Renumbered DS81 by British Railways and later ADRR95201. Arrived on the K&ESR in 1987. Number 151 in the K&ESR stocklist.	
Gloucester Railway Carriage & Wagon Co Ltd		Bogie match wagon	Built by Gloucester Railway Carriage & Wagon Co Ltd in 1927 as a match wagon for crane 81S. Latterly numbered AD3088 by British Rail. Arrived on the K&ESR in 1987. Number 152 in the K&ESR stocklist.	
Metropolitan Carriage, Wagon and Finance Company	DS3141	Match wagon	Built for the South Eastern and Chatham Railway in 1900 as a composite carriage. Converted to a match wagon in 1948 and numbered D3141. Arrived on the K&ESR on 16 August 1990 for use with crane 145 following the conversion of match truck 146 to a flat wagon. Number 162 in the K&ESR stocklist.	
British Railways	35079	Staff and tools van	Built as Mark 1 carriage E35079. Converted in 1972 to a staff and tools van for use by breakdown train crews and renumbered ADB975472. Arrived on the K&ESR in 1998. Number 174 in the K&ESR stocklist.	
		Track Maintenance Machine	Purchased from Balfour Beatty	
Plasser & Theurer			Class 07 Ballast tamper	

== Former stock ==
Rolling stock which has previously operated on the Kent & East Sussex Railway.

=== Former Steam locomotives ===
Origin	Wheel arrangement	Class	Notes	Photograph
London, Brighton and South Coast Railway (LBSC)	0-6-0T	A1X (Terrier)	Number 10 Sutton. Built as LBSC No. 50 Whitechapel. Rebuilt to A1X in May 1920. To the Isle of Wight in May 1930 and renumbered W9 Fishbourne. Returned to the mainland in 1936 and stored. Entered Departmental Service in 1937 as 515S and used at Lancing Carriage Works. Returned to Service Stock in 1953 and renumber 32650. Worked the Hayling Island Branch Line until closure. Withdrawn in November 1964 and stored. Purchased in 1964 by London Borough of Sutton and an offer by the K&ESR to restore her was accepted with the condition that it was to carry the name Sutton. Arrived by rail at Robertsbridge on 19 September 1964. Along with No 17 Arthur it hauled the first public passenger trains when the line was officially reopened in June 1974, the first train to Newmill Bridge in 1976 and the first train to Wittersham Road in 1978. Withdrawn on 1 January 1980 for firebox and boiler repairs. Re-entered service in 1984.^{A} Status: Undergoing overhaul at the Spa Valley Railway	
Manning Wardle	0-6-0ST		Number 15 Rhyl. Works number 2009/1921. Built for Stewarts & Lloyds Ltd (S&L), Corby. Carried number 41 in the S&L fleet. Withdrawn in 1968 and arrived at Rolvenden in 1972.^{A} Status: Awaiting restoration at Nottingham Transport Heritage Centre.	
Manning Wardle	0-6-0ST		Number 16 Dolobran. Works number 1762/1910. Built for Stewarts & Lloyds Ltd (S&L), Corby. Carried number 38 in the S&L fleet. Withdrawn in 1968 and arrived at Rolvenden in 1972.^{A} Status: Under restoration at Nottingham Transport Heritage Centre.	
Manning Wardle	0-6-0ST	L Class	Number 17 Arthur. Works number 1601/1903. Built for P W Anderson & Company. Used in the construction of Kent Portland Cement Works, Stone. Sold to Associated Portland Cement Manufacturers Ltd., Stone and worked there until withdrawn in 1967 and loaned to the K&ESR. Used on the first public steam trains in February 1974 along with No. 10 Sutton. Status: On museum display and 'out of ticket' at the Middleton Railway, now named Matthew Murray.	
Peckett	0-6-0ST		Number 18 Westminster. Works number 1378/1914. Built for Sir J Jackson Ltd. Used in the construction of military camps on Salisbury Plain. Sold to the War Department in 1917. Worked on the Fovant Military Railway until the line closed in 1921. Sold to Dunstable Portland Cement Co Ltd, Dunstable and was transferred by their successors, Associated Portland Cement Manufacturers Ltd. (APCM) in 1952 to work in a quarry at Shipton-on-Cherwell where it was numbered 5 in the APCM fleet. Withdrawn in August 1969 and arrived on the K&ESR in 1970. Placed on static display at Bodiam in 1975.^{A} Status: Under restoration at the Northampton & Lamport Railway.	
Hunslet	0-6-0ST	Austerity	Number 24 Rolvenden. One of a batch of fourteen 'Bucket Class Locomotives' built in 1952-53 as war reserve stock. Works number 3800/1953. Originally WD 200, later WD 95. Served at Bicester Military Railway and then at Shoeburyness. Arrived on K&ESR in January 1971.^{A} Status: In store awaiting 10 yearly overhaul on the Colne Valley Railway.	
Hunslet	0-6-0ST	Austerity	Number 26 Linda. Works number 3781/1952 'Bucket Class'. Built for the National Coal Board. Withdrawn in 1977 from NCB Maesteg.^{A} Status: Operational on the Mid-Hants Railway. Externally converted to Thomas The Tank Engine in 1994. It has visited the K&ESR as Thomas the Tank Engine a number of times during Thomas Weekends.	
Robert Stephenson and Hawthorns	0-6-0ST	Austerity	Number 27 Rolvenden. 'Bucket Class'. Works number 7086/1943. Built for the War Department as WD75050. Worked at Antwerp Docks. Sold to the National Coal Board and worked in the Doncaster area. Arrived at Rolvenden in September 1979.^{A} Sold in 1995 and transferred to the Midland Railway Centre (now Midland Railway – Butterley), Swanwick, Derbyshire. Status: Now running on Embsay and Bolton Abbey Steam Railway. Sometimes carries name "Norman".	
Robert Stephenson and Hawthorns	0-6-0ST	56 Class	Number 26, 29 and 56. Works number 7667/1943. Built for Stewarts & Lloyds Ltd (S&L), Corby. The first of a class of ten locomotives. Carried No. 56 on the S&L system. Withdrawn in January 1969 and arrived at Rolvenden in 1972. In service from 1976 to 1980. Carried number 56, then 26 and 29.^{A} Status: Under overhaul at the Nottingham Transport Heritage Centre.	
Sentinel	0-4-0VG		Gervase, built by Manning Wardle as "H" Class works number 1742/1900. Rebuilt by Sentinel as a vertical boilered geared locomotive as their works number 6807/1928. Arrived on the K&ESR in 1972.^{A} Sold in 2008. Status: Now operational at the Elsecar Steam Railway.	
Hunslet	0-6-0ST		Hastings, built by Hunslet as works number 469/1888. Arrived on the K&ESR in 1964 and sold in 1976.^{A} Status: Under restoration at Mangapps Railway Museum, Burnham-on-Crouch.	
Hawthorn Leslie	0-4-0ST		Met, built by Hawthorn Leslie as works number 2800/1909. Arrive on the K&ESR in 1967 and departed in 1979.^{A} Status:	
Fox Walker & Co Ltd	0-6-0ST		Minnie, built by Fox Walker as works number 358/1877. Arrived on the K&ESR in 1963 and sold in 1983 to Dover Industrial Museum, Dover.^{A} Status: Static display at Mangapps Railway Museum, Burnham-on-Crouch.	
Hunslet	0-6-0ST	Austerity	Errol Lonsdale, built by Hunslet as works number 3796/1953 'Bucket Class'. Worked on the Longmoor Military Railway. Arrived on the K&ESR in 1970 and departed in 1976.^{A} Status: Exported to Stoomcentrum Maldegem, Belgium in 2009. Overhaul now underway.	
Southern Railway	2-6-0	U	No. 1618, designed by Maunsell and built at Eastleigh Works in 1928. Arrived on the K&ESR in 1972 and departed in 1977.^{A} Status: Static display awaiting overhaul at the Bluebell Railway overhaul to take place once 928 Stowe is completed	last ran in 1994
Fletcher Jennings	0-4-0T		Baxter, built by Fletcher Jennings as works number 158/1877. Arrived on the K&ESR in August 1982 and departed in May 1983.^{A} Status: Static display awaiting overhaul at the Bluebell Railway last ran on 6 October 2018	

=== Former Diesel locomotives ===
Origin	Wheel arrangement	Class	Notes	Photograph
Robert Stephenson and Hawthorns	0-4-0DH		Built in 1962. Acquired from BP Chemicals Ltd, Baglan Bay in March 1977. Was Number 41 Baglan in the K&ESR stocklist. Used as a stand-by engine as it was too heavy for the track beyond Hexden Bridge.^{A} Scrapped, according to the 1987 KESR Stockbook.	
Hunslet	0-6-0DM		Works number 4208/1948. Built for John Sumner's Steelworks and later sold to Tunnel Cement, Pitstone. Was Number 42 Hunslet in the K&ESR stocklist. Arrived at Rolvenden in January 1978. Damaged an axle in the 1980s, and put into storage for many years.^{A} Left the railway, and was scrapped in 2001.	
Fowler	0-4-0DM		Works number 4220031/1864. Acquired from Shell in 1979. Was Number 43 Fowler in the K&ESR Stocklist. Used on works trains but declared surplus to requirements in 1984. Sold to the Windsor Railway group, but moved to the Swindon & Cricklade Railway.^{A}	
British Railways	0-6-0DM	04	Works number D212/1953. Built by Vulcan Foundry, Newton-le-Willows. British Railways number 11106 and D2205. Withdrawn in 1969 and sold in 1970 to Tees & Hartlepool Port Authority, Middlesbrough Docks, becoming their number 6. Sold to the K&ESR in 1983, arrived at Rolvenden in August 1983. Was Number 45 in the K&ESR stocklist.^{A} Moved to the West Somerset Railway in late 1989. Status: Out of service.	
British Railways No. D6570 (33052) Ashford	Bo-Bo	British Rail Class 33	Works number DEL174/1961. Built by Birmingham Railway Carriage and Wagon Company, Smethwick. Numbered D6570 by British Railways and later 33 052. Allocated to Hither Green for most of its career, then Stewarts Lane before withdrawal. Carries the name Ashford which was given to the locomotive in British Rail service. Purchased in 1997 from English, Welsh & Scottish Railways and restored to early green livery as D6570 Ashford. Sold to B350 Ltd, and moved to Bluebell Railway on 2 July 2021.	D6570 in Sheffield Park Carriage Shed after arrival at the Bluebell Railway, 8 August 2021 (Richard Salmon)

=== Former Railcars ===
Origin	Class	Notes	Photograph
AC Cars	Railbus	Built in 1958 as W79978 for Western Region. Used in Gloucestershire, Cornwall and Somerset before transfer to the Scottish Region. Withdrawn in 1967 and then purchased by the North Yorkshire Moors Railway. Arrived on the K&ESR in 1980, and numbered 44 in the K&ESR stocklist. Used on out of season services and shuttles between Bodiam and Dixter Halt. Sold to the Colne Valley Railway where it currently lies out of service.	

=== Former Passenger stock ===
Origin	Number	Type	Notes	Photograph
Southern Railway	7400	FK	Designed by Maunsell. Built in 1929 at Eastleigh Works to Diagram 2503. Built to Restriction '0'. Did not form part of a set initially, but was part of 3-carriage set 480 by the mid-1930s. Withdrawn in 1961 and entered Departmental service as a mobile classroom, renumbered 081621. Used by the Signalling & Telegraph Department, Eastleigh. Arrived on the K&ESR in 1971.^{A} Body scrapped in 1999. Was number 57 in the K&ESR stocklist. Underframe now carries South Eastern and Chatham Railway carriage No. 3448.	
Southern Railway	7798	SO	Designed by Maunsell. Built in 1931 at Eastleigh Works to Diagram 2653. Built to Restriction '1'. Originally an unclassified open, later classed as a Second Open. Withdrawn in October 1959 having been part of carriage set 434. Entered Departmental Service as DS70109, used as a mess and tool van at Purley from 1961 to 1971.^{A} Body scrapped sometime after May 1998. Was number 58 in the K&ESR stocklist.	
Southern Railway	1020	Corridor Third	Built in 1934 at Eastleigh Works to Diagram 2004. Withdrawn in 1959 and entered Departmental Service as a mess and tool van at Ashford. Renumbered DS70134. Purchased in 1971.^{A} Was number 59 in the K&ESR stocklist.	
British Railways	4037	Mark 1 TSO	Built at Swindon Works to Diagram 93. Withdrawn in 1977 and in service on the K&ESR until 1995, when it was moved to the Rother Valley Railway, Robertsbridge, after receiving fire damage at one end. Moved to the East Somerset Railway for refurbishment in 2011. 4037 later moved to the Bodmin and Wenford Railway in 2016, and in 2019 was restored to operational order in BR Crimson Lake and Cream livery. Was number 65 in the K&ESR stocklist.	
South Eastern and Chatham Railway	1084	Birdcage Brake Composite	This carriage was built at Ashford Works in April 1910. Built to Restriction '0' loading gauge which enabled it to be used on the Hastings Line. Later renumbered by the Southern Railway to 3363, at one time it formed part of set 128, and later set 901. Renumbered by British Railways to S3363S, withdrawn in 1954 and entered Departmental Service as DS22. Converted to a gauge measuring carriage and used to check clearances in bridge and tunnels on the Southern Region network. Withdrawn in 1977 and sold to the K&ESR. Length 50 feet 1 inch (15.27 m). Retains its original bogies and wood-centred wheels. Used as a mess coach. As built it seated 15 second class and 38 third class passengers. It was bought in 1999 by a member of the Bluebell Railway. After a major overhaul was completed, restoration to traffic on the Bluebell Railway took place in October 2011. Was numbered 68 in the K&ESR stock list. ^{A}	SECR Birdcage Brake No.3363 as restored on the Bluebell Railway
South Eastern and Chatham Railway	1106	Birdcage Composite Brake	This carriage was built as Ashford Works in December 1910. Built to Restriction '0' loading gauge which enabled it to be used on the Hastings Line. It formed part of a three carriage set of coaches numbered 113 by the Southern Railway. The centre coach was scrapped in the late 1950s due to accident damage. Sold to the Longmoor Military Railway in 1943 and remained in use until closure in 1970. Delivered by rail to Robertsbridge in September 1970. Length 54 feet 1 inch (16.48 m). As built it seated 8 second class and 60 third class passengers. Number 60 in the K&ESR stock list. ^{A} Moved on 20 October 2021 to Isle of Wight Steam Railway for eventual restoration as an 8 1/2 compartment conversion as per birdcage carriages transferred to the IoW by the SR/BR.	
Southern Railway	4438	Brake Unclassed Open	Designed by Maunsell. Built in 1933 at Eastleigh Works as an unclassified brake to Diagram 2654. Built to Restriction '1'. Converted in 1959 to an ambulance carriage and renumbered 7290. Placed in store at Stewarts Lane in 1966 and then entered Departmental Stock c1973 as DB975279. Used as a mess and tool van at Dover Marine for seven years. Sold for scrap but purchased by K&ESR, arriving in June 1980.^{A} Scrapped in the summer of 1988. Was number 72 in the K&ESR stocklist.	
Clayton Wagons Ltd	119 Cambria	Pullman FK	Built at Lincoln in 1920 for the Great Eastern Railway. Entered service in green and cream livery and used on boat trains between London and Harwich. Later used on the Harrogate Pullman. Rebuilt at Longhedge in 19284 as a first brake and repainted into umber and cream livery. Rebuilt in 1934 at Preston Park and withdrawn in 1934. To Departmental Services, renumbered DE 960820 and based at Beighton from 1960 where it was used as a mess and tool van. Arrived on the K&ESR in June 1980.^{A} Later moved to the Rother Valley Railway at Robertsbridge where the body was destroyed in June 2000 in an arson attack. The bogies were reported as being earmarked for use by the Royal Deeside Railway. Was number 71 Cambria in the K&ESR fleet.	
Southern Railway	1346	Third Open	Designed by Richard Maunsell. Built in 1933 at Eastleigh Works to Diagram 2005. Damaged in an air raid at Clapham Junction during World War II and later rebuilt. Built to Restriction '4'. Withdrawn in 1961 and entered Departmental Service^{A} as DS 70201 and later ADS 083181. Used as a classroom by the Carriage & Wagon Department at Clapham Junction. Purchased by the K&ESR and arrived in September 1982.^{A} Moved to the Rother Valley Railway by June 1999. Was number 72 in the K&ESR stocklist. Reported sold in February 2002 for restoration and eventual service on the Swanage Railway. 1346 travelled to Barrow Hill for repairs to the gangways in 2015. By 2019, 1346 is back at Swanage.	
Great Eastern Railway	63	Directors' Saloon	Built in March, 1912 to Diagram 29 in Lot R69. Re-numbered 21870 by LNER in 1927. Withdrawn at Newcastle in 1972, preserved in 1973. Arrived at the K&ESR in 1989 after being at Resco since 1980. Left for Harrogate in September, 1999 for restoration. It was loaned to Shildon for 18 months in November 2006. No. 63 was used in the production of "The Railway Children" in Toronto, Canada in 2011. In 2012, it went to the Pontypool and Blaenavon Railway on loan from Stately Trains and to remain there for the foreseeable future. Was number 96 in the K&ESR stocklist.	
South Eastern and Chatham Railway	3448	Composite	Built by Cravens to Diagram S2794/1. Withdrawn in 1941 and body grounded at Ashford Works. Purchased in 1964 and placed on the platform at Tenterden for use as a mess coach. In 1999, it was placed on the underframe of SR FK 7400. Body scrapped 2021. Number 101 in the K&ESR stocklist.	

=== Former Non-Passenger stock ===
Origin	Number	Type	Notes	Photograph
Southern Railway	440	4-wheel Guards Brake	Built in 1937 at Eastleigh Works to Diagram3092. Withdrawn in 1977 and arrived on the K&ESR in July of that year.^{A} To Rother Valley Railway by June 1999. Now undergoing restoration. Was number 66 in the K&ESR stocklist.	
Southern Railway	1145	Luggage Van	Built in 1936 at Ashford Works to Diagram 3103. Withdrawn in February 1966 and entered Departmental Service as DS70217. Used as a mess and tool van by the Civil Engineer's Department.^{A} Purchased by K&ESR in 1984. Body grounded at Bodiam by March 2007. Underframe to be used to carry the body of London, Chatham and Dover Railway carriage number 108. Was number 79 in the K&ESR stocklist.	
Southern Railway	1248	Luggage Van	Built in 1935 at Eastleigh Works to Diagram 3103. Withdrawn in July 1957 and entered Departmental Service as DS161. Used as a mess van and latterly as a store at Selhurst Depot. To K&ESR in February 1984. Intended that the body was to be grounded at Rolvenden and the underframe was to be used to carry the body of a London, Chatham and Dover Railway carriage.^{A} Was number 80 in the K&ESR stocklist. Moved to the Rother Valley Railway and sold to the Swanage Railway in 1999.	
Southern Railway	2339	Bogie Luggage Van	Built in 1930 at Ashford Works to Diagram 3098 on the lengthened underframe of London and South Western Railway Composite 3001. Used a part of Ambulance Train 36 from 1944 to 1947. Withdrawn in 1960 and entered Departmental Service as DS70076. Arrived on K&ESR in May 1982.^{A} Was number 77 in the K&ESR stocklist. Moved to the Rother Valley Railway in 1994. Sold in February 2002 and intended to be moved to the Swanage Railway. Still at Robertsbridge in September 2009.	

=== Former Freight Stock ===
Origin	Number	Type	Notes	Photograph
London and North Eastern Railway		Banana van	Acquired from Hodson's Mill, Robertsbridge in 1972. Number 106 in the K&ESR stocklist.^{A}	
Kent and East Sussex Railway		12-ton flat	Built in 1926 by the London, Midland and Scottish Railway at Newtonheath as a Banana Van. Acquired from Hodson's Mill, Robertsbridge in 1972. Body scrapped in 1976. Number 107 in the K&ESR stocklist.^{A}	
Woolwich Arsenal Railway		3-plank dropside open	Obtained from the Woolwich Arsenal Railway in 1964. Built at the turn of the 20th century. Number 110 in the K&ESR stocklist.^{A}	
Woolwich Arsenal Railway		3-plank dropside open	Obtained from the Woolwich Arsenal Railway in 1964. Built at the turn of the 20th century. Number 111 in the K&ESR stocklist.^{A}	
		8-ton flat	Acquired from Reed's Paper Mills, Aylesford in 1964. Number 114 in the K&ESR stocklist.^{A}	
Charles Roberts, Horbury Junction		15-ton flat	Built in 1918 as a tank wagon. Acquired from Anglo-American Asphalt, Tonbridge in 1976. Tank body removed before delivery to K&ESR. Number 115 in the K&ESR stocklist.^{A}	
S J Claye Ltd, Long Eaton		15-ton flat	Built in 1923 as a tank wagon. Acquired from Anglo-American Asphalt, Tonbridge in 1976. Tank body removed before delivery to K&ESR. Number 116 in the K&ESR stocklist.^{A}	
		Bogie side tipping wagon	Built during World War II in the United States. Later owned by Sir Robert McAlpine & Sons. Purchased by the K&ESR in August 1976. Number 117 in the K&ESR stocklist.^{A}	
London and North Eastern Railway	157787	20-ton brake van	Built in 1929 at Doncaster. Sold in 1963 to Tunnel Cement, Grays. Arrived on the K&ESR in June 1977. Now restored and operational on the Mid-Suffolk Light Railway. Number 119 in the K&ESR stocklist.^{A}	
Kent and East Sussex Railway	122	3-plank dropside open	Built by the K&ESR in 1978 on the underframe of 1958-built British Railways Vanfit B758315. Number 122 in the K&ESR stocklist.^{A}	
London and North Eastern Railway		25-ton ballast hopper wagon	Built in 1940 to Diagram 231. Numbered DE549931 by British Railways. Withdrawn in 1968 and sold to Tunnel Cement Ltd, Grays. Loaned to K&ESR in 1977 and purchased in September 1978. Number 123 in the K&ESR stocklist.^{A}	
Metropolitan-Cammell Carriage & Wagon Co Ltd		16-ton open	Built in 1946 by Metropolitan-Cammell Carriage & Wagon Co Ltd, and sent in kit form to SNCF who assembled it at Bordeaux. One of over 10,000 wagons supplied to SNCF to replace stock lost during the war. Purchased by British Railways in 1950 and sold in the 1960 to the National Coal Board who used it at Snowdown Colliery, Kent. Purchased by the K&ESR in October 1978. Number 124 on the K&ESR stocklist.^{A}	
London, Brighton and South Coast Railway	3713	10-ton ventilated van	Built in 1920 at Brighton Works. Renumbered 46773 by the Southern Railway and then entered Departmental Service as 1188S before returning to Capital Stock in 1939. Withdrawn in 1950 at Crabtree sidings, Belvedere where it was used as an oil store. To K&ESR in 1978. Number 125 in the K&ESR stocklist.^{A}	
		Flat	Possibly of LMS origin. Purchased from 14 Command Workshops, REME, Ashford in February 1984. Number 126 in the K&ESR stocklist.^{A}	
London and South Western Railway	1401	7-ton gunpowder van	Built in 1912 at Eastleigh Works. Renumbered 61206 by the Southern Railway. Transferred to Departmental Service in 1954 as a stores van, renumbered 080407. Condemned in 1956 and body grounded at Woking. To K&ESR in 1979 and was grounded at Tenterden, was said to be scrapped, number 127 in the K&ESR stocklist. ^{A}	
London and South Western Railway	2780	10-ton ventilated van	Built in 1906 at Eastleigh Works to Diagram 1410. Renumbered 42679 by the Southern Railway. Entered Departmental Service in 1946 and renumbered DS396. Used to carry supplies between Lancing Works and Slade Green Depot. British Railways number 081273. To Margate in 1960 as an internal user wagon. Withdrawn in 1980 and sold to K&ESR. Now at the Swanage Railway and restored. Number 129 in the K&ESR stocklist.^{A}	
Ruston & Hornsby		Compressor wagon	Built as a 48 horsepower (36 kW) 0-4-0D locomotive. Carried the name Star of India. Converted in 1980 to a mobile compressor unit. Withdrawn from K&ESR service in 1984 and used as a buffer stop at Bodiam for some time. Number 130 in the K&ESR stocklist.^{A}	
London and North Eastern Railway	161278	12-ton van	Built in the late 1920s, Sold to the Royal Navy and used at HM Dockyard Chatham. Numbered 556 by the Royal Navy. Number 131 in the K&ESR stocklist.^{A}	
Great Western Railway		Twin bolster wagon	Built by the Great Western Railway. Later sold to the Royal Navy and used at HM Dockyard Chatham. One of a pair of permanently coupled wagons. Numbered 614 by the Navy. Purchased by the K&ESR in 1984. Number 139 in the K&ESR stocklist.^{A}	
Great Western Railway		Twin bolster wagon	Built by the Great Western Railway. Later sold to the Royal Navy and used at HM Dockyard Chatham. One of a pair of permanently coupled wagons. Numbered 614 by the Navy. Purchased by the K&ESR in 1984. Number 140 in the K&ESR stocklist.^{A}	
Midland Railway Carriage and Wagon Company		10-ton tank wagon	Built in 1901 and registered with the Taff Vale Railway as number 10892. Later owned by BP and numbered 529. Used at Tunbridge Wells West Depot as a diesel storage tank before withdrawal in 1983. Number 141 in the K&ESR stocklist.^{A}	
		10-ton tank wagon	Built in 1898. Registered with the North Eastern Railway. Later owned by BP and numbered 160. Used at Tunbridge Wells West Depot as a diesel storage tank before withdrawal in 1983. Number 142 in the K&ESR stocklist.^{A}	
Southern Railway	37064	8-plank open	Built in 1936 at Ashford Works to Diagram 1398. Transferred to Departmental Service in 1942 and renumbered DS1756. Used to carry stores between Ashford Works, Brighton Works and Eastleigh Works. Arrived on K&ESR in spring 1984. Number 147 in the K&ESR stocklist.^{A}	

== Notes ==
- Restriction '0' stock is 8 ft 0 3/4 in (2.46 m) wide and permitted to travel over the Hastings Line.
- Restriction '1' stock is 8 ft 6 in (2.59 m) wide and could travel over most of the former SECR lines, except the Hastings Line.
- Restriction '4' stock is 9 ft (2.74 m) wide.

== Sources ==
^Note A: Rose, Neil (1984). Kent & East Sussex Railway Stockbook. Tenterden: Colonel Stephens Publications.
