= Salehurst Halt railway station =

Former railway station in England

Coordinates: 50.989379°N 0.491873°E

Salehurst Halt

General information
- Location: Salehurst, Rother; England
- Grid reference: TQ749240
- Platforms: 1

Other information
- Status: Disused

History
- Post-grouping: Kent and East Sussex Railway; Southern Region of British Railways

Key dates
- c. 1903: Opened by private arrangement
- 23 September 1929: Opened to public
- 4 January 1954: Closed
Location

Salehurst Halt was a halt station on the Kent and East Sussex Railway which served the village of Salehurst in East Sussex, England. The station was reached by a footpath leading south from the village church in Salehurst. Closed in 1954, Salehurst Halt may yet see trains again as the Rother Valley Railway, a preservation society, is undertaking reopening the line from Robertsbridge to Bodiam, including the line through the halt.

== History ==
Although only officially opened to the public in 1929, a simple platform had existed at Salehurst Halt since at least 1903. It had been provided by the Rother Valley Railway following a request in December 1902 by the vicar of Salehurst, the Reverend Edward Sing, for trains to stop in bad weather on Wednesdays and Sundays so that his organist, Miss Elsam, could arrive at the church in time for services. The organist lived close to Bodiam station and usually reached the church by car, although her journey became difficult during bad weather when the roads were slippery. The vicar contended that as a platform had been provided at Junction Road where trains could be flagged down, a similar facility should be provided at Salehurst which had a higher population. The site of the proposed stopping place was situated to the north of the Rother and was the location of Salehurst Siding which provided goods facilities only. This short siding had been provided for the benefit of the Bantony Estate.

A simple earth and gravel platform held in by a wooden retaining face was duly provided and Colonel Stephens informed the Board of Trade of its existence in July 1903. In October 1913, the Salehurst Parish Council contacted Colonel Stephens about the possibility of establishing a public halt near the church. Although Stephens might have been favourable to the suggestion, nothing happened until 1929. In August 1929, the unexpected announcement was made that construction of a request stop at Salehurst had begun. Rather like Junction Road Halt, the station was no more than a single platform with a wooden bench and nameboard. The station, which began to appear in public timetables from 1929, seems to have been little used, even though it was one of the few stations on the line which was located close to the village it claimed to serve. It was also the only intermediate station not to be situated by a road crossing; it was reached by a footpath leading south from the church. The nearby small village of Salehurst consisted at the time of little more than a church, a public house and a cluster of houses, while Robertsbridge could be reached on foot in less than half an hour which was probably quicker than the usual late-running trains.

Following nationalisation and the creation of British Railways, Salehurst Halt was considered for closure on the basis that it was "never used" according to W. H. Austen, Colonel Stephens' successor. The halt remained nevertheless open, much in its original state of construction, until the last passenger service ran on Saturday 2 January 1954 Soon after public closure, the platform was removed by British Railways. The final passenger train to traverse the section of the line through Salehurst was a Locomotive Club of Great Britain special hauled by LB&SCR A1 class Nos. 32662 and 32670 on 11 June 1961.

Preceding station	Disused railways	Following station
Junction Road Halt	British Railways; Southern Region; KESR	Robertsbridge

== Present day ==
Nothing remains of the platform, although the station site is still reachable by footpath from Salehurst church. The public house still exists and is now known as "Salehurst Halt".

The Rother Valley Railway, a preservation group set up in 1991, is undertaking reopening the line between Robertsbridge and Bodiam. By June 2009, around 850 yards (780 m) of trackbed had been purchased from Robertsbridge to Northbridge Street, to the west of Salehurst, and the first train ran on that rebuilt section in September 2013.

== Sources ==
- Butt, R. V. J. (October 1995). The Directory of Railway Stations: details every public and private passenger station, halt, platform and stopping place, past and present (1st ed.). Sparkford: Patrick Stephens Ltd. ISBN 978-1-85260-508-7. OCLC 60251199. OL 11956311M.
- Clinker, C.R. (October 1978). Clinker's Register of Closed Passenger Stations and Goods Depots in England, Scotland and Wales 1830-1977. Bristol: Avon-Anglia Publications & Services. ISBN 0-905466-19-5.
- Course, Edwin (1976). The Railways of Southern England: Independent and Light Railways. London: B.T. Batsford Ltd. ISBN 0-7134-0490-6.
- Garrett, Stephen (1999) [1972]. The Kent & East Sussex Railway. Usk, Mon.: The Oakwood Press. ISBN 978-0-85361-516-3.
- Gough, Terry (2004) [1998]. The Kent & East Sussex Railway. Kettering, Northants: Past & Present Publishing. ISBN 978-1-85895-149-2.
- Hart, Brian (November 2009). The Kent & East Sussex Railway. Didcot, Oxon: Wild Swan Publications Ltd. ISBN 978-1-905184-57-6.
- Mitchell, Vic; Smith, Keith (June 1997) [1985]. Branch Line to Tenterden. Midhurst, West Sussex: Middleton Press. ISBN 978-0-906520-21-5.
- Oppitz, Leslie (2003). Lost Railways of Kent. Newbury, Berks: Countryside Books. ISBN 978-1-85306-803-4.
- Pallant, N. (1993). Holding the Line: Preserving the Kent and East Sussex Railway. Stroud, Gloucs: Alan Sutton Publishing. ISBN 978-0-750905480.
- Scott-Morgan, John (2007). An Illustrated History of the Kent and East Sussex Railway. Hersham, Surrey: OPC Railprint. ISBN 978-0-86093-608-4.
- White, H.P. (1987) [1976]. Forgotten Railways: South-East England (Forgotten Railways Series). Newton Abbot, Devon: David & Charles. ISBN 978-0-946537-37-2.
