= Northiam railway station =

Railway station in England

Northiam
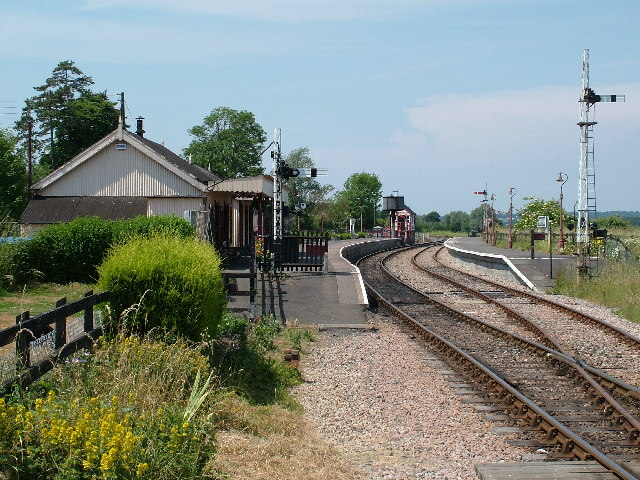

General information
- Location: Northiam, Rother, East Sussex; England
- Coordinates: 51.009475°N 0.614716°E
- Grid reference: TQ835265
- System: Station on heritage railway
- Platforms: 2

History
- Original company: Rother Valley Railway
- Pre-grouping: Kent and East Sussex Railway
- Post-grouping: Southern Region of British Railways

Key dates
- 2 April 1900: Opened
- 4 January 1954: Closed to passengers
- 12 June 1961: Goods services withdrawn
- 19 May 1990: Services resumed
- 4 June 1990: Officially reopened
Location

Northiam railway station is on the Kent and East Sussex Railway. It is located to the west of the level crossing on the A28 road linking the Kentish village of Newenden and the East Sussex village of Northiam. Having served the area for over sixty years, the station closed with the line in 1961, but was later reopened in 1990 by the Kent and East Sussex Railway heritage organisation.

== History ==
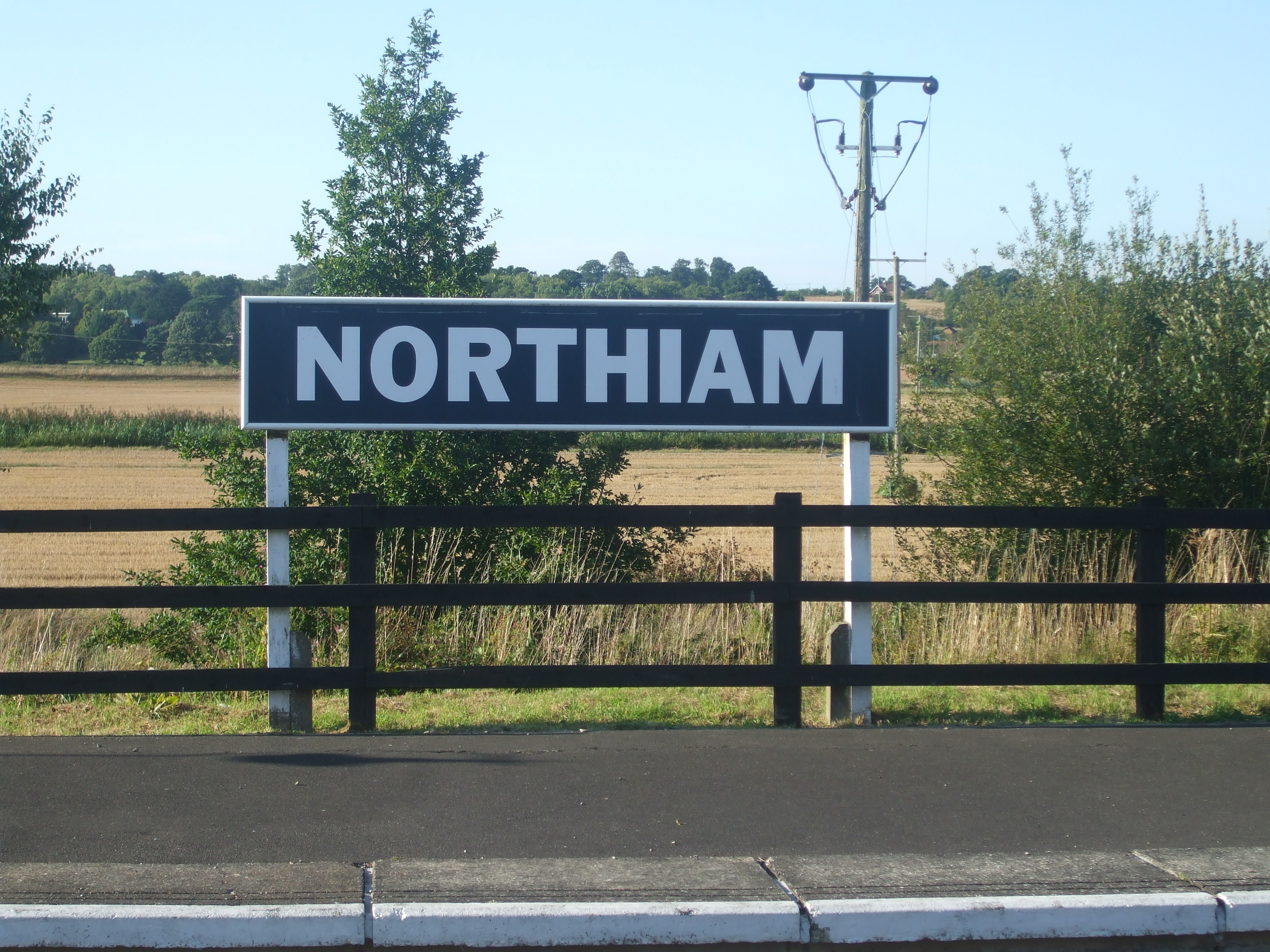
Running in board

Northiam was one of the original stations on the 12-mile (19 km) line opened by the Rother Valley Railway between Rolvenden and Robertsbridge in 1900. All the original three stations were slightly remote from the villages which they were purporting to serve; Northiam, which was in fact closer to Newenden, lay 1.75 miles (2.82 km) to the north of Northiam village. As with all K&ESR stations except Tenterden Town, Northiam had a simple wooden-frame, corrugated iron clad station building.

A long curving passing loop ran between two platform faces; Northiam was the only station south of Tenterden to be afforded such facilities, possibly on account of its location half-way between Robertsbridge and Tenterden. Two sidings led into a small goods yard and cattle dock to the south of the station. This saw use when, during the early part of the 20th century, Howse & Co. held fortnightly livestock sales in a nearby field. Two simple wooden bungalows were later erected in Northiam's goods yard as staff accommodation. By the 1950s, the second platform had fallen into disuse and British Railways had installed catch points to the goods yard sidings to prevent wagons rolling on to the main line. Regular passenger services on the line last ran on Saturday 2 January 1954, the line between Tenterden and Robertsbridge remaining open for goods traffic until 12 June 1961.

== Present day ==
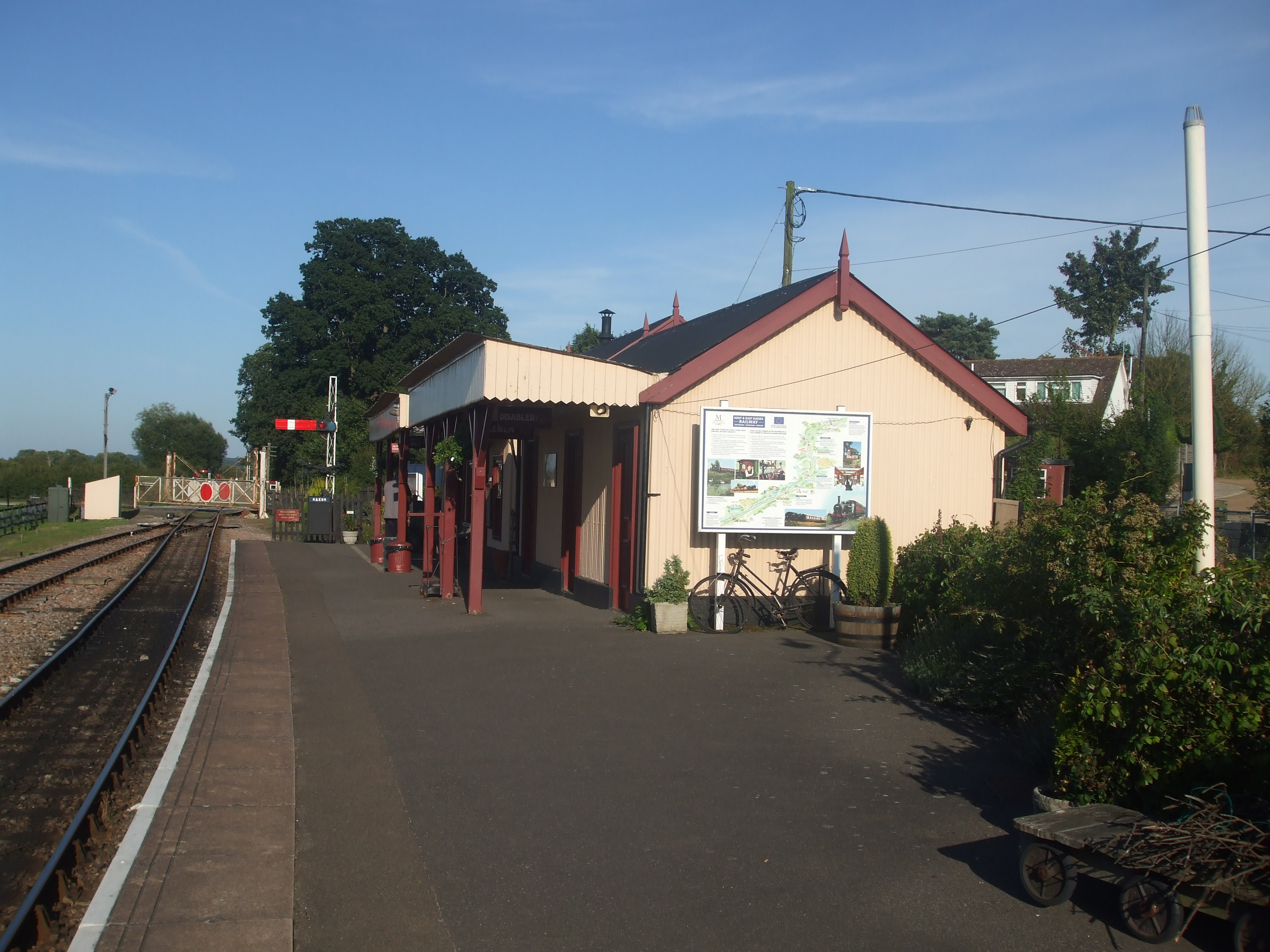
Station looking east.

Passenger services returned to Northiam on 19 May 1990 when the Kent and East Sussex Railway Preservation Society extended its operating line to the station. The project had required extensive repairs to the bridge over the River Rother on the Kent/East Sussex county boundary which, at 66 feet (20 m), is the longest bridge on the line. The extension project featured in a 1989 episode of Challenge Anneka, the challenge being to restore within 48 hours the extant station building and lay sufficient track to allow a train to enter. The deadline was met and at 6.15pm on Sunday 23 July 1989, SECR P class locomotive no. 1556 was the first locomotive to return to Northiam station. The episode was broadcast on 20 October 1989. The extension was officially inspected on 14 May 1990 after completion of the track layout, installation of a water crane, surfacing of the platforms, rebuilding of the level crossing and erection of a new toilet block. The first services ran on 19 May 1990, and on 4 June 1990 the station was officially reopened by the Duke of Gloucester. The Northiam extension led to a record number of passengers using the line—81,934—the highest since 1913. Initially only the Up platform was brought into use, it having been decided to reinstate the unrestored Down platform once the extension to Bodiam had been completed.

== Services ==
Preceding station	Heritage railways	Following station
Wittersham Road	Kent and East Sussex Railway	Bodiam
	Historical railways	
Wittersham Road	Kent and East Sussex Railway	Dixter Halt
Wittersham Road	British Railways; Southern Region; Kent and East Sussex Railway	Bodiam
