= Junction Road Halt railway station =

Railway station in Bodiam, Rother, England

Coordinates: 50.991011°N 0.523085°E

Junction Road Halt
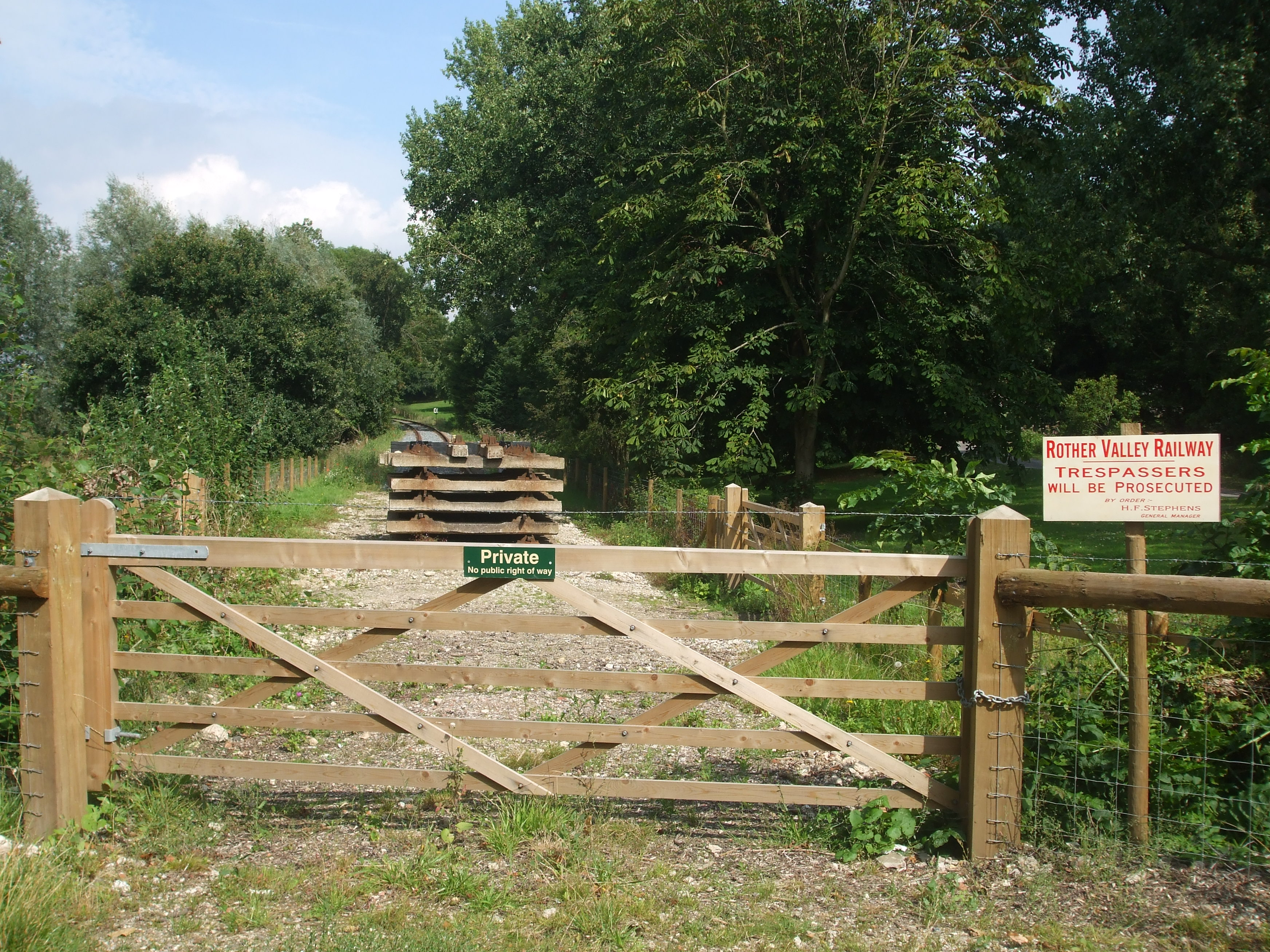
- Site of halt in August 2011 showing progress made by the Rother Valley Railway.

General information
- Location: Udiam nr Bodiam, Rother; England
- Grid reference: TQ771243
- Platforms: 1

Other information
- Status: Disused

History
- Original company: Rother Valley Railway
- Pre-grouping: Kent and East Sussex Railway
- Post-grouping: Southern Region of British Railways

Key dates
- 2 April 1900: Opened as Junction Road
- May 1901: Closed
- June 1903: Reopened
- January 1954: Closed to regular services
- 12 June 1961: Closed to all traffic
Location

Junction Road Halt, also known as Junction Road (for Hawkhurst), was a halt station on the Kent and East Sussex Railway. It was located on the eastern side of the level crossing across the B2244 Junction Road near the hamlet of Udiam in East Sussex, England. Closed for passengers in 1954 and freight in 1961 with the line, The line through Junction Road Halt may yet be revived as the Rother Valley Railway, a preservation society, is proposing to reopen the line from Robertsbridge to Bodiam.

== History ==
The Rother Valley Railway opened a small platform at Junction Road in 1900 as an informal private stopping place for the benefit of the tenant of the adjoining fields who enjoyed shooting rights over the land. The station was situated on the eastern side of a level crossing adjacent to Udiam Farm on the turnpike road from Hawkhurst to Hastings called Junction Road (now part of the B2244 road). The crossing was originally gated but cattle grids were later provided. The existence of the platform was discovered by the Board of Trade in January 1903 during an inspection of the line by Major Pringle who had stopped at the site to examine the new cattle grids. After the inspection, Colonel Stephens, the proprietor of the Rother Valley Railway, wrote to the Board of Trade to obtain permission to open the halt to the public. The station would be unstaffed and trains would only call as required. The Board of Trade indicated its willingness to authorise the halt so long as the railway provided suitable lights for trains calling in the hours of darkness. Despite Stephens' reply that guards would be instructed to aid passengers with a hand lamp, the Board of Trade still insisted on lights.

Although it is unclear whether formal authorisation was actually granted, the station began to appear in the railway company's timetables in June 1903. The name Udiam Halt was first used but this was soon abandoned in favour of Junction Road (for Hawkhurst), even though the village of Hawkhurst was some 4 miles (6.4 kilometres) away and had been served by its own railway station for the last eleven years. A lack of funds meant that no station buildings were provided at Junction Road, the station consisting merely of a single unsheltered platform constructed of wood and earth. In 1909, a siding was commissioned on the western side of the B2244 on the Up side of the line facing Robertsbridge and this was controlled by a two-levered ground frame situated nearby. The position of the siding meant that trains wishing to shunt here had to be tow-roped.

Junction Road, which was convenient for the Guinness hop farm, saw substantial passenger traffic during the hop-picking season, and this may have contributed towards the decision to renew the platform in 1948. The KESR had acquired the materials prior to nationalisation, and the work was completed by British Railways. The concrete parts had been made at the Exmouth Junction concrete works near Exeter and supplied by the Southern Railway. The platform was sufficiently long to accommodate a two-carriage train. The proximity of hop-farms was most likely the main reason for the station's survival.

Regular passenger services ceased in January 1954 but it continued to be used for special services, particularly hop-pickers' specials as late as September 1957. The last publicly advertised service to pass through the station was a seven-carriage Locomotive Club of Great Britain special, worked by LB&SCR A1 class Nos. 32662 and 32670, which ran on 11 June 1961. After closure a preservation group was formed to reopen the line. After many years of negotiations the Ministry of Transport however refused permission for the section of line west of Bodiam, on the basis of difficulties that the reopened level crossings at Junction Road and on the A21 road would pose to road traffic, as well as the possibility that the roads might need to be converted into dual carriageways, in which case the taxpayer would have to bear the expense of bridging the line. The track was removed between Bodiam and Robertsbridge in the early 1970s however the section between Bodiam and Tenterden has been reopened. The platform was still in situ in 1987 but was removed a few years later. No trace of the station remained by 1996.

Preceding station	Disused railways	Following station
Bodiam	British Railways; Southern Region; KESR	Salehurst Halt

== Present day ==
The Rother Valley Railway, a preservation group set up in 1991, had by March 2009 laid track from Bodiam to within 200 yards (180 m) of the site of Junction Road Halt at a cost of £200,000. A new owner of Udiam Farm, whose land incorporates the original railway alignment, agreed for the line to be reinstated through his garden along its historic route. The previous owner of Udiam Farm had not been willing for the line to cross his land. Track was relaid through the site of the halt in June 2010. On 18 March 2011, a VIP dining special was the first passenger train to traverse the rebuilt line. The following weekend of 19/20 March saw KESR services run as far as Junction Road; services were hauled by Manning Wardle 0-6-0ST No. 14, LB&SCR A1 class No.3, GWR 0-6-0PT No. 1638 and Hunslet Austerity 0-6-0ST No. 23, although passengers were not able to alight or board here. There are no plans to reinstate Junction Road Halt and Rother Valley Railway continues its efforts to reinstate the line westwards towards Robertsbridge.

== Sources ==
- Butt, R. V. J. (October 1995). The Directory of Railway Stations: details every public and private passenger station, halt, platform and stopping place, past and present (1st ed.). Sparkford: Patrick Stephens Ltd. ISBN 978-1-85260-508-7. OCLC 60251199. OL 11956311M.
- Clinker, C.R. (October 1978). Clinker's Register of Closed Passenger Stations and Goods Depots in England, Scotland and Wales 1830-1977. Bristol: Avon-Anglia Publications & Services. ISBN 0-905466-19-5.
- Course, Edwin (1976). The Railways of Southern England: Independent and Light Railways. London: B.T. Batsford Ltd. ISBN 0-7134-0490-6.
- Courtney, Geoff (5 August – 1 September 2010). "Steam trains back at Victorian halt after 56 years". Heritage Railway (140).
- Croughton, Godfrey; Kidner, R.W.; Young, Alan (1982). Private and Untimetabled Railway Stations. Salisbury: Oakwood Press. ISBN 0-85361-281-1.
- Garrett, Stephen (1999) [1972]. The Kent & East Sussex Railway. Usk, Mon.: The Oakwood Press. ISBN 978-0-85361-516-3.
- Gough, Terry (2004) [1998]. The Kent & East Sussex Railway. Kettering, Northants: Past & Present Publishing. ISBN 978-1-85895-149-2.
- Hart, Brian (November 2009). The Kent & East Sussex Railway. Didcot, Oxon: Wild Swan Publications Ltd. ISBN 978-1-905184-57-6.
- Mitchell, Vic; Smith, Keith (June 1997) [1985]. Branch Line to Tenterden. Midhurst, West Sussex: Middleton Press. ISBN 978-0-906520-21-5.
- Oppitz, Leslie (2003). Lost Railways of Kent. Newbury, Berks: Countryside Books. ISBN 978-1-85306-803-4.
- Pallant, N. (1993). Holding the Line: Preserving the Kent and East Sussex Railway. Stroud, Gloucs: Alan Sutton Publishing. ISBN 978-0-750905480.
- Piggott, Nick, ed. (May 2011). "Rother Valley Railway christens its new line". The Railway Magazine. 157 (1321).
- Scott-Morgan, John (2007). An Illustrated History of the Kent and East Sussex Railway. Hersham, Surrey: OPC Railprint. ISBN 978-0-86093-608-4.
- White, H.P. (1987) [1976]. Forgotten Railways: South-East England (Forgotten Railways Series). Newton Abbot, Devon: David & Charles. ISBN 978-0-946537-37-2.
