= Robert Pickering =

Robert Pickering may refer to:

- Robert Hugh Pickering (1932–2015), Canadian farmer, curler and political figure in Saskatchewan
- Robert Young Pickering (1849–1931), British industrialist
