= Wittersham Road railway station =

Former railway station in England

Wittersham Road
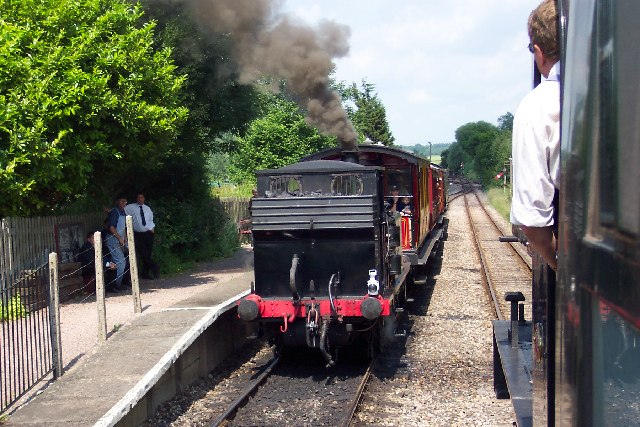

General information
- Location: Rolvenden Layne, Ashford, Kent; England
- Coordinates: 51.027249°N 0.660072°E
- Grid reference: TQ866286
- System: Station on heritage railway
- Platforms: 1

History
- Original company: Rother Valley Railway
- Pre-grouping: Kent and East Sussex Railway
- Post-grouping: Southern Region of British Railways

Key dates
- 2 April 1900: Opened
- 4 January 1954: Closed to passengers
- 12 June 1961: Goods services withdrawn
- 4 June 1977: Services resumed
- 16 June 1978: Officially reopened
Location

Wittersham Road is a railway station on the Kent and East Sussex Railway. It is located to the north-east of the level crossing on Maytham Road which links the Kentish villages of Rolvenden and Wittersham. Having served the area for over sixty years, the station closed for regular passengers in 1954 and completely in 1961. It was later rebuilt and reopened in 1977 by the Kent and East Sussex Railway heritage organisation.

== History ==
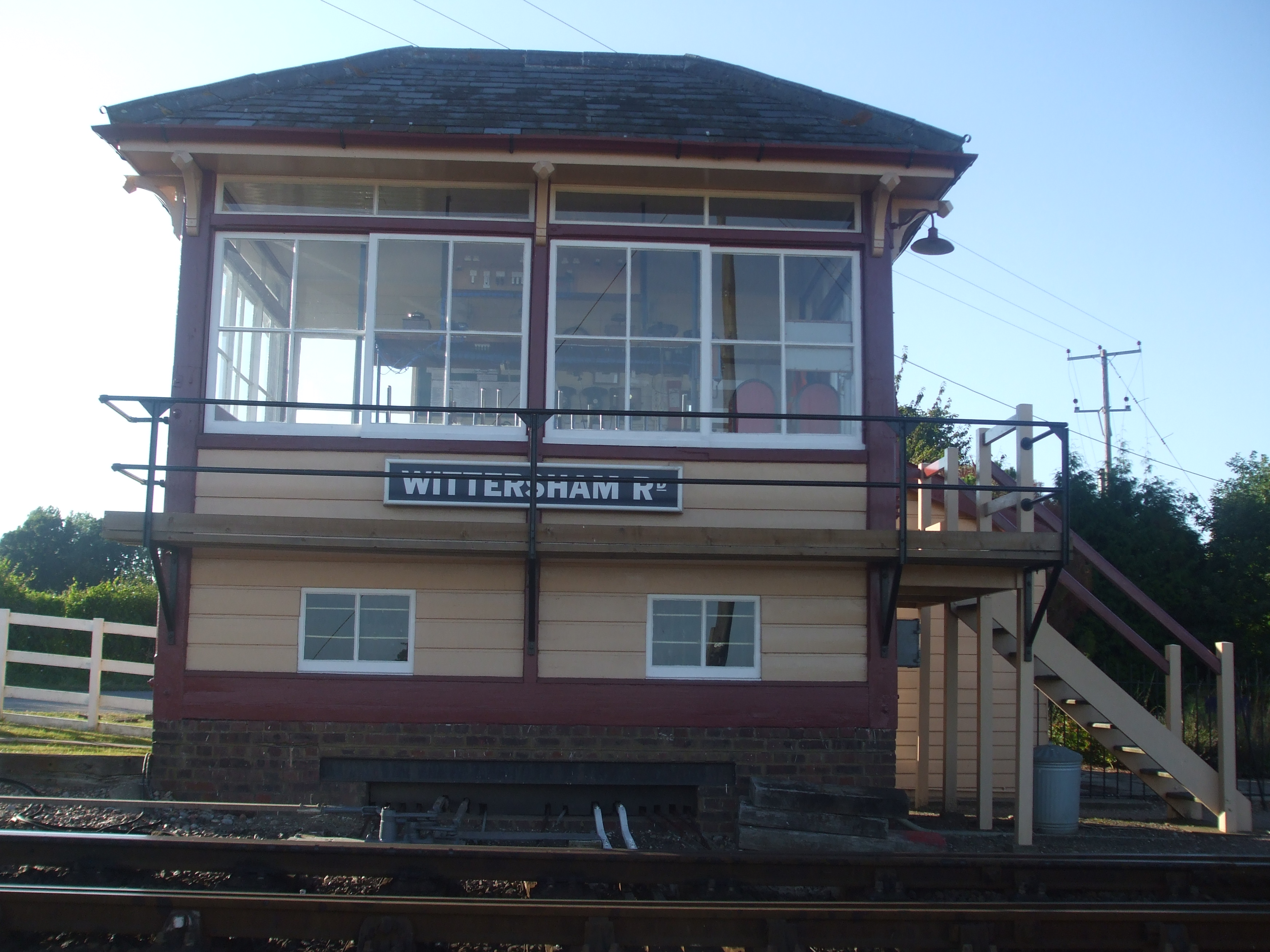
Wittersham Road signal box.

Wittersham Road was one of the original stations on the 12 miles (19 km) line opened by the Rother Valley Railway between Rolvenden and Robertsbridge in 1900. The remote location of the station meant that there was no particular settlement for it to serve, the village of Wittersham being some 2.75 miles (4.43 km) away, a distance reflected in the decision to name the station "Wittersham Road". The station consisted of a single platform and two sidings on the Down side facing Tenterden.

As with the station buildings at Bodiam and Northiam, a corrugated iron structure was provided at Wittersham Road, but this time lacking a platform awning. Unlike however all the Rother Valley stations, the station building at Wittersham Road was built at a right-angle to the platform. According to a 1948 timetable, the station was a compulsory stop for all trains from at least 1929 and possibly even earlier.

Between February 1941 and August 1944, a rail-mounted howitzer named SM Cleeve, belonging to the No. 4 (Suffolk) Super-Heavy Railway Battery RA, was stationed at Wittersham Road. Weighing 86 tonnes (85 long tons; 95 short tons) and capable of firing 9.2 inches (230 mm) shells, it was only fired once, causing all the windows in the station to break. Three GWR Dean Goods Class locomotives were on hand to move the howitzer.

== Present day ==
The Kent and East Sussex Railway extended their operations to Wittersham Road on 5 March 1977, following the replacement of a bridge over the Newmill Channel. It was however a further 15 months before a replacement station building could be provided, British Rail having levelled the station site following the closure of the line. A collection of items was sourced from Heathfield, Cranbrook and Deal the station building itself came from Borth on the Cambrian Line in Wales. The rebuilt station was officially opened by Edward Heath MP on 16 June 1978. A water tower from Shrewsbury Abbey on Colonel Stephens' Shropshire and Montgomeryshire Railway was later erected on site in April 1980.

== Services ==
Preceding station	Heritage railways	Following station
Rolvenden	Kent and East Sussex Railway	Northiam
	Disused railways	
Rolvenden	British Railways; Southern Region; Kent and East Sussex Railway	Northiam
