= Hugh Walters (actor) =

British actor (1939–2015)

- Photo © Peter Hall
- Born: Hugh Thornton Walters; 2 March 1939; Mexborough, West Riding of Yorkshire, England
- Died: 13 February 2015 (aged 75); London, England
- Occupation: Actor

Hugh Thornton Walters (2 March 1939 – 13 February 2015) was a British actor.

During the early 1990s, Hugh Walters appeared regularly on The Russ Abbot Show, and he played a recurring role in the Channel 4 sitcom Chance in a Million. His films include Catch Us If You Can (1965), Jules Verne's Rocket to the Moon (1967), Alfie Darling (1975), George and Mildred (1980), Brimstone and Treacle (1982), The Missionary (1982), 1984 (1984), The Innocent Sleep (1995) and Firelight (1997). He also appeared as car salesman Mr Pendlebury in All Creatures Great and Small.

In 1975, Hugh Walters replaced Terry Scully in the role of Vic Thatcher late in the first series of the BBC series Survivors. Scully had appeared in four episodes, but then suffered a nervous breakdown, leaving the Survivors production team no choice but to recast the role. Walters played Vic in episodes 11 and 13 of the first series. He was also in an episode of On the Buses as the drunken groom and appeared as a photographer in an episode of the sitcom The Brittas Empire.

== Selected filmography ==
- Catch Us If You Can (1965) – Grey
- Doctor Who (1965) – William Shakespeare in The Chase
- Jules Verne's Rocket to the Moon (1967) – Carruthers
- Nicholas Nickleby (1968, TV Series) – Smike (Voice)
- On the Buses (1971) – Bill
- The Train Now Standing (1972–1973, TV Series) – Peter Pringle
- Alfie Darling (1975) – Hugh, Advertising Man
- Survivors (1975, TV Series) – Vic Thatcher
- The Ghosts of Motley Hall (1976) – Geoffrey
- Doctor Who (1976) – Runcible in The Deadly Assassin
- George and Mildred (1980) – Waiter
- Private Schulz (1980) – Bus Conductor
- The Monster Club (1981) – Art Director (uncredited)
- The Agatha Christie Hour – Dodds
- Brimstone and Treacle (1982) – Man
- The Missionary (1982) – Fermleigh's Doctor
- 1984 (1984) – Artsem Lecturer
- Doctor Who (1985) – Vogel in Revelation of the Daleks
- Chance in a Million (1985) – Mr Little (Series 2 & 3)
- The Innocent Sleep (1995) – Lewis
- Firelight (1997) – Dr Geddes
- Heartbeat (1999–2004, TV Series) – Mr Jones / Arthur Sykes
- Cor, Blimey! (2000, TV Movie) – Charles Hawtrey
