= The Train Now Standing =

British television series

- Genre: Sitcom
- Written by: Jon Watkins; John Swallow; Ian La Frenais; Geoff Rowley; Andy Baker
- Starring: Bill Fraser; Hugh Walters; Pamela Cundell; Norman Mitchell
- Country of origin: United Kingdom
- No. of series: 2
- No. of episodes: 15

Production
- Producer: Derrick Goodwin
- Running time: 30 minutes
- Production company: London Weekend Television

Original release
- Network: ITV
- Release: 20 May 1972 – 2 September 1973

The Train Now Standing is a British sitcom that aired on ITV from 1972 to 1973. Set in a quiet country railway station, the series starred Bill Fraser, known by that point for playing Snudge in the sitcoms The Army Game and Bootsie and Snudge.

== Filming ==
The outdoor scenes for The Train Now Standing were filmed at the then disused Bodiam railway station in East Sussex.

== Cast ==
- Bill Fraser – Hedley Green
- Hugh Walters – Peter Pringle
- Pamela Cundell – Rosie (series 1)
- Norman Mitchell – George (series 1)
- Bartlett Mullins – Mr Foskins (series 1)
- Arthur White – Fred (series 1)
- George Waring – Bill (series 1)
- Geoff L'Cise – Charlie (series 1)
- Denis Lill – Mr Potts (series 1)
- Garfield Morgan – Mr Pitts (series 1)
- Brenda Peters – Brenda (series 2)
- Ken Wynne – Ken (series 2)

== Plot ==
War veteran Hedley Green has been the station master of Burberry Halt railway station for 30 years. It is a quiet, run-down country station on the Milchester line that sees three trains a day. Hedley stills wears the uniform of the Great Western Railway and uses a 1933 rule book. He is assisted by Peter Pringle. Hedley and Peter's time is mostly spent dealing with crises caused by the area manager Mr Potts, who is later replaced by Mr Pitts.

== Episodes ==
Two series of The Train Now Standing aired on ITV. The first series broadcast on Saturdays mostly at 5.10pm and the second on Sundays at 9.30pm. All 15 episodes exist in the archives.

=== Series One (1972) ===
| Episode Number | Original Broadcast Date |
|---|---|
| 1 | 20 May 1972 |
| 2 | 27 May 1972 |
| 3 | 3 June 1972 |
| 4 | 10 June 1972 |
| 5 | 17 June 1972 |
| 6 | 24 June 1972 |
| 7 | 1 July 1972 |

=== Series Two (1973) ===
| Episode Number | Original Broadcast Date |
|---|---|
| 1 | 8 July 1973 |
| 2 | 15 July 1973 |
| 3 | 22 July 1973 |
| 4 | 29 July 1973 |
| 5 | 5 August 1973 |
| 6 | 12 August 1973 |
| 7 | 19 August 1973 |
| 8 | 2 September 1973 |
