= Dixter Halt railway station =

Railway station in East Sussex, England

Coordinates: 51.003543°N 0.585031°E

Dixter Halt

General information
- Location: Great Dixter nr Northiam, Rother; England
- Grid reference: TQ814258
- Platforms: 1

Other information
- Status: Disused

History
- Original company: Kent and East Sussex Railway

Key dates
- 25 May 1981: Opened
- 1983: last train called
Location

Dixter Halt was a short-lived halt station on the Kent and East Sussex Railway on an unmade road leading to Great Dixter house near Northiam in East Sussex. Opened in May 1981 it was used for occasional special services to and from Bodiam until 1983. The station was subsequently demolished in preparation for reopening the line from Northiam for regular passenger services to Bodiam in 2000.

== History ==
Dixter Halt was opened before the reopening of the section of the Kent and East Sussex Railway (KESR) between Northiam and Bodiam. It was located at the point where the grounds of Great Dixter house adjoin the line. The station was ceremonially opened on 25 May 1981, the first train to call being hauled by a Peckett 0-4-0T Marcia and composed of a former District Railway coach and an ex-LNWR brake van. These services continued on Bank Holidays and other special occasions until the August Bank Holiday in 1983, the Thameside Area Group of the KESR using the halt for their Steam at Bodiam Events.

Preceding station	Disused railways	Following station
Northiam	KESR	Bodiam

== Present day ==
The halt was demolished during construction work of reopening the line between Northiam and Bodiam. The unmade road and occupation level crossing adjacent to the site are still in use by the local farmer.
