= Tenterden Town railway station =

Railway station in Kent, England

Tenterden Town
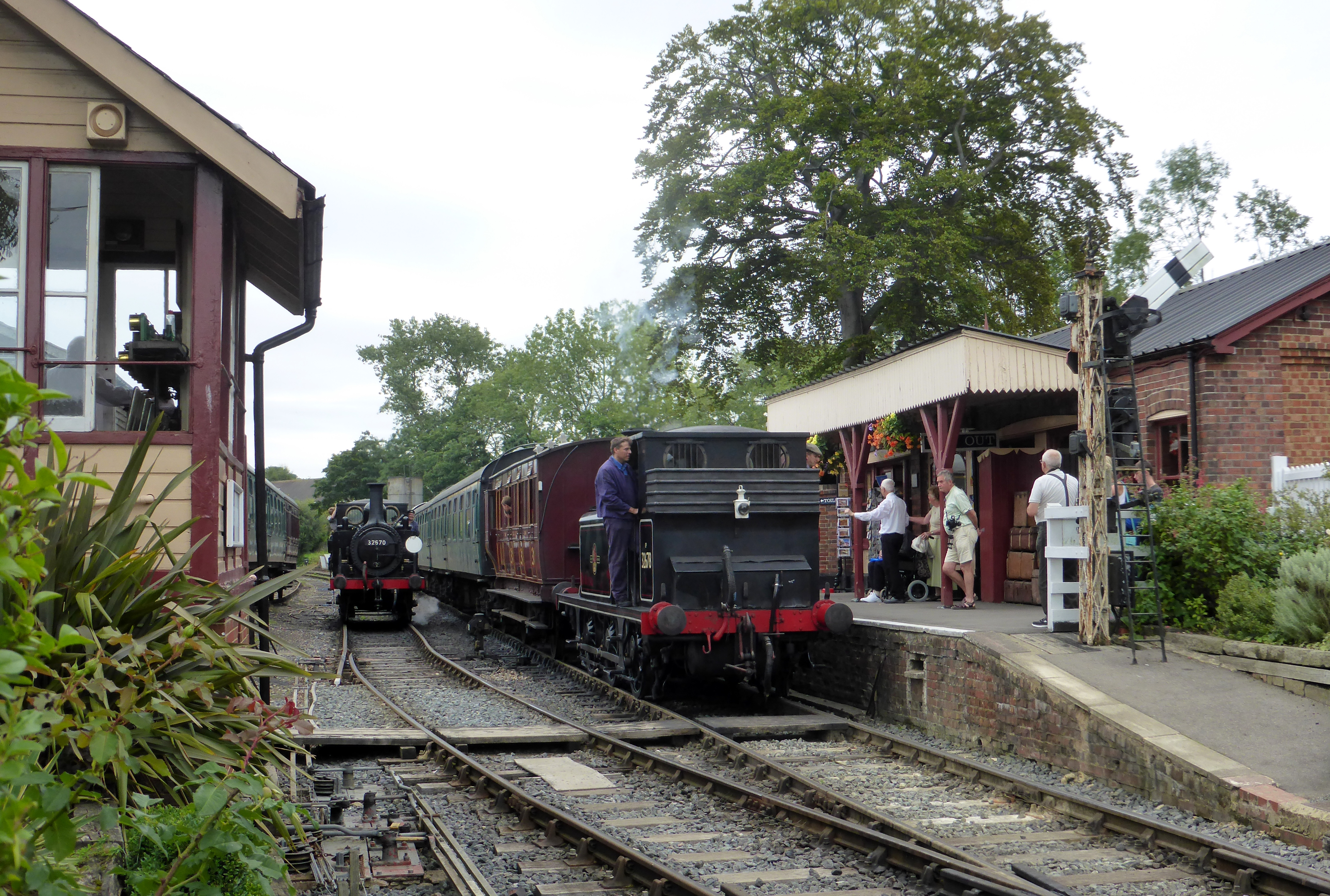

General information
- Location: Tenterden, Ashford; England
- Coordinates: 51.06997°N 0.68487°E
- Grid reference: TQ882335
- System: Station on heritage railway
- Platforms: 1

History
- Original company: Rother Valley Railway
- Pre-grouping: Kent and East Sussex Railway
- Post-grouping: Kent and East Sussex Railway; Southern Region of British Railways

Key dates
- 16 March 1903: Opened
- 4 January 1954: Closed to passengers
- 12 June 1961: Closed to freight
- 3 February 1974: Station reopened
Location

Tenterden Town railway station is a heritage railway station on the Kent and East Sussex Railway in Tenterden, Kent, England.

When the railway line first opened in 1900, Rolvenden Station was known as "Tenterden". Its name was changed when the line extended north three years later and a station closer to Tenterden was constructed. The new Tenterden Town station opened on 16 March 1903. The line closed for regular passenger services on 4 January 1954 and all traffic in 1961. It reopened on 3 February 1974 under the aegis of the Tenterden Railway Company which bought the line between Tenterden and Bodiam. The station now houses the KESR's Carriage and Wagon works, and the Colonel Stephens Museum is located nearby.

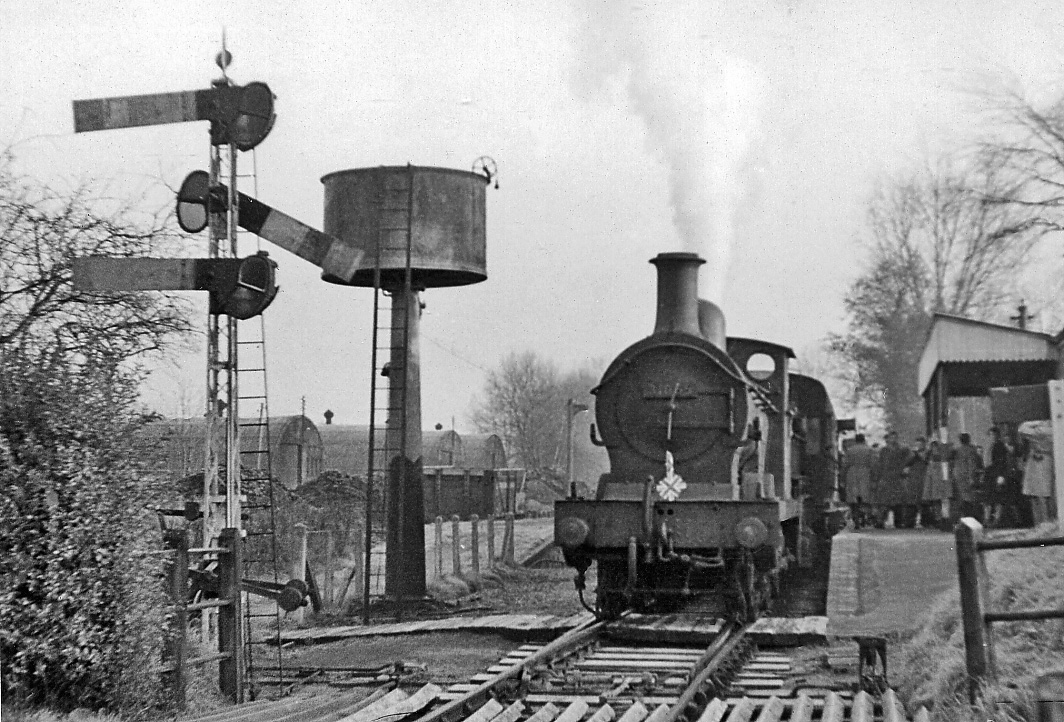
Last Day of service in 1954

== Services ==
Preceding station	Heritage railways	Following station
Terminus	Kent and East Sussex Railway	Rolvenden
	Disused railways	
Tenterden St. Michael's	British Railways; Southern Region; Kent and East Sussex Railway	Rolvenden
