= Robert Young Pickering =

Robert Young Pickering (1849 – 1931) was a British industrialist.

== Early life ==
Pickering was born at Railway Cottage, Shildon, County Durham, England in 1849, the eldest son of John Pickering 1823 - 1900 and Elizabeth Young 1828 - 1890. Robert's father at the time of his birth was classified as a "British Teacher". Robert's only sibling Jonathan was born in 1855. By 1861 the family had moved from Railway Cottage to Main Street, Shildon. John Pickering had over the past ten years changed his profession from teacher to proprietor and head of an iron foundry employing 52 men and four boys.

== Family move to Scotland ==
In 1864 John Pickering moved his family to Scotland and set about constructing his new works in Netherton Wishaw Lanarkshire, which came on stream in 1865. Robert, aged 16, joined his father in the new operation in Wishaw, building railway carriages, wagons and carrying out repairs on rolling stock. In December 1868 at 3 Park Gardens, Glasgow, the home of his in-laws, Robert Young Pickering married Ellen Caldwell Anderson, the daughter of John Anderson, a wealthy Glasgow merchant. Robert and his wife remained at 3 Park Gardens living with her family into the 1880s, this was where his only child was born Robina Ellinor Graham (1873–1916). He lived with his family until 1896 at 19 Montgomerie Quadrant Kelvinside. He was involved with St Brides church adjacent to this building.

== Company history ==
Pickering's of Wishaw expanded and by 1870 they were employing around 150 men and 50 boys. Over the next few years the tide changed and in 1878 the business was on the verge of collapse with a workforce reduced to 14 men, one foreman and a dog.

Robert took control of the business from his father and over the next decade built the business into a thriving railway carriage and wagon fabricators. The expansion included the opening of a second depot at Rawyards, in nearby Airdrie with now a workforce of around 500.

To compete as an international player Robert required to raise capital and in 1888 floated the business as a private limited company as R Y Pickering & Co Ltd, with himself as managing director. On the formation of the new company Robert was paid £4,000 in cash and £4,000 in ordinary shares. By 1906 his shares were worth £70,000 however he was no longer the majority shareholder this he had lost back in 1901 to John Wilson a Lanarkshire coal magnate.

At the end of the 19th century Robert Young Pickering purchased the Dumfriesshire estate of Conheath and through the Edwardian years carried out major improvements. In the 1901 census we find his nephew John Johnston King Pickering 1880–1914 son of his brother Jonathan, living with Robert and Ellen at the mansion house of Conheath. John was employed by R Y Pickering & Co Ltd as Roberts assistant.

In 1903 Roberts daughter Robina was married in Dumfries to her cousin John J K Pickering. In earlier writings on R Y Pickering, John was referred to as his son, rather than nephew/son-in-law. With the marriage came additional rewards with John being appointed company secretary in 1904. Also in this year John and Robina provided Robert with his only grandchild Christopher Robert Pickering.

R Y Pickering & Co Ltd found the first decade of the 20th century challenging times with dwindling profits and the loss of home market share. Expansion of the repair sector helped to offset some of this with new depots in Fife and Sheffield. The company looked at oversees orders in particular India and South Africa. Life must have become very tough for Robert Pickering in 1909, with mounting personal debts, the death of his wife Ellen and company losses of £5,628. By the following year the company loss reached almost £14,000. During 1911 he was removed from the position of managing director the post he held from the formation in 1888 in the company, which held his name. He had no further involvement in the company and retired to the life of a country gentleman at Conheath.

== Retirement ==
A year after the death of his wife, Robert remarried in the spring of 1910 to Isabelle Edith Jardine the daughter of Sir Alexander Jardine of Applegirth Baronet. Her family resided at Jardine Hall, near Lockerbie part of the founding family of Hong Kong and Jardine and Matheson. Her mother was Henrietta Younger of the Scottish brewing family.

His life in retirement enabled Robert to indulge in his passion for books, and to house them he extended Conheath in 1919 with a new library and billiard room, using the Ayr architect James Morris. This was not the first time he had employed Morris, in 1909 he was engaged to design a new family chapel in the Baroque style. Much of the Morris designs were never built probably due to financial restraints and a more modest Arts and Crafts design were produced by Sir Robert Lorimer. The chapel was not completed until the late 1920s. Lorimer also designed Conheath Farmhouse in 1916 in the arts and crafts style.

Robert's daughter Robina died in an Edinburgh nursing home in 1916 leaving his grandson Christopher an orphan, his father John J K Pickering having died two years earlier at the age of 34 in Natal, South Africa. Robert Young Pickering died at Conheath at the age of 82 and his second wife Isabel Edith (Jardine) died the following year. Both were interred at Conheath Chapel, with his first wife and daughter in the family crypt. The chapel with surrounding policies is the only part of Conheath estate to remain in the ownership of the Pickering family (Ralph Pickering of Kintradwell) to this day.

At his death Robert left an estate of £11,126, beside a number of small legacies, his grandson Christopher inherited everything including Conheath Estate. In 1933 the tenanted farm was sold for £6,500 and the mansion house and grounds a few years later. Christopher left Britain and settled in Cape Town where he was a government official, he married first Georgina Martin Gilmour, at Cathcart Glasgow in 1932 and divorced 1935, he later married c. 1950 Mignonne Jean 16 years his junior (died 2008 Cape Town). On 29 May 1951 Christopher's daughter Robin Anne was born to continue the Pickering dynasty.
