= Bodiam railway station =

Preservation railway station in Bodiam, Sussex, England

Bodiam
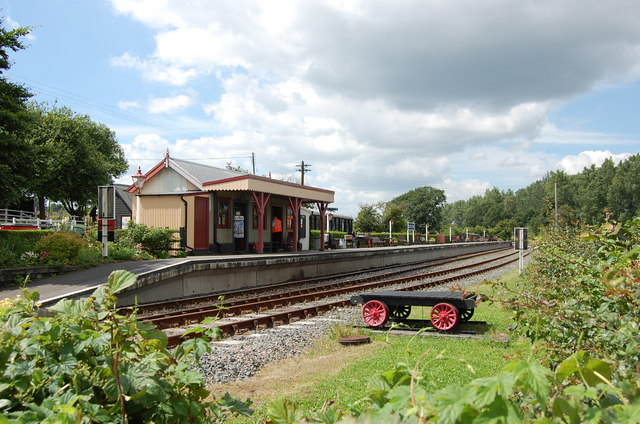

General information
- Location: Bodiam, Rother, East Sussex; England
- Coordinates: 50.99587°N 0.53948°E
- Grid reference: TQ783249
- System: Station on heritage railway
- Platforms: 1

History
- Original company: Rother Valley Railway
- Pre-grouping: Kent and East Sussex Railway
- Post-grouping: Southern Region of British Railways

Key dates
- 2 April 1900: Opened
- 4 January 1954: Closed regular passenger service
- 12 June 1961: closed completely
- 2 April 2000: Reopened
Location

Bodiam railway station is a heritage railway station on the Kent and East Sussex Railway in Bodiam, East Sussex.

== History ==
Situated half a mile from Bodiam village itself and its fourteenth century castle, the station opened in 1900 in a rather remote and rural location. It was surrounded by hop Gardens, mainly owned by Guinness, and helped to serve the industry in the area, bringing hop-pickers to and from the fields and transporting hops to the breweries. In 1910, a siding was added which effectively acted as a loop allowing freight trains to pass passenger trains. The station was known as "Bodiam for Staplecross".

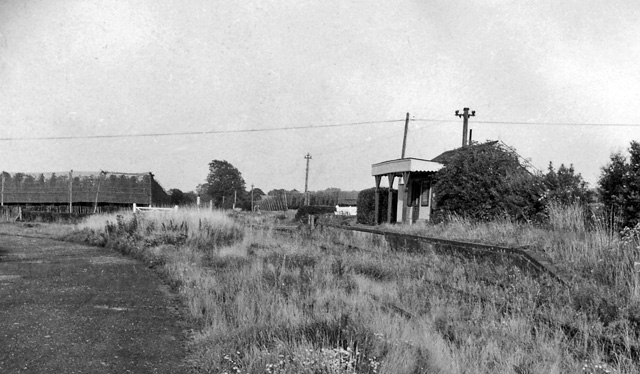
View eastwards in 1962

In keeping with other stations on the line, the main station building was fitted out in typical spartan style. Only Gents toilet facilities were available and the urinal was flushed using water gathered in the building's rainwater pipe.

Dwindling passenger numbers and increased competition from road hauliers saw the line close to regular passenger services in 1954 but freight and occasional special passenger trains used the line until 1961. It was subsequently rescued in 1971 by the Tenterden Railway Company (now the Kent and East Sussex Railway) who purchased the line between Tenterden and Bodiam for £60,000. Its extension to Bodiam was completed in 2000 and the station now marks the line's southern terminus.

The Cavell Van, the railway van that conveyed Edith Cavell's remains from Dover to London is kept as a memorial and is usually open to view at Bodiam railway station. The van also carried the bodies of Charles Fryatt and The Unknown Warrior.

Also The Train Now Standing was filmed there.

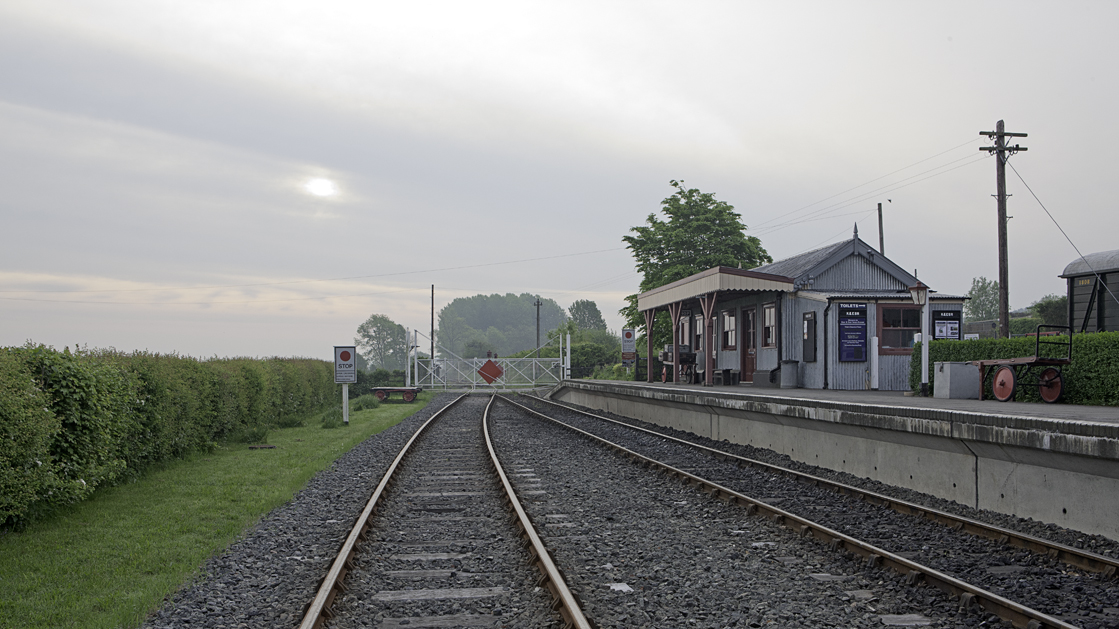
Bodiam Station looking East 2008 at 5:30am

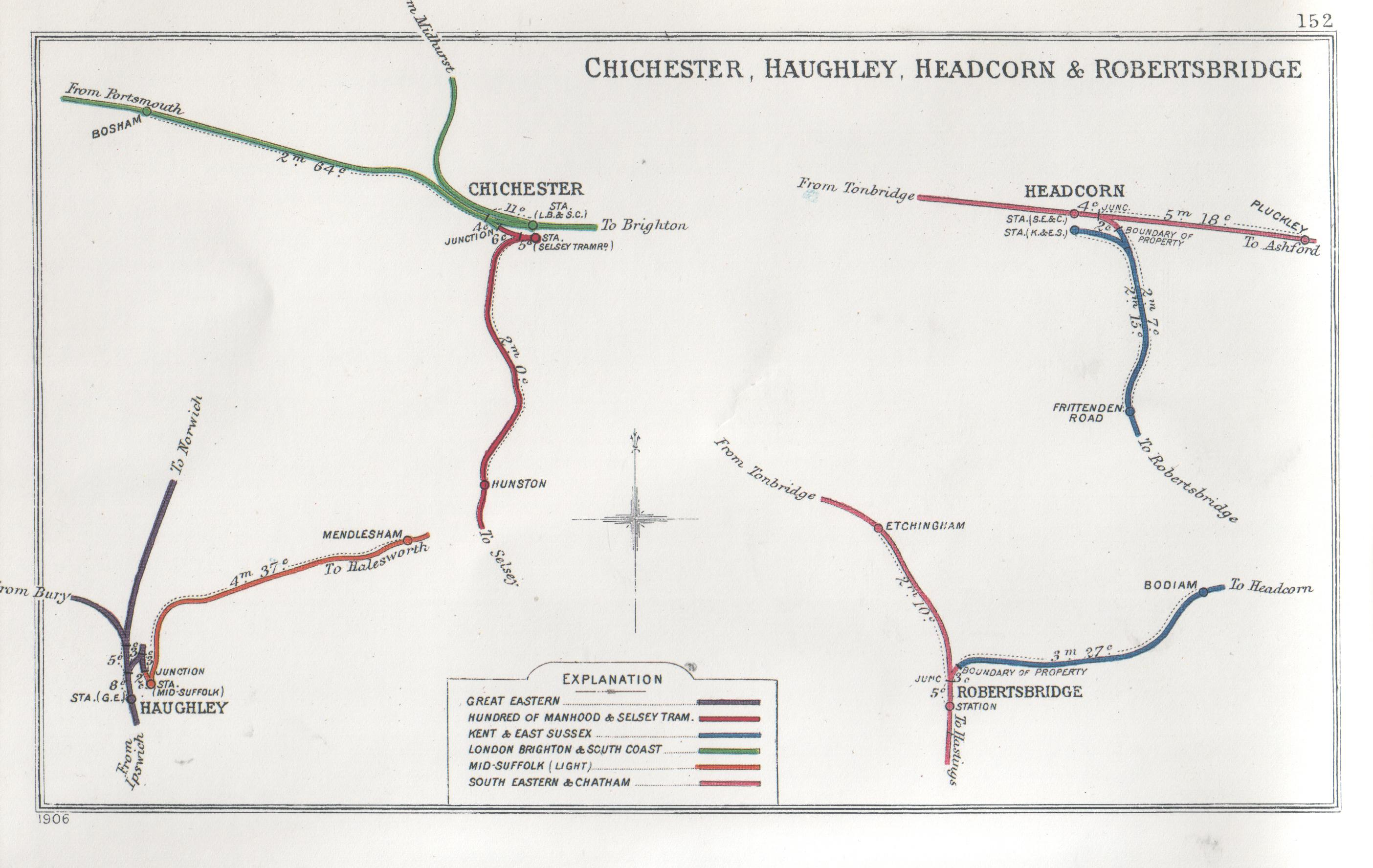
A 1914 Railway Clearing House map of the KESR and mainline to the west of Bodiam railway station.

== Services ==
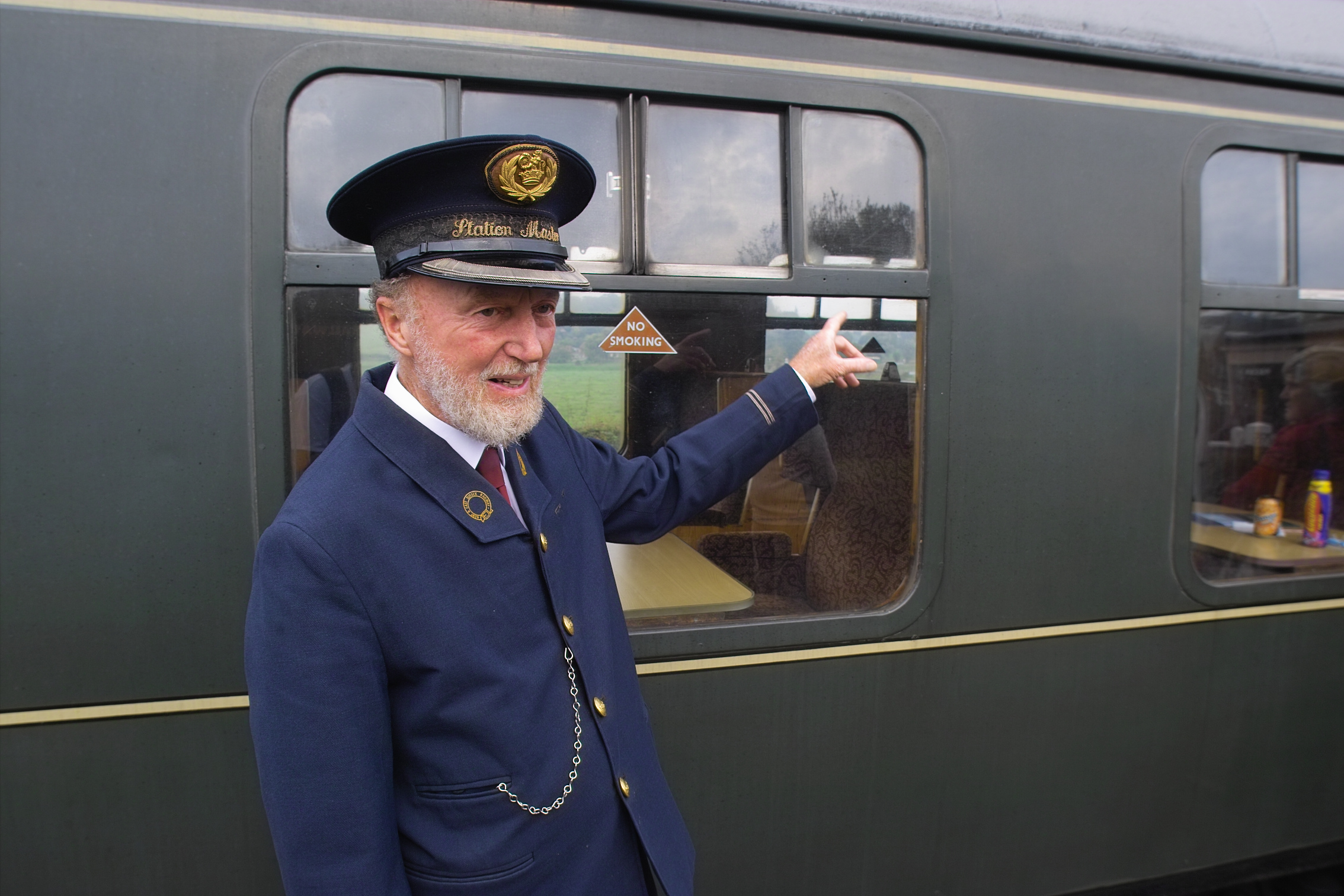
Bodiam's Station Master, 2005

Preceding station	Heritage railways	Following station
Northiam	Kent and East Sussex Railway	Terminus
	Disused railways	
Dixter Halt	Kent and East Sussex Railway	Terminus
Northiam	British Railways; Southern Region; Kent and East Sussex Railway	Junction Road Halt
