= Rolvenden railway station =

Former railway station in England

Rolvenden
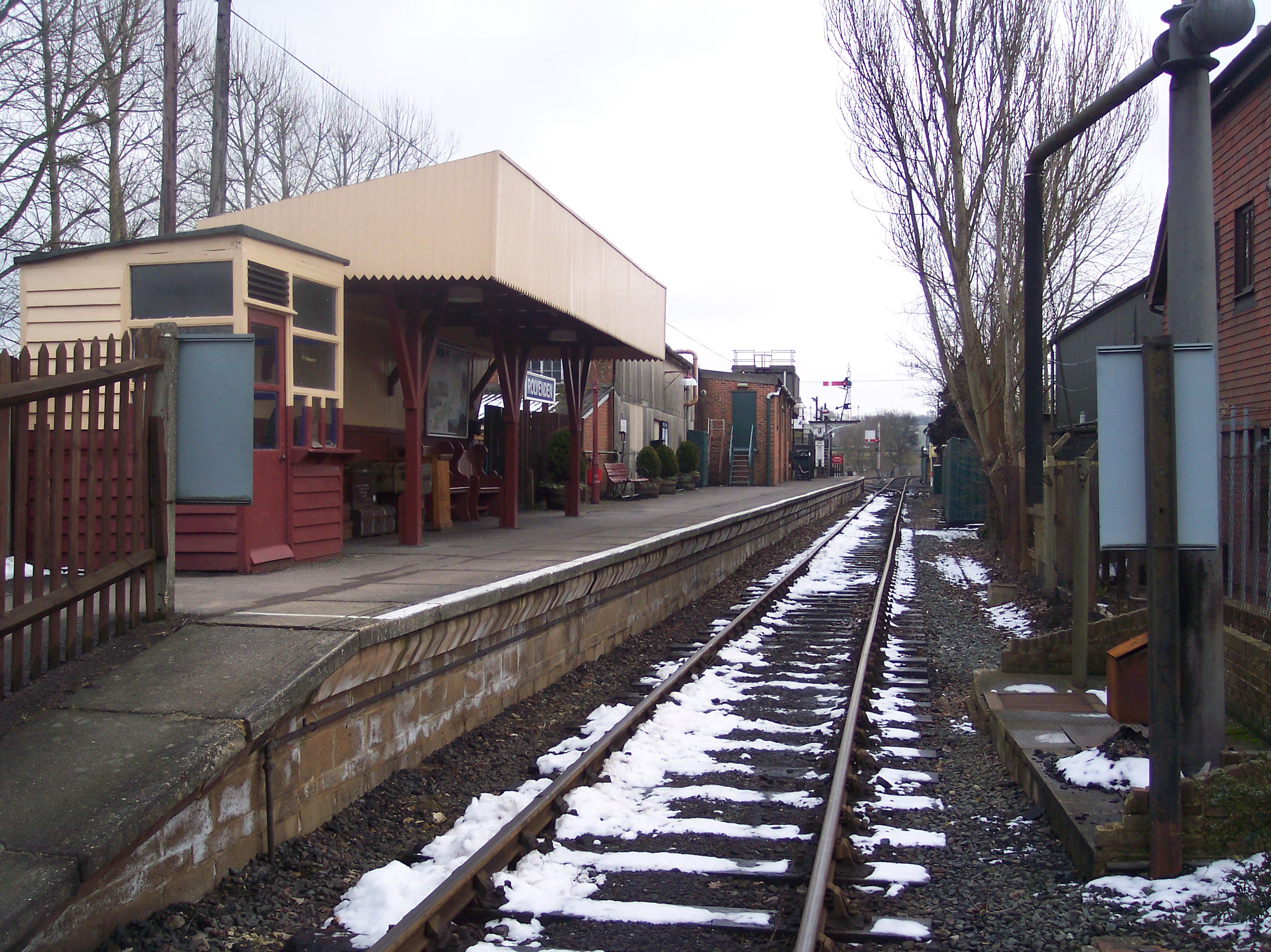

General information
- Location: Rolvenden, Ashford, Kent; England
- Coordinates: 51.06337°N 0.65879°E
- Grid reference: TQ864327
- System: Station on heritage railway
- Owner: Southern Region of British Railways
- Manager: KESR
- Platforms: 1

Key dates
- 2 April 1900: Opened as "Tenterden"
- 16 March 1903: Renamed "Rolvenden"
- 4 January 1954: Closed to passengers
- 12 June 1961: Closed to freight
- 3 February 1974: Station reopened
Location

Rolvenden railway station is a heritage railway station on the Kent and East Sussex Railway in Tenterden, Kent, in the United Kingdom.

== Early history ==
The station was originally opened as Tenterden but was renamed Rolvenden in 1903 when the current Tenterden Town station opened. The name Rolvenden is not really appropriate, the station is 2 miles from the village and is closer to Tenterden. When Colonel Stephens first opened the railway Rolvenden served as his locomotive workshop in a similar capacity to today. However the limited machinery and space meant during the 1930s it became harder to overhaul the line's ageing fleet. Most engines were sent to Ashford works to be overhauled. The locomotive shed and passenger station closed in 1954 and both were subsequently demolished. Freight services continued until 1961. After British Railways closed the railway the site of the original locomotive shed was sold for light industrial buildings.

== Heritage Railway Society history ==
The Kent and East Sussex Railway built a new locomotive shed on the other side of the line from the original. Currently the station is home to the Kent and East Sussex Railway's loco department who are responsible for the restoration and maintenance of steam engines owned by the railway. The loco department is one of the most crucial contributors to the railway's success. The site consists of a two track shed which has enough space for around 4 locomotives. The railway also owns the field next to it and has plans to use at least part of it as a car park. Rolvenden is also the coaling depot and this is where all the locomotives are prepared for a day's work. It now has a signal box, water tower and passing loop. The station was rebuilt when the line reopened in 1974.

== Services ==
Preceding station	Heritage railways	Following station
Tenterden Town	Kent and East Sussex Railway	Wittersham Road
	Disused railways	
Tenterden Town	British Railways; Southern Region; Kent and East Sussex Railway	Wittersham Road

== Steam Locomotives in residence ==
- Number 3 LB&SCR A1 Class 0-6-0T (Terrier) 'Bodiam'. Overhaul completed and suffered a failure. Awaiting extensive repairs to the bottom end.
- Number 8 LB&SCR A1 Class 0-6-0T (Terrier) 'Knowle'. Awaiting Overhaul.
- Number 11 SECR P Class 0-6-0T. Pending major overhaul
- Number 12 (Small 0-4-0T) 'Marcia'. In Traffic
- Number 14 (Industrial 0-6-0T) 'Charwelton'. Under sub-contract overhaul with JM Engineering at Quainton Road
- Number 19 Norwegian 2-6-0 . Out of service pending overhaul.
- Number 21 SR USA Class DS238 0-6-0T 'Wainwright'. Undergoing Overhaul
- Number 22 SR USA Class 0-6-0T 'Maunsell'. Pending Overhaul
- Number 23 Standard War Department 0-6-0ST 'Holman F Stephens'. Awaiting major overhaul.
- Number 24 Standard War Department 0-6-0ST 'Rolvenden'. Sold, no longer at the railway
- Number 25 Standard War Department 0-6-0ST 'Northiam'. In Service
- Number 30 GWR 1600 Class 0-6-0PT no. 1638. At Leaky Finders for overhaul.
- Number 1 No. 1 Thomas the Tank Engine. In service. The railway had loaned a loco for its annual Thomas & Friends events. No longer visiting.
- Number N/A Merioneth and Llantisilly Rail Traction Company Limited Ivor the Engine 0-4-0T. Loaned for the yearly Ivor the Engine Weekends. Has the strange award of being the last engine to be overhauled at Swindon Works, before closure. No longer visiting.
- Number 4253 GWR 42xx Class 0-8-0T Later stage over overhaul.
- Number 6619 GWR 66xx Class 0-6-2T Pending major overhaul
- Number 15 0-6-0T 'Hastings' In Traffic.
- Number WD132 Standard War Department 0-6-0ST 'Sapper'. In Service. (On Loan)
- Number 75008 Standard War Department 0-6-0ST 'Swiftsure'. In Service. (On Loan)
