= Rother Valley Railway =

Heritage railway in East Sussex, England

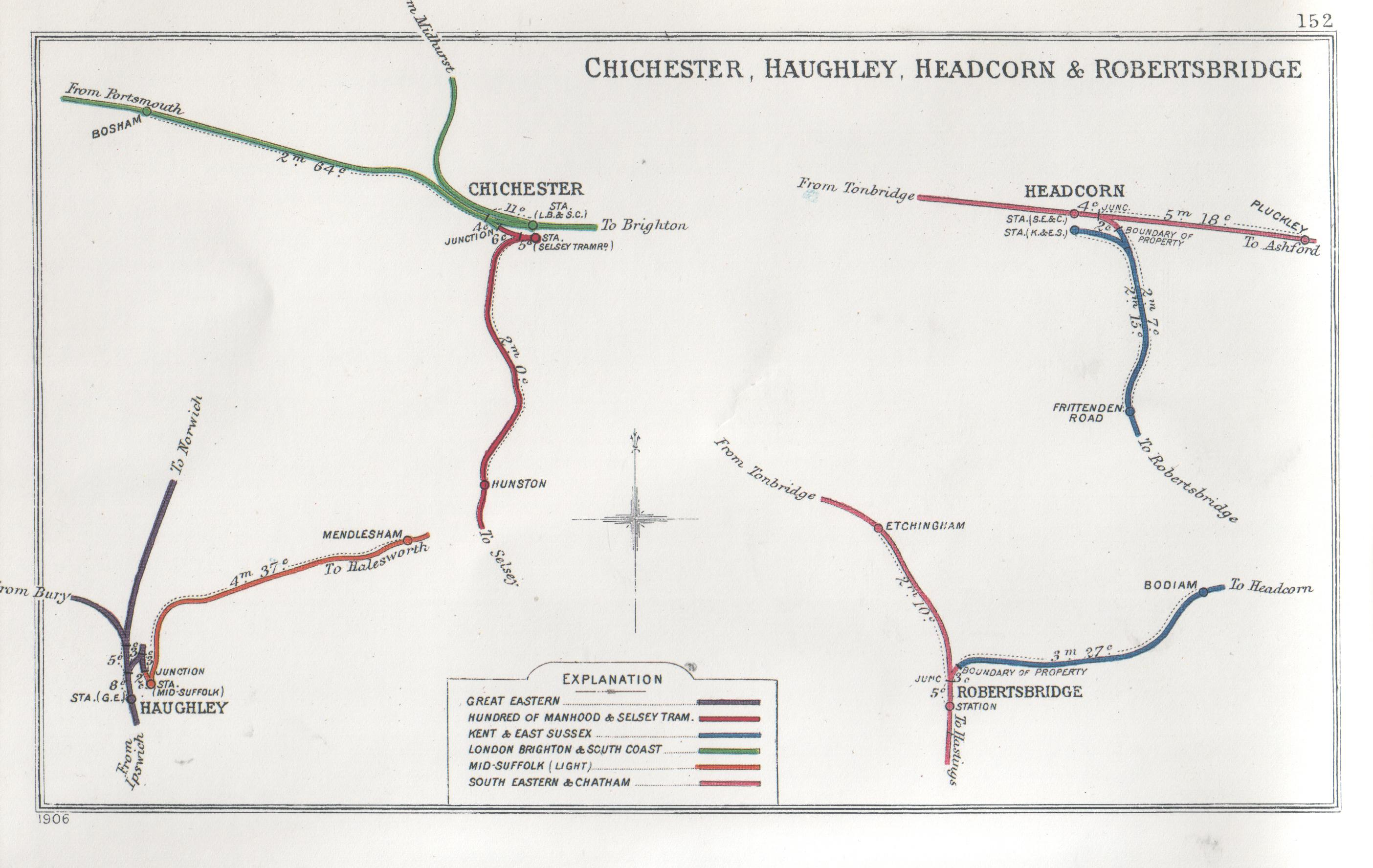
A 1914 Railway Clearing House map of both ends of the Kent and East Sussex Railway, note the Rother Valley Railway and Robertsbridge railway station.

The Rother Valley Railway (RVR) is a heritage railway project based at Robertsbridge in East Sussex, England. It takes its name from the original name for what later became the Kent and East Sussex Railway, running from Robertsbridge through to Headcorn in Kent, via Tenterden. The project is to replace the "missing link" between Robertsbridge, a station on the Tonbridge to Hastings mainline, and Bodiam on the Kent and East Sussex Railway, a heritage railway which operates from Bodiam to Tenterden.

Following a public inquiry in 2021, the government approved the project in May 2023 and granted the RVR's application for a Transport and Works Act Order. This came into force on 2 August, allowing the reinstatement scheme to be completed. The scheme aims to provide an end-on link with the Kent and East Sussex at Bodiam enabling through-running of passenger trains between Tenterden and Robertsbridge for the first time since 1954. Heritage trains will make use of the Rother Valley Railway's own new station at Robertsbridge Junction, a short walk from the mainline station. Work has begun on the final phase of reinstatement.

== Construction ==
Reinstatement work at either end of the railway has already been completed. The remainder consists of a distance of about 2.5 miles (4.0 kilometres). The scheme has met resistance from two landowners.

On 16 March 2017, Rother District Council granted planning permission for the reinstatement of the line between Northbridge Street and Junction Road. In 2018, the RVR applied for a Transport and Works Act order to give the statutory powers to complete the reinstatement of the line and operate it.

On 9 May 2023 it was announced that the Secretary of State had decided to make the Transport and Works Order. Work to reinstate the level crossing at Northgate Street, Robertsbridge began on 27 July 2026. Completion of the link is estimated for Easter 2028.

== Rolling stock ==
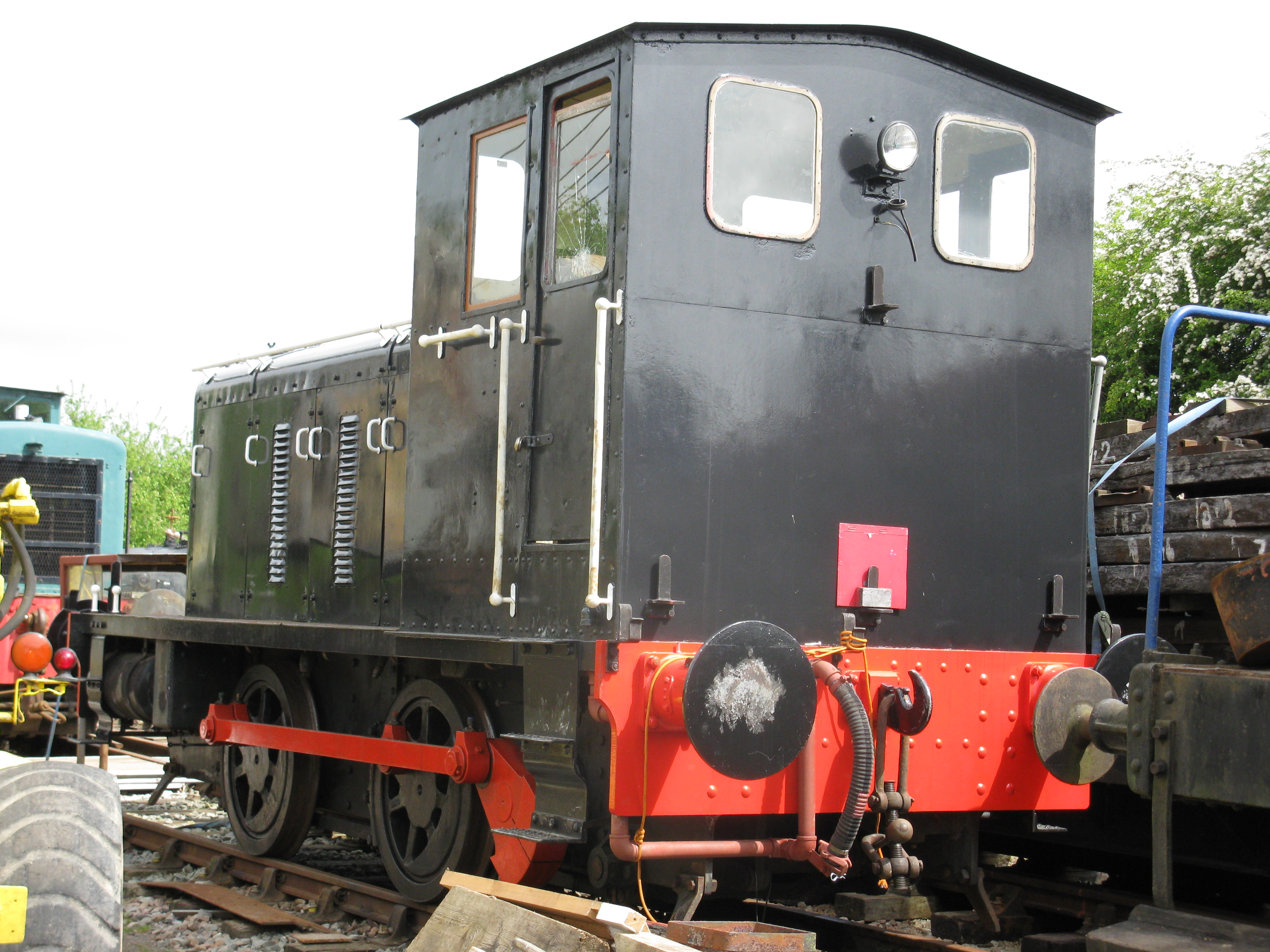
D140 "Titan" at Robertsbridge

The following locomotives are on site

- "Titan", a Drewry 0-4-0DM shunter, Vulcan Foundry works number D140.
- "Dougal", a Drewry 0-4-0 shunter, Vulcan Foundry works number D77.
- D2112, an ex-BR class 03 0-6-0DM shunter.

In addition are a number of other wagons and carriages undergoing or awaiting restoration.

== See also ==
- Colonel Stephens
