= Biddenden railway station =

Disused railway station in Ashford, Kent, England

Coordinates: 51.12235°N 0.64571°E

Biddenden
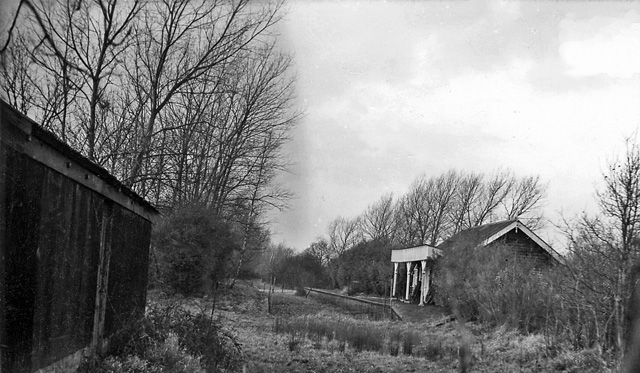
- Station in February 1967.

General information
- Location: Biddenden, Ashford; England
- Grid reference: TQ853392
- Platforms: 2

Other information
- Status: Disused

History
- Pre-grouping: Kent and East Sussex Railway
- Post-grouping: Southern Region of British Railways

Key dates
- 15 May 1905: Station opened
- 4 January 1954: Station closed
Location

Biddenden was a railway station on the Kent and East Sussex Railway which closed in January 1954.

As of 2014 the station building has been converted to a private house ("The Old Station") with parts of the platforms still clearly visible. The station is sited on the northern edge of the village on the A274 North Street/Headcorn Road.

Preceding station	Disused railways	Following station
Frittenden Road	British Railways; Southern Region; KESR	High Halden Road

== Present day ==
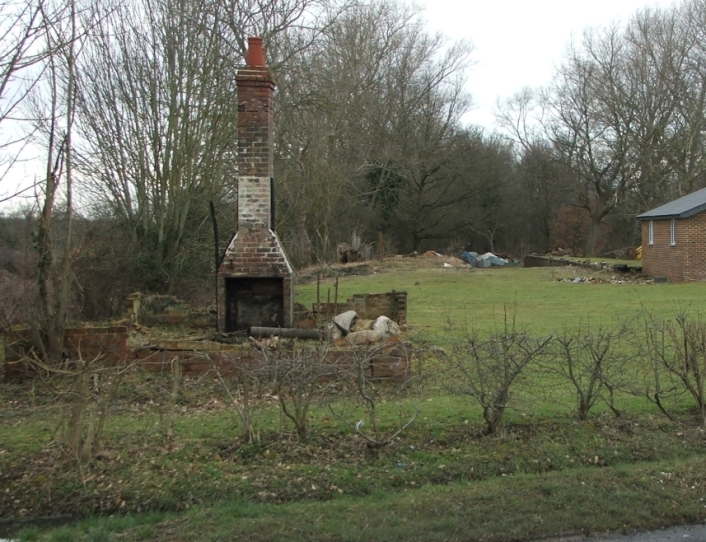
Remnants of platforms and brickwork still visible in 2009.
