= Class 395 =

Class 395 may refer to:

- British Rail Class 395
- LSWR 395 class
