= High Halden Road railway station =

Former railway station in England

Coordinates: 51.0995°N 0.6801°E

High Halden Road
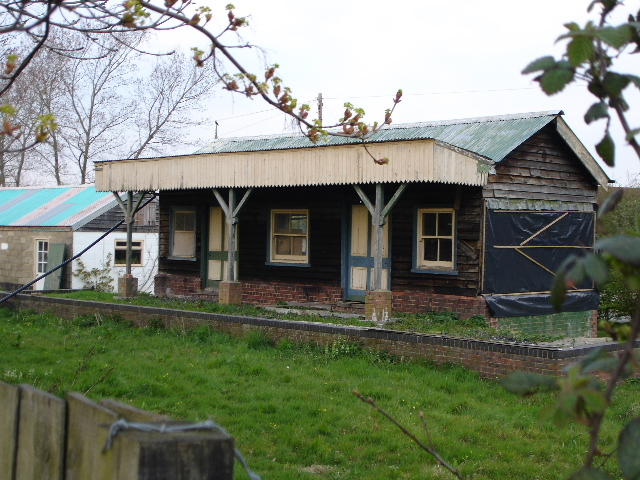

General information
- Location: High Halden, Ashford; England
- Grid reference: TQ877368
- Platforms: 1

Other information
- Status: Disused

History
- Pre-grouping: Kent and East Sussex Railway
- Post-grouping: Southern Region of British Railways

Key dates
- 15 May 1905: Station opened
- 4 January 1954: Station closed
Location

High Halden Road is a disused railway station on the defunct Kent and East Sussex Railway which closed in 1954. The station building and platform still survives as farm offices beside the A262 road.

Preceding station	Disused railways	Following station
Biddenden	British Railways; Southern Region; KESR	Tenterden St. Michael's
