= Tenterden St Michael's railway station =

Former railway station in England

Coordinates: 51.084741°N 0.687856°E

Tenterden St. Michael's
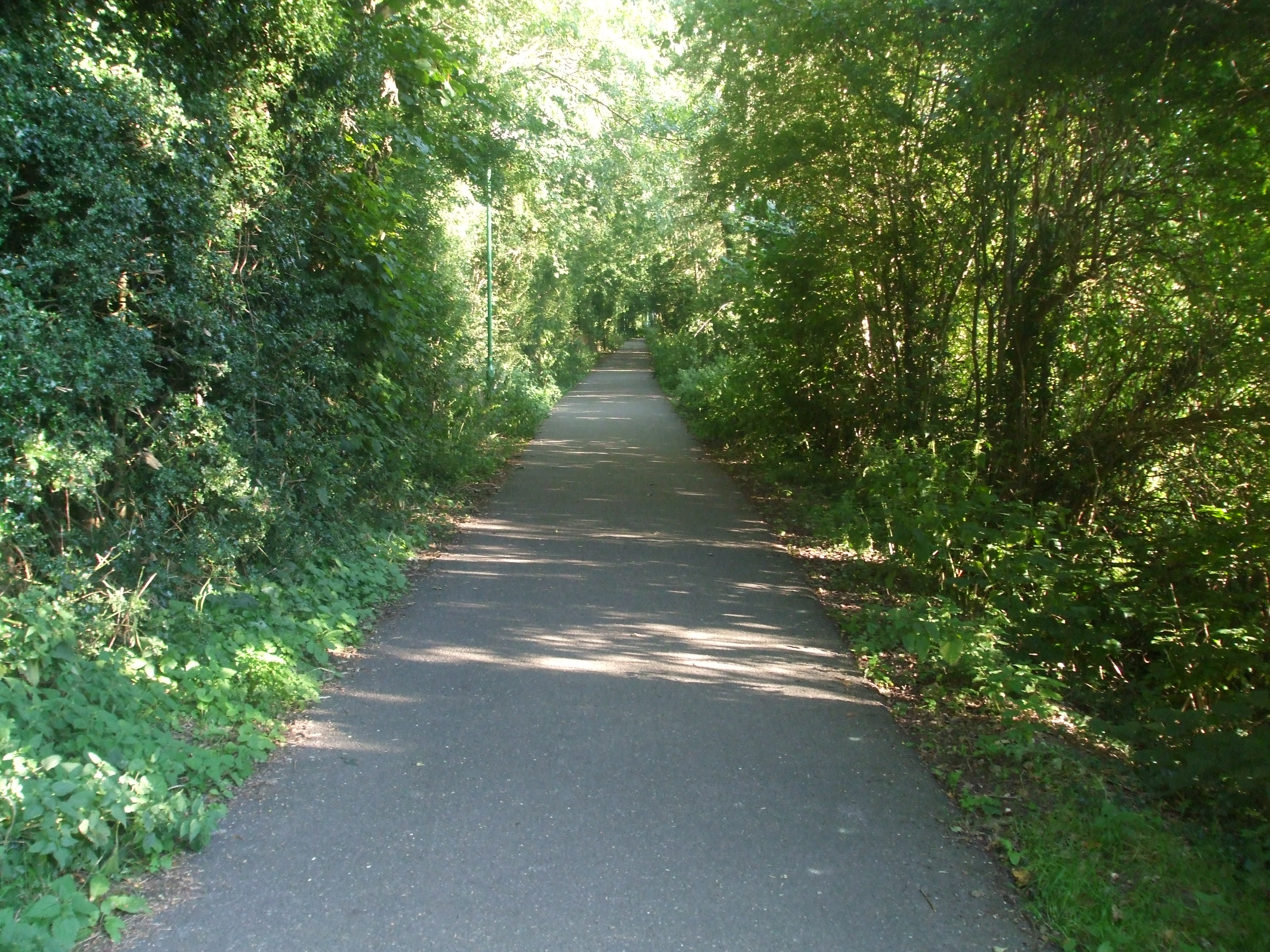
- Station site looking south towards Tenterden Town. The platform was situated on the left.

General information
- Location: St. Michaels nr Tenterden, Ashford; England
- Grid reference: TQ883351
- Platforms: 1

Other information
- Status: Disused

History
- Original company: Kent and East Sussex Railway
- Post-grouping: Kent and East Sussex Railway; Southern Region of British Railways

Key dates
- 23 November 1912: Opened
- 4 January 1954: Closed
Location

Tenterden St. Michael's was a railway station on the Kent and East Sussex Railway which served the Tenterden suburb of St Michaels in Kent, England. The station was situated on the southern side of a level crossing to the south of St. Michael's tunnel, one of the line's main civil engineering features. Closed in 1954, nothing remains of St. Michael's today: a footpath and cycleway runs through the site.

== History ==
Tenterden St. Michael's was opened in 1912 to serve the local community of St Michaels on the outskirts of Tenterden. It was situated immediately south of the ungated level crossing over Grange Road.

St. Michael's was little more than a halt station consisting of no more than a single platform made of sleepers and, for some time, a small corrugated iron hut which served as a ticket office. So modest were the facilities that the wooden picket gate leading from the road for the use of passengers has been described as "more obvious than the halt itself". By August 1938, the ticket office had closed and passengers were obliged to purchase their tickets on the train; the station had also become run-down and the track weed-strewn. It had fallen into a dangerous and decrepit state by 1953, the condition of the platform sleepers having seriously deteriorated. Regular passenger services on the line were withdrawn after the last train on Saturday 2 January 1954. The line was engineered and operated by Colonel H F Stephens. The only tunnel on the line the 31 yards long "St Michaels Tunnel" was located just north of the halt.

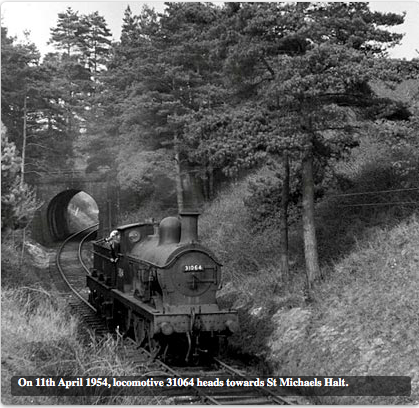
St Michaels Tunnel

Preceding station	Disused railways	Following station
High Halden Road	British Railways; Southern Region; KESR	Tenterden Town

== Present day ==
There is no trace of Tenterden St. Michael's today; its site is now a footpath and cycleway. To the north beyond the site of the level crossing over Grange Road, Orchard Road has been built along the right-of-way and St. Michael's tunnel remains beneath Shoreham Lane at grid reference TQ883354.
