= Mountfield Halt railway station =

Former railway station in England

Mountfield Halt
- Mountfield Halt, May 1936

General information
- Location: Mountfield, Rother; England
- Platforms: 2

Other information
- Status: Disused

History
- Post-grouping: Southern Railway

Key dates
- 1 August 1923: Opened
- 6 October 1969: Closed
Location

Mountfield Halt (TQ 746 197 50°57′01″N 0°29′12″E) was situated on the Hastings Line between Robertsbridge and Battle. It opened in 1923 and was closed on 6 October 1969. Both platforms were built of sleepers. The station stood just east of Battle Road (A2100) level crossing.

There are no remains of the halt today.

Preceding station	Disused railways	Following station
Robertsbridge	Southern Railway; Hastings Line	Battle
Robertsbridge	British Rail, Southern Region; Hastings Line	Battle

== Sources ==
- Kidner, R. W. (1985). Southern Railway Halts. Survey and Gazetteer. Headington, Oxford: The Oakwood Press. ISBN 0-85361-321-4.
