= Kent and East Sussex Railway =

Railway in south east England

K&ESR, KESR
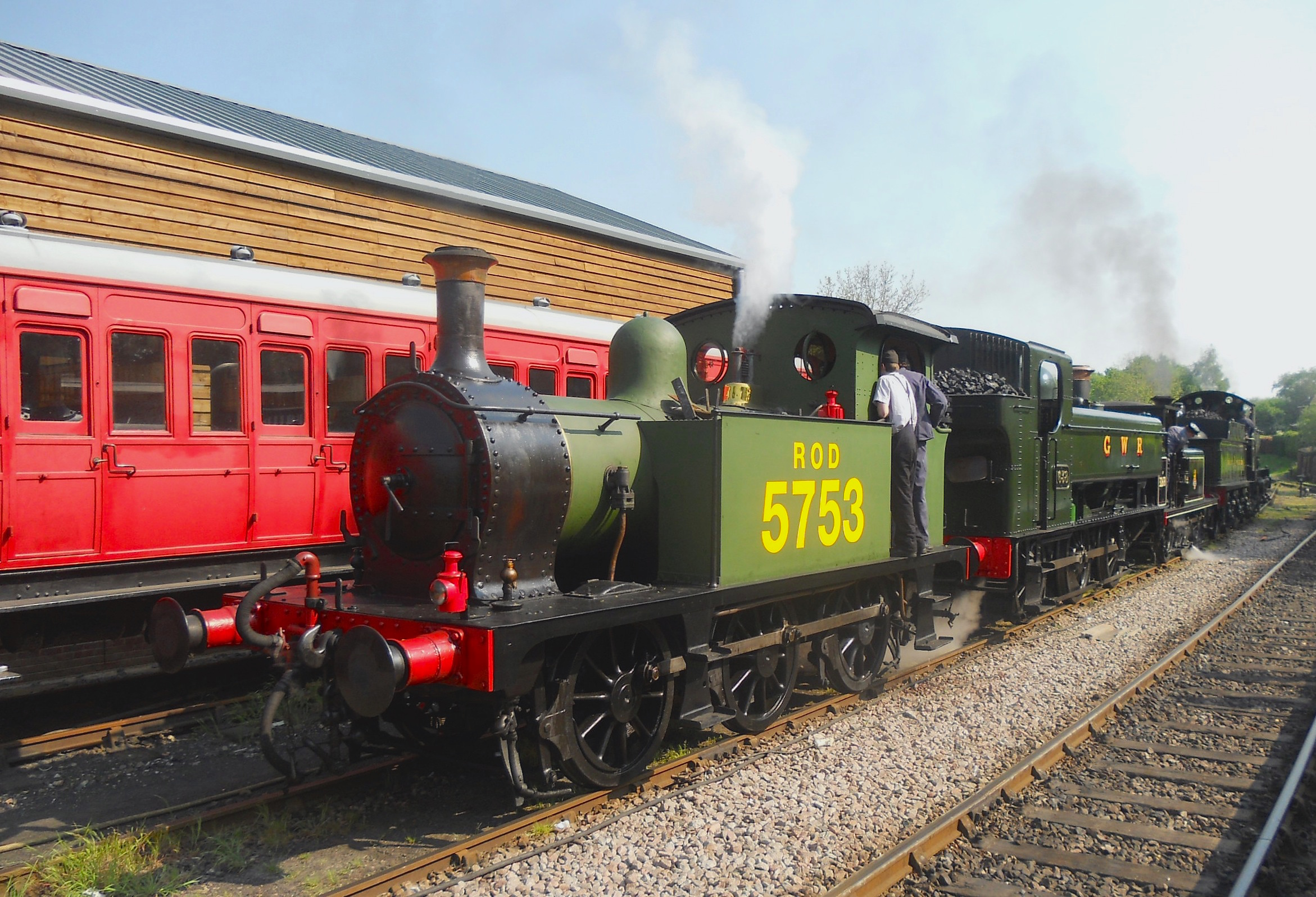
- The grand cavalcade at Tenterden Town Station during a Steam Gala on the Kent and East Sussex Railway
- Locale: Kent; East Sussex; South East England
- Terminus: Tenterden Town; Bodiam

Commercial operations
- Built by: H. F. Stephens
- Original gauge: 4 ft 8 1/2 in (1,435 mm) standard gauge

Preserved operations
- Owned by: Kent and East Sussex Railway
- Operated by: Kent and East Sussex Railway
- Stations: 5
- Length: 11.5 miles (18.5 km)
- Preserved gauge: 4 ft 8 1/2 in (1,435 mm) standard gauge

Commercial history
- Opened: Freight: 26 March 1900; Passenger: 2 April 1900
- Closed to passengers: 4 January 1954
- Closed: 12 June 1961

Preservation history
- 1974: Partial re-opening
- 1977: Line extends and re-opened to Wittersham Road
- 1990: Line extends and re-opened to Northiam
- 2000: Line extends and re-opened to Bodiam
- 2011: Line extends to Junction Road Halt (no station built or planned, special events only)
- Headquarters: Tenterden Town (main facility); Rolvenden (loco depot)

Website
- www.kesr.org.uk

The Kent and East Sussex Railway (K&ESR) refers to both a historical private railway company in Kent and East Sussex in England, as well as a heritage railway currently running on part of the route of the historical company. The railway runs between Tenterden Town and Bodiam.

A separate railway preservation effort, the Rother Valley Railway, is restoring track at the western end between Robertsbridge Junction and Bodiam.

== Historical company ==
=== Background ===
By the mid 19th century, Tenterden was in the middle of a triangle of railway lines. The South Eastern Railway had opened its line from Redhill to Tonbridge on 12 July 1841. The line was opened as far as Headcorn on 31 August 1842 and to Ashford on 1 December 1843. The South Eastern Railway opened its line from Ashford to Hastings on 13 February 1851.

The third part of the triangle was the line between Tonbridge and Hastings which had opened as far as Tunbridge Wells on 24 November 1846, Robertsbridge on 1 September 1851, Battle on 1 January 1852 and to St Leonards on 1 February 1852, running powers over the London, Brighton and South Coast Railway's line to Hastings having been negotiated.

The Ashford–Hastings line had originally been promoted to run via Headcorn and Tenterden, but the government preferred the more southerly route. In 1855, a proposed railway from Headcorn via Cranbrook to Tenterden failed to obtain an act of Parliament. In 1864, a proposed railway from Paddock Wood via Cranbrook and Tenterden to Hythe (the Weald of Kent Railway) also failed to obtain an act of Parliament. A proposed roadside tramway from Headcorn to Tenterden suffered the same fate in 1882. In 1877, the Cranbrook and Paddock Wood Railway was incorporated, and powers obtained in the Cranbrook and Paddock Wood Railway Act 1877 (40 & 41 Vict. c. clx) to build the northern section of the Weald of Kent Railway to transport agricultural produce and livestock from low-lying land adjacent to Wittersham Road to a better mainline connection. Powers were obtained in the Cranbrook and Paddock Wood Railway Act 1882 (45 & 46 Vict. c. cxxxii) to extend the line to Hawkhurst. The line opened to Goudhurst in 1892 and Hawkhurst in 1893.

Tenterden Railway Act 1895
- Act of Parliament
- Parliament of the United Kingdom
- Long title: An Act to authorise the Construction of Railways from Headcorn to Tenterden and Appledore and for other purposes.
- Citation: 58 & 59 Vict. c. cxxxv

Dates
- Royal assent: 6 July 1895

Text of statute as originally enacted

Tenterden Railway Act 1899
- Act of Parliament
- Parliament of the United Kingdom
- Long title: An Act for conferring further powers on the Tenterden Railway Company with reference to the construction of new railways the abandonment of authorised railways and for other purposes.
- Citation: 62 & 63 Vict. c. xvii

Dates
- Royal assent: 6 June 1899

Text of statute as originally enacted

The Tenterden Railway was the next to be proposed, running from Maidstone to Hastings via Headcorn, Tenterden, and Appledore. The section from Headcorn to Appledore was authorised in 1895, and agreement was reached in 1896 with the South Eastern Railway over the operation of the line. In 1898, the proposal was abandoned in favour of extending the Cranbrook and Paddock Wood railway to Tenterden and Appledore. This was abandoned in 1899 as it was deemed too expensive to construct, and the South Eastern Railway again backed the Tenterden Railway, but no work was done and powers to construct the line lapsed in 1901.

With the passing of the Light Railways Act 1896, a group of citizens of Tenterden, led by Myles Fenton, proposed a railway line from Robertsbridge to Tenterden—the Rother Valley Railway. Assent was granted to construct the line by the Rother Valley (Light) Railway Order 1902. The contract for the construction of the line was won by London and Scottish Contract Corporation, who sub-contracted the work to Godfrey and Siddelow. The work was overseen by Holman F. Stephens, who was appointed general manager in 1899 and managing director in 1900. Stephens attained the rank of lieutenant colonel in the Territorial Army (TA) in 1916 and was subsequently known as Colonel Stephens.

=== Opening and growth ===
The Light Railways Act 1896 allowed for cheaper construction methods in return for a speed restriction. The line was authorised to be built with 56 pounds per yard (27.8 kg/m) rails but was actually built with 60 pounds per yard (29.8 kg/m) rails. Speed was to be limited to 15 miles per hour (24 km/h), but under the terms of the act was soon raised to 25 miles per hour (40 km/h). The line was opened for freight between Robertsbridge and Rolvenden on 26 March 1900, and to passenger traffic on 2 April 1900. A wind pump was provided at Robertsbridge to supply water for locomotives. The original Tenterden station, later renamed Rolvenden was some 2 miles (3.2 km) from the town. The first train departed at 7:30 am, carrying some 60.2 passengers. The lukewarm reception was partly because of the distance of the station from the town, and partly due to fears that the opening of the light railway from Robertsbridge would prevent a more heavily engineered line being built from Headcorn.

The South Eastern Railway abandoned its plans to build the Cranbrook to Appledore line; the scheme was adopted by the Rother Valley Railway. Opposition from the South Eastern Railway meant that the Tenterden to Appledore section was dropped. Authorisation was received for the Cranbrook and Tenterden Light Railway Order 1899 in December 1899 giving permission to build the Cranbrook and Tenterden Light Railway from Cranbrook via Benenden to the Tenterden terminus of the Rother Valley Railway, and to extend further into the town of Tenterden itself. The Robertsbridge and Pevensey Light Railway Order 1900 gave permission to build a line from Robertsbridge to Pevensey, which was to be worked by the Rother Valley Railway. The East Sussex Light Railway was authorised by the East Sussex Light Railway Order 1901. This was a line from Northiam to Rye. Only the section from the original Tenterden terminus to Tenterden Town was actually built of all these schemes.

The extension to Tenterden Town opened on 15 April 1903. The original Tenterden station was renamed Rolvenden on this date. The first train from Rolvenden to Tenterden carried 312. 78 schoolchildren, along with Sir Myles Fenton, Holman F. Stephens, and other dignitaries. The South Eastern and Chatham Railway, seeking to relieve themselves from building the Tenterden Railway, entered into an agreement with the Rother Valley Railway for the latter to build and operate the line from Tenterden to Headcorn. The South Eastern and Chatham Railway agreed to make up any operating losses in exchange for an option to purchase the line at any time within the next 21 years from the date of opening. The option was not exercised. A wind pump was provided at the Headcorn end of the station. It supplied a water tower located at the Robertsbridge end of the station. In 1904, the Rother Valley Railway changed its name to the Kent and East Sussex Light Railway.

The line from Tenterden to Headcorn Junction opened to traffic on 15 May 1905. A wind pump was provided just outside Headcorn Junction to supply water for the locomotives. In 1904, the Headcorn and Maidstone Junction Light Railway was authorised. This line would have run from Headcorn via Sutton Valence to Tovil, where running powers over part of the Medway Valley Line would have allowed access to Maidstone. Only the section from Tovil to Tovil Goods was ever built. The original junction at Headcorn was on the Ashford side of the station. Headcorn was remodelled by the Southern Railway in 1930 to provide two through roads and the junction was then moved to the Tonbridge side of the station.

On the outbreak of World War I in 1914, the K&ESR came under government control, as did most railways at the time. It was released from government control in 1921, and £1,487 in compensation was paid. The K&ESR was not included in the grouping of the railways into the Big Four in 1923, and continued its independent existence.

=== Grouping and decline ===
By 1924, the section from Tenterden to Headcorn was operating at a loss. Correspondence with the Southern Railway in 1930 led to Sir Herbert Walker stating that there was no chance of the line making a profit, and that even if passenger services were withdrawn, it was doubtful whether the receipts from freight traffic would cover operating expenses. The Southern Railway were liable to make up any operating losses, as the successor to the South Eastern and Chatham Railway under the terms of the agreement for the construction of that section of line.

In 1931, Colonel Stephens died, and the management of the K&ESR came under the control of William Henry Austen, who had been assistant and life-partner to Stephens for a number of years. In 1932, Austen was appointed Official Receiver for the line. He entered into negotiations with the Southern Railway aimed at disposing of worn out stock and obtaining serviceable replacements. One batch of stock disposed of was valued at £855, but realised only £6 10s 0d. In 1935, the K&ESR purchased a 2-ton Bedford LQ lorry, and another was purchased in 1936. In that year, the first of the locomotives hired from the Southern Railway arrived on the line, this was P Class No. 1556. The whole line was relaid with 60 pounds per yard (29.8 kg/m) rails in 1939.

When World War II broke out in 1939, the K&ESR again came under government control, being placed under the Railway Operating Division of the Royal Engineers. Rail mounted guns were stationed at Rolvenden and Wittersham. The line was an alternative supply route to the south coast, and relieved some of the pressure on Ashford. Components for Operation Pluto were conveyed along the line. With the increase in price for scrap metal during the war, most of the line's surplus stock was scrapped. On 1 January 1948, the line became part of Southern Region of British Railways on nationalisation.

=== British Railways ===
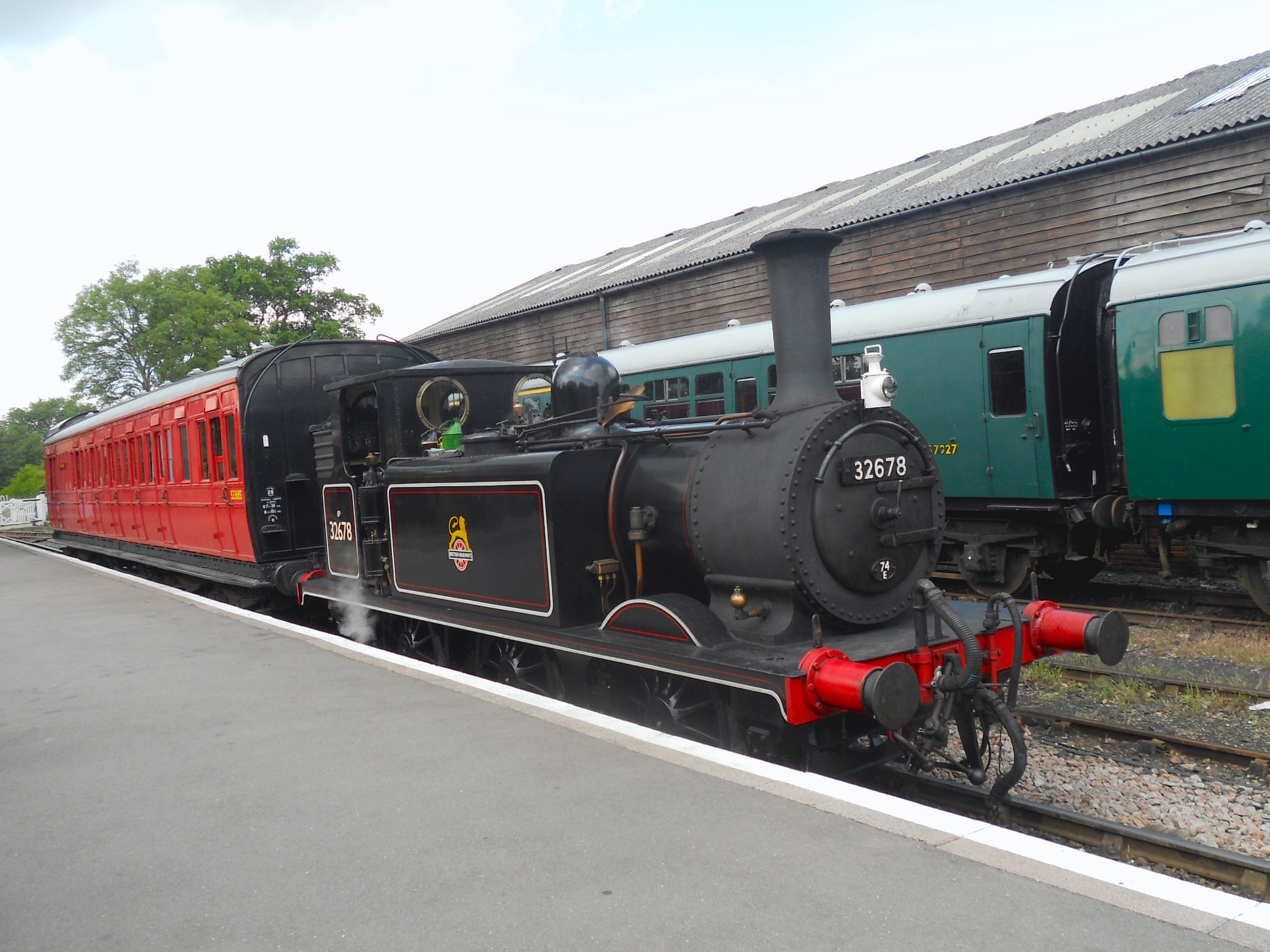
British Railways Class A1X No. 32678 and Birdcage Brake at Tenterden Town recreating a typical branch line train of the early 1950s

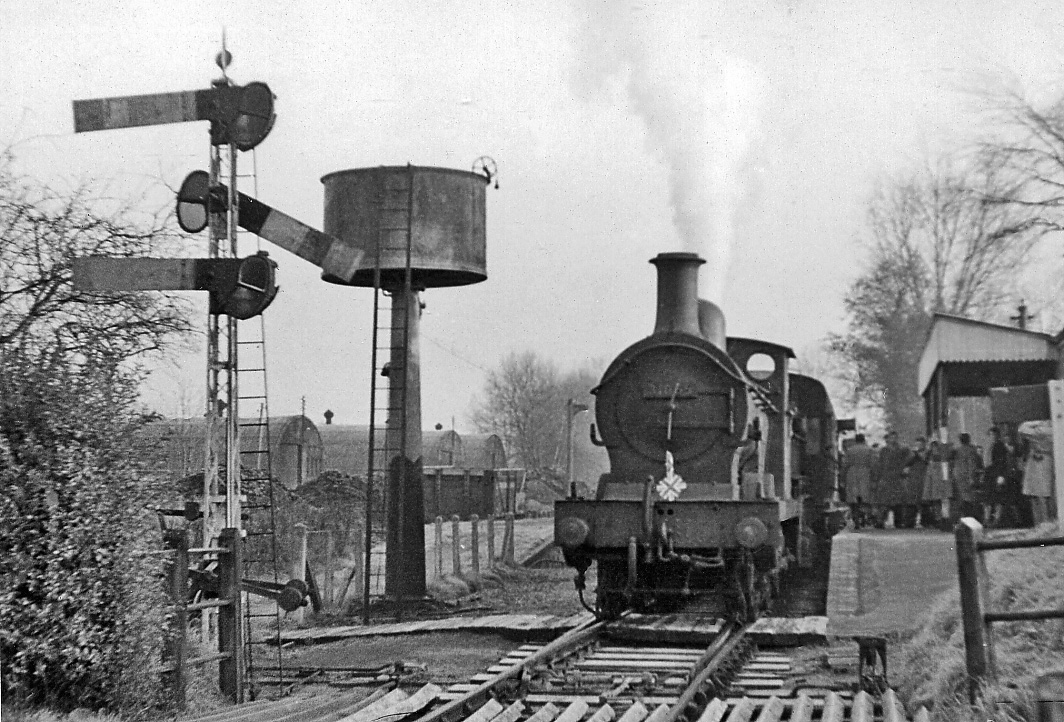
Ex-SE&C class O1 0-6-0 No. 31065 leads the last train at Tenterden station on 2 January 1954

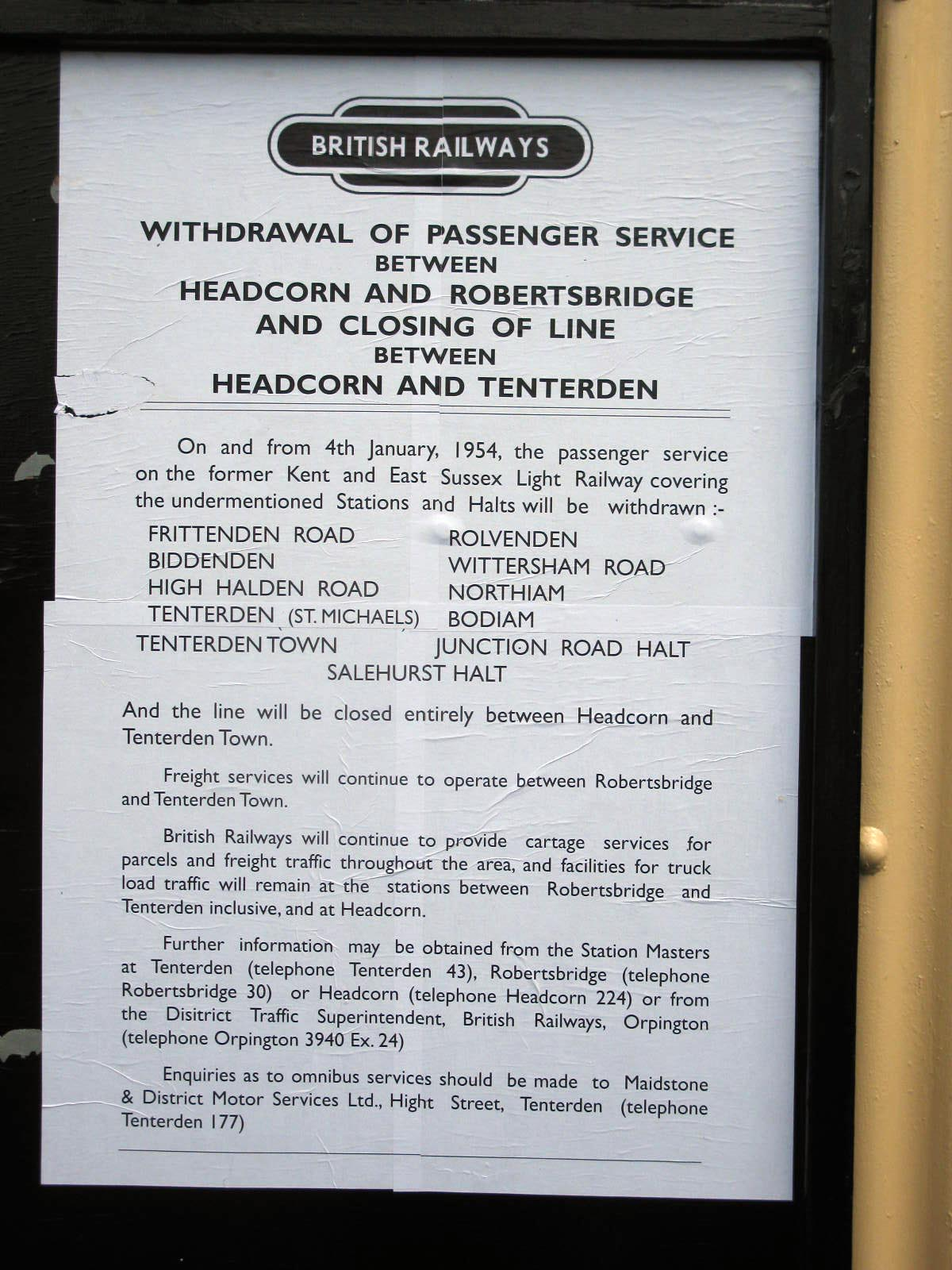
Notice of closure, 1953

Upon nationalisation, one of the surviving two locomotives and all but the newest rolling stock were scrapped. Ex South Eastern and Chatham Railway birdcage carriages were put into service on the line, supplementing the ex London and South Western Railway carriages. Mixed trains continued to run, but were now provided with a brake van. The line continued to be run as two sections. A proposal to double the line wasn't carried out, but the track was again relaid to a higher standard, using rails salvaged from the Elham Valley Railway. All ticket stock was withdrawn and new tickets were printed, and the staffing of stations was increased. That was not accompanied by an increase in passengers, and regular passenger services ceased. The final passenger train ran on 2 January 1954. It was the 5:50 pm from Robertsbridge to Headcorn, composed of six corridor coaches which had been specially brought from Ashford for the occasion. Motive power was Terriers 32655 leading and 32678 at the rear. 32655 was replaced by O1 31065 and 32678 banked the train to St Michael's. The two Terriers then ran back to Robertsbridge with a carriage between them to reduce the weight on the bridges. Double-heading was prohibited between Rolvenden and Robertsbridge.

Two freight trains a day continued to run, with hop-pickers' specials operating until 1958. There was occasional passenger traffic in the form of railtours. In 1957, Drewry diesel locomotive 11220 was successfully trialled on the line, and it and 11223 were the regular locomotives for the final years of operation. In 1958, Hastings Diesel Electric Multiple Unit number 1002 underwent load tests between Bodiam and Northiam – the only time one of these units visited the line prior to the preservation era.

=== Closure ===
The final passenger train over the line before closure was a Locomotive Club of Great Britain railtour on 11 June 1961. The line closed the following day, apart from a short stretch at Robertsbridge serving Hodson's Flour Mill, which became a private siding. This final section of the line closed on 1 January 1970.

=== Operation ===
The Kent and East Sussex Light Railway was operated as two separate sections, Robertsbridge—Tenterden Town and Tenterden Town—Headcorn. The extension to Headcorn had been built with heavier rails than the Robertsbridge—Rolvenden section, and thus had a higher axle loading allowing the use of heavier locomotives. The section between Tenterden Town and Headcorn was largely paralleled by roads, and was open to competition from road transport. Although the Rother Valley Railway and the Kent and East Sussex Light Railway originally ran separate passenger and freight trains, by the 1920s mixed trains were the norm. The first railbus was introduced in 1923. Although these were light and economical to run, they did not provide much in the way of passenger comfort.

Between 1928 and 1933, a through coach was added to the 5:15 pm from Cannon Street to Hastings, which was detached at Robertsbridge and worked on to Tenterden. In the hop-picking season, special trains were run to bring the hop-pickers down from London. One such train in 1936 is recorded as having consisted of four Southern Railway bogie carriages, two K&ESR six-wheeled carriages and a van. The train was hauled by the ex LSWR Saddletank No 4. The K&ESR's own stock was generally confined to that system. The Southern Railway refused permission for some of the K&ESR carriages to be taken to Lydd in 1947 citing safety reasons. The carriages were required for use in the filming of The Loves of Joanna Godden.

Tickets were usually issued on the trains, although the K&ESR did not acquire any corridor carriages until 1944. The tickets were printed at Rolvenden. Tickets for other lines under Colonel Stephens's control were also printed here.

=== Accidents ===
- In 1916, Hesperus was derailed when the locomotive ploughed into a snow drift.
- On 9 January 1929, the Ford railmotor was derailed at Junction Road (for Hawkhurst).
- No 7 was derailed at an unknown date.
- On Saturday 26 March 1949, A1 32678 was derailed between Northiam and the Rother Bridge working the 5:50 pm from Bexhill West. A month passed before 32678 was recovered.
- In May 1983, Manning Wardle 'Charwelton' was derailed between Wittersham Road and Rolvenden causing damage to approximately 100 yards of track and to the locomotive's axle boxes.

== Preservation ==
=== Preservation history ===
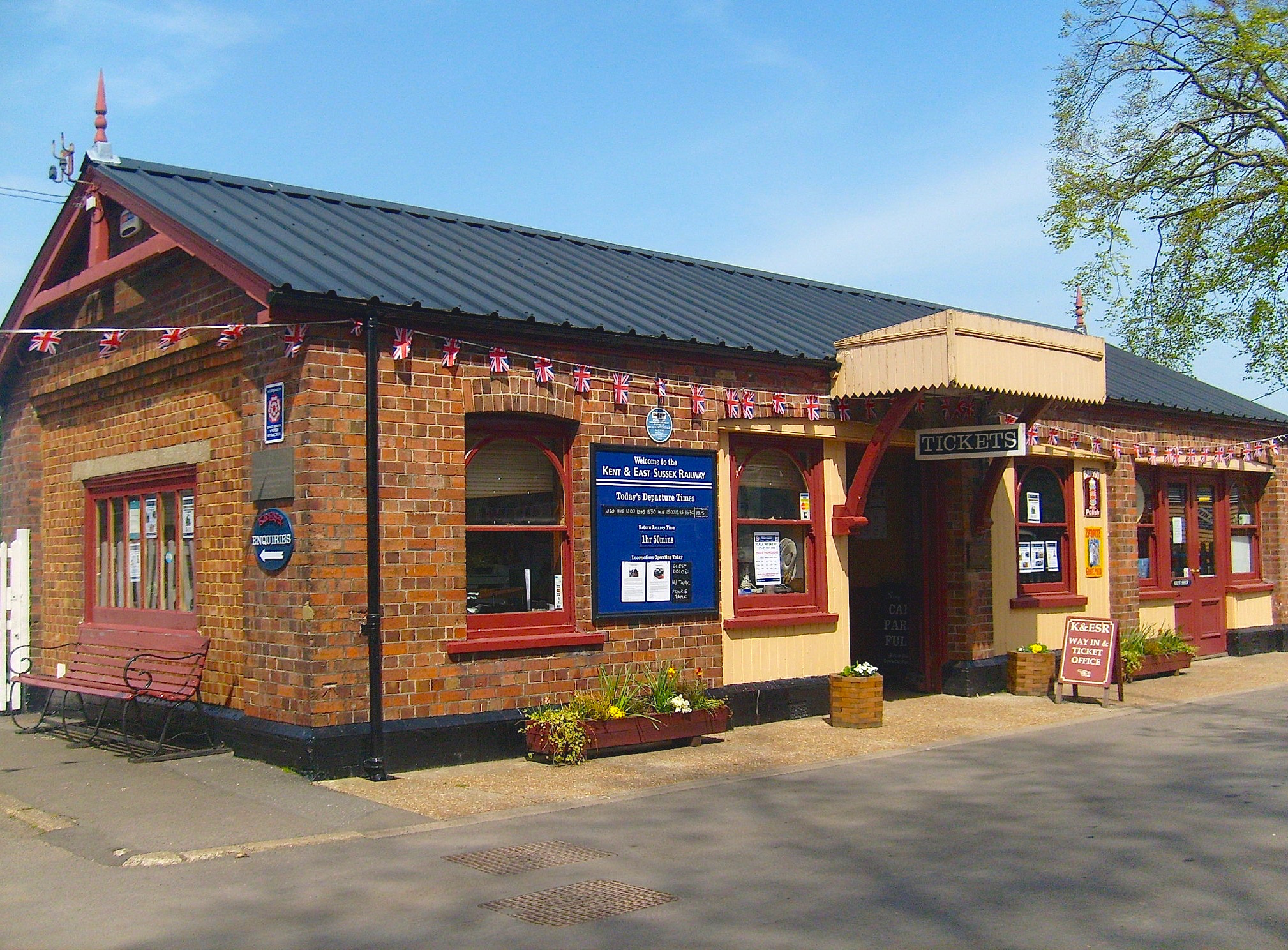
Tenterden Town Station

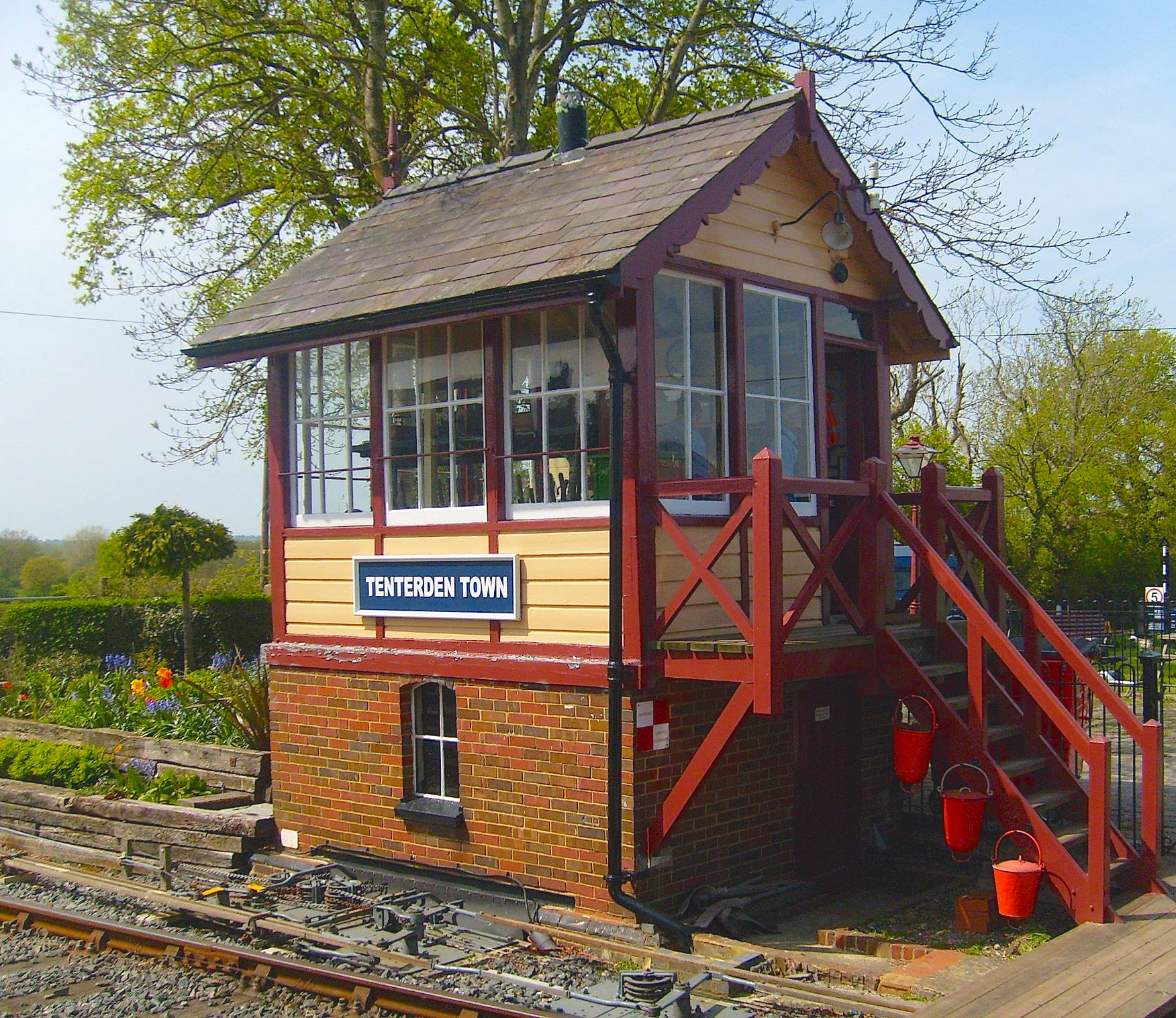
Tenterden Town Signal Box

Preservation activities began immediately. However, due to difficulties in obtaining the necessary Light Railway (Transfer) Order, it was 1974 before the line partially reopened as a heritage steam railway between Tenterden and Rolvenden. Extensions followed, notably to Wittersham Road in 1977 and Northiam in 1990; then to Bodiam in 2000, and an extra one mile (1.6 km) extension to the site of Junction Road halt in 2011.

The preserved railway has had a tempestuous history, with two financial crises and disputes between the volunteer group and their elected board of trustees. In the late 1990s, the company was almost bankrupted but avoided administration due to an error in the bank's loan agreement. The financial position has since improved.

As with most heritage railways, the line has a number of paid employees to secure its continued operation and stages a variety of special events days to boost income.

The railway has suffered from the legacy of Colonel Stephens's cheap and poor construction of the permanent way; thus the preserved railway has sought to update permanent way features, for instance by renewing culverts and embankments.

In 1990, the railway had to remove 200 metres of embankment damaged by badgers. There are some problems of subsidence outside Rolvenden, which often requires speed restrictions to avoid further damage to the line's foundations. Most of the permanent way between Northiam and Bodiam has now been rebuilt to modern standards.

=== The line today ===
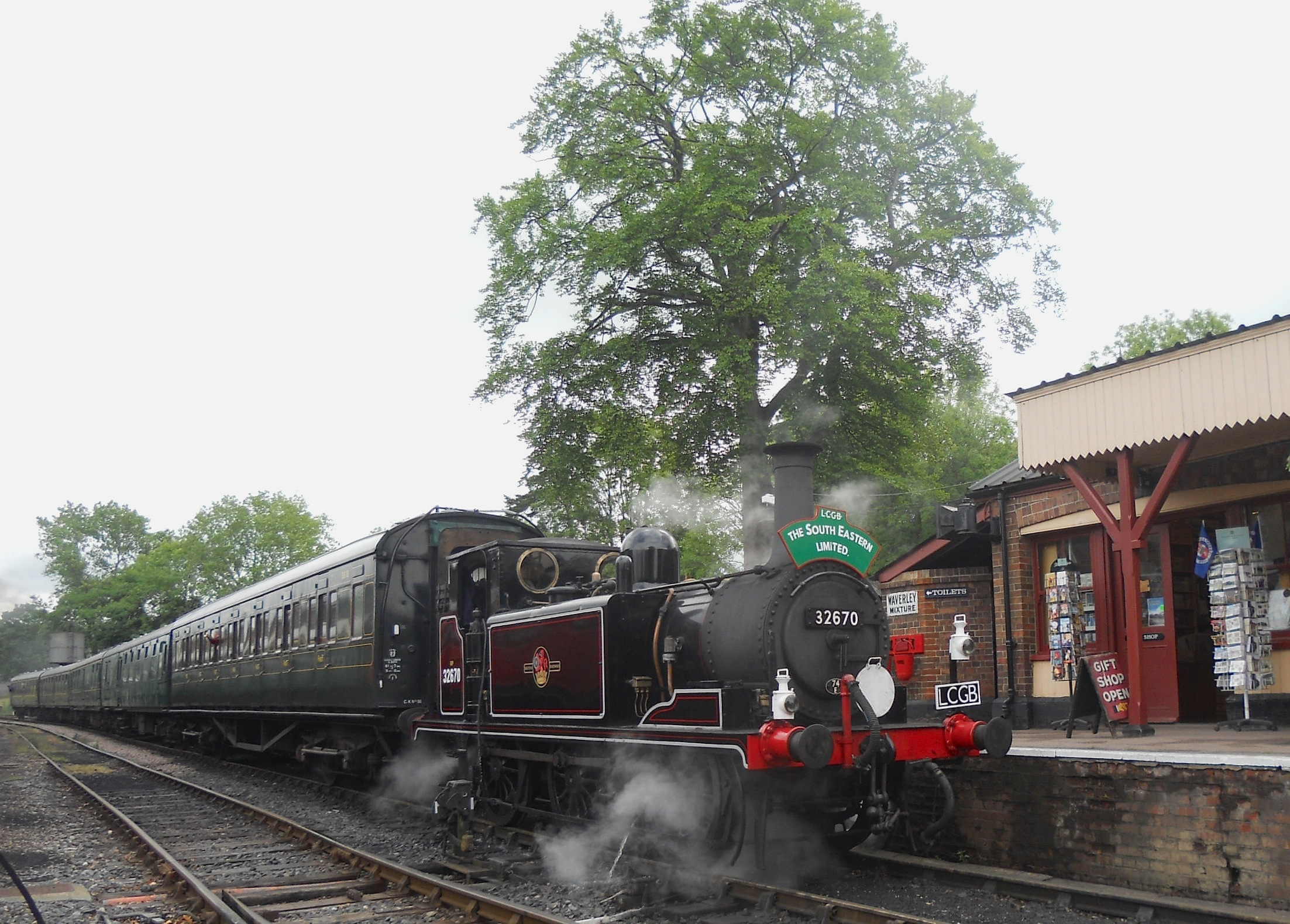
British Railways Class A1X No. 32670 and its train at Tenterden Town

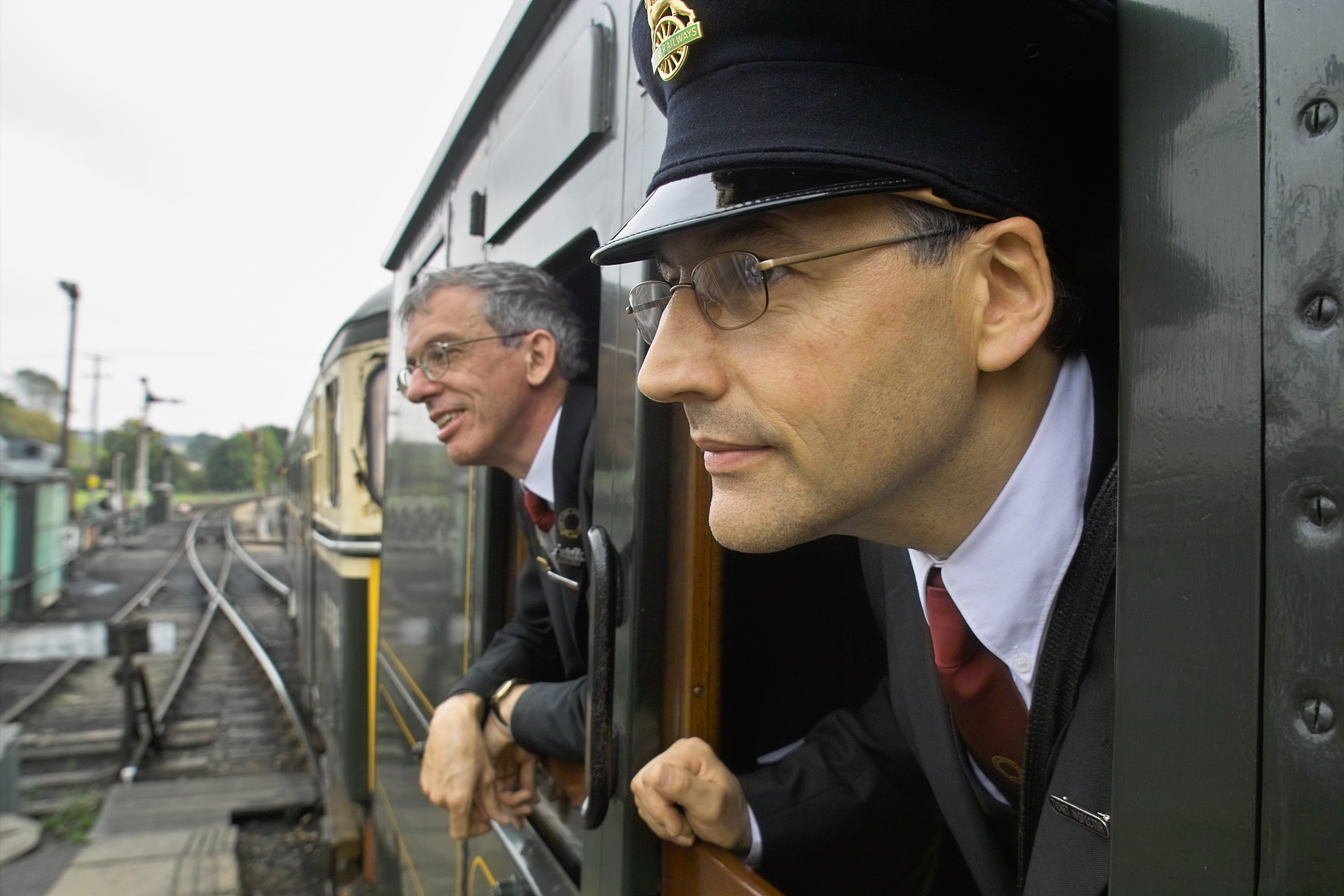
Volunteer staff on the Kent and East Sussex Railway, at Rolvenden station near Tenterden, October 2005

The line today is a tourist attraction in the South East of England. It offers an 11 1/2 miles (18.5 km) ride through the Rother Valley in vintage and British Railways coaches usually hauled by a steam locomotive, although some off-peak services are operated by a diesel multiple unit.

The preserved line currently runs from Tenterden Town station to Bodiam (within sight of the National Trust's Bodiam Castle), with an extra one mile (1.6 km) of track to the Junction Road station site (though there are currently no plans to re-open for alighting).

Tenterden Town station is the main headquarters for the heritage railway, where a book and gift shop can be found, selling Thomas the Tank Engine gifts, the carriage and wagon department and a cafe that was once the Maidstone & District Motor Services bus station building from Maidstone, Kent. The railway emphasises the Colonel Stephens connection as a major factor of its utilitarian heritage. The locomotive works is located at Rolvenden station and has a viewing platform overlooking the works yard and a selection of former inter-modal shipping containers used for equipment storage. Themed events are run through the year. Some are connected with local history and the railway whilst, as on other heritage lines, Thomas and Santa specials provide a commercial underpinning to the company's activities. Railway experience days are also offered.

In 2026, the K&ESR secured a Rural Energy Transition grant of £14,740 from the government’s Rural England Prosperity Fund to help with the cost of installing solar panels at Tenterden Town Station. An array of panels has been installed on the roof of the 2012 extension to the carriage and wagon shed. Their design and location have been selected to ensure that they do not detract from the authenticity and setting of the station buildings themselves.

=== Colonel Stephens Railway Museum ===
Situated at Tenterden is the Colonel Stephens Railway Museum. This houses a number of exhibits including a wax dummy of the colonel, telling the story of the man himself and of his railways. This is a popular exhibit amongst children visiting the museum, many of whom delight in the collection of old railway magazines and timetables.

=== Rother Valley Railway ===
At Robertsbridge, a separate railway preservation effort was set up by the Rother Valley Railway in 1990. It aims to restore track and services east from the main line railway station to Bodiam.

The initial plan was to work towards operating brake van rides on the site, but progress was slow due mainly to lack of funds. However, in 2011 this plan was dropped in favour of moving directly to a final layout suitable to handle the eventual traffic to and from Tenterden, with no interim railway operations. By 2013, much of the new Robertsbridge layout was in place including new track and most of a new full-length station platform. Future developments are to include a carriage shed, loco shed and completion of the station building.

Plans for the missing central part of the route are well advanced, despite being hampered by the A21 trunk road crossing the track bed, the need for some very expensive bridge works and the necessity to purchase the route from landowners. Two landowners remain resistant to selling the necessary agricultural land for railway development, and the plans for a level crossing on the A21 in particular has caused local controversy.

At the beginning of 2009 about 750 yards (690 m) of former track bed was purchased from just west of Bodiam station to within 150 yards (140 m) yards of the site of Junction Road Halt. Work began on restoration and by April of that year the track was laid. In 2010 a further 150yds of track bed was obtained and track was laid to the site of Junction Road Halt adjacent to the B2244 (formerly the A229). The first advertised passenger service over this section ran on the weekend of 19/20 March 2011, although services are currently restricted to occasional gala days only.

By end of 2013, the track had been laid from the newly built platform at Robertsbridge all the way to Northbridge Street over five newly rebuilt bridges, and during 2013 the first steam trains ran along this line since it was closed. In 2012 a plan to reconnect the RVR to the national railway network once more was announced, and this connection opened in 2016.

On 16 March 2017, Rother District Council granted planning permission for the reinstatement of the line between Northbridge Street and Junction Road. An application has been made for a Transport and Works Act order which would give statutory powers to rebuild and operate the line. This awaits a public inquiry.

On 9 May 2023, the Transport and Works act order (TWAO) was granted.

== Rolling stock ==
=== The independent company ===
==== Steam locomotives ====
Owned by the Rother Valley Railway and/or the Kent and East Sussex Light Railway.

Origin	Wheel arrangement	Class	Notes	Photograph
Hawthorn Leslie	2-4-0T		No 1 Tenterden. Works number 2420/1899. Bought new for the opening of the line. Withdrawn for overhaul in 1938, scrapped in 1941.	
Hawthorn Leslie	2-4-0T		No 2 Northiam. Works number 2421/1899. Bought new for the opening of the line. Loaned in 1917 to the Weston, Clevedon and Portishead Railway, returned in 1918. Loaned in 1923 to the East Kent Light Railway, returned in 1930. In 1937, Northiam starred in Oh, Mr Porter!, filmed on the Basingstoke and Alton Light Railway. Last ran on 22 August 1938 and scrapped in 1941.	
London, Brighton and South Coast Railway (LBSC)	0-6-0T	A1 (Terrier)	No 3 Bodiam. Ex LBSC No 70 Poplar. Built in 1872. Purchased secondhand in 1901. Withdrawn in 1931 but returned to service in 1933 using parts cannibalised from No 5 Rolvenden. Appeared in the film The Loves of Joanna Godden, filmed at Lydd in 1947. Rebuilt to A1X in 1943 To British Railways upon nationalisation in 1948. Withdrawn in 1963 and purchased for use on the heritage K&ESR.	
Hawthorn Leslie	0-8-0T		No 4 Hecate. Works number 2587/1904. Purchased new in 1904. Loaned to the East Kent Light Railway from 1917 to 1919 to work at Tilmanstone Colliery. At 53 tons she was too heavy for the lightly laid section from Robertsbridge to Rolvenden and was used occasionally on the northern section. To the Southern Railway in 1932 in exchange for another locomotive and two boilers. Scrapped in 1950.	
London and South Western Railway (LSWR)	0-6-0ST	Saddleback	No 4. Built by Beyer Peacock, Works number 1596/1876. Ex LSWR No 335 and 0335. Obtained in 1932, scrapped in 1948.	
London, Brighton and South Coast Railway	0-6-0T	A1X (Terrier)	No 5 Rolvenden. Ex LBSC No 71 Wapping. Purchased secondhand in 1905. Withdrawn in 1932, cannibalised in 1933 and scrapped in 1938.	
London and South Western Railway	0-6-0	Ilfracombe Goods	No 7 Rother. Ex LSWR No 282, 349 and 0349. Built by Beyer Peacock. Works number 1208/1873. Purchased secondhand in 1910 and scrapped in 1939.	
Manning Wardle	0-6-0ST		No 8 Hesperus. Works number 630/1876. Ex Ringing Rock of the North Pembroke and Fishguard Railway and Great Western Railway No 1380. Purchased secondhand in 1914. Nameplates went to a locomotive on the Hundred of Manhood and Selsey Tramway. Last run on 17 March 1939 and scrapped in 1941.	
London and South Western Railway	0-6-0	Ilfracombe Goods	No 9 Juno. Ex LSWR No 284 and 0284. Built by Beyer Peacock. Works number 1210/1873. Purchased secondhand in 1914. Dismantled in 1935 and scrapped in 1939.	

Note:

The order of scrapping of the locomotives was 7, 5, 6 (steam railcar), 1, 9, 2 and 8.

==== Railcars ====
Owned by the Rother Valley Railway and/or the Kent and East Sussex Light Railway.

Origin	Engine	Notes	Photograph
R Y Pickering, Wishaw	Steam	Purchased new in 1905. Originally numbered 16 in carriage stock list, later renumbered 6 in the locomotive stock list. Saw little service, withdrawn by 1930 and scrapped in 1941.	
Wolseley-Siddeley	Petrol	Built as a Wolseley Siddeley motor car. Fitted with flanged wheels and tested on the Kent and East Sussex Railway. Fitted with a body similar to those used on buses and sent to the Hundred of Manhood and Selsey Tramway and then to the Shropshire and Montgomeryshire Railway. Body later affixed to Gazelle to build an inspection saloon and eventually was turned into a lineside hut on the Shropshire and Montgomeryshire Light Railway.	
Ford	Petrol	A pair of railcars. Purchased in 1923 from Edmonds of Thetford. Bodywork by Eaton Coachworks, Cringleford. Scrapped c. 1934.	
Ford	Petrol	A pair of railcars. Hire purchased in 1924 from Edmonds of Thetford. Bodywork by Eaton Coachworks, Cringleford. Last worked on 27 August 1937 and scrapped in 1941.	
Shefflex Lorries Ltd, Tinsley	Petrol	A pair of railcars, purchased in 1930. Originally numbered 3 but later renumbered 2. Last ran on 8 March 1938 and scrapped in 1941.	

==== Hired or loaned locomotives ====
Hired or loaned to the Kent and East Sussex Light Railway.

Origin	Wheel arrangement	Class	Notes	Photograph
London and South Western Railway (LSWR)	0-6-0ST	0330	Ex LSWR No 0127. Purchased by the East Kent Light Railway in 1926. Delivered to Rolvenden and used on the line before delivery to the East Kent Light Railway.	
London and South Western Railway (LSWR)	0-6-0ST	0330	Southern Railway No 3334 loaned to the Kent and East Sussex Light Railway in 1938 when No 4 was sent to Ashford Works for repairs.	
South Eastern and Chatham Railway	0-6-0T	P	Southern Railway No. 1556 was loaned to the Kent and East Sussex Light Railway from 1938 to 1938, No. 1325 was loaned in 1946 and No. 1555 was loaned in 1947.	
London, Brighton and South Coast Railway	0-6-0T	A1X (Terrier)	Southern Railway No. 2655 was loaned from 1939 to 1945, 2678 was loaned in 1940. Nos. 2640 and 2659 were loaned to the Kent and East Sussex Light Railway at various dates between 1936 and 1947.	
London and South Western Railway	0-6-0	0395	Southern Railway No 3440 was loaned to the Kent and East Sussex Light Railway in 1940.	
South Eastern and Chatham Railway	0-6-0	O1	Southern Railway No. 1426 was loaned to the Kent and East Sussex Light Railway in 1943. Nos. 1248, 1370 and 1373 were loaned to the Kent and East Sussex railway at various dates between 1936 and 1947.	
Great Western Railway	0-6-0	Dean Goods	War Department Nos WD195, WD196 and WD197 were used on the Kent and East Sussex Light Railway between 1941 and 1943 when rail mounted rocket guns were stationed at Rolvenden and Wittersham.	

==== Passenger stock ====
Owned by the Rother Valley Railway and/or the Kent and East Sussex Light Railway.

Origin	Number	Type	Notes	Photograph
Hurst Nelson Ltd	1 to 4	4-wheel third	Four third-class four-wheel carriages were purchased new in 1901 for the opening of the line. Bodies used to create bogie carriages in 1906.	
Hurst Nelson Ltd	5, 6	4-wheel first	Two first-class four-wheel carriages were purchased new in 1901 for the opening of the line. Bodies used to create bogie carriages in 1906.	
R Y Pickering	1	Brake third	Built in 1906 using the bodies of two of the Hurst Nelson carriages on a new underframe. Scrapped in 1948.	
R Y Pickering	4	Brake composite	Built in 1906 using the bodies of two of the Hurst Nelson carriages on a new underframe. Scrapped in 1948.	
R Y Pickering	6	Third	Built in 1906 using the bodies of two of the Hurst Nelson carriages on a new underframe. Sold for scrap on 25 May 1944.	
Great Eastern Railway		4-wheel brake third.	Purchased secondhand in 1901. Two compartments plus brake. May have carried No. 2. Duckets later removed and used as a full brake at some point, with handles removed from the doors to the passenger compartments.	
Great Eastern Railway		4-wheel brake third	Purchased secondhand in 1901. Three compartments plus brake. May have carried No. 3. Thought to have become No. 17 on the Shropshire & Montgomeryshire Light Railway in the early 1920s.	
Great Eastern Railway		4-wheel first	Purchased secondhand in 1901. Four compartments. May have carried No. 5.	
Hurst Nelson	7, 8	4-wheel brake	Supplied new in 1901 for the opening of the line. Could be used on either passenger or freight trains.	
London and South Western Railway	9	6-wheel brake third	Purchased secondhand in 1905. Scrapped in the 1930s.	
London and South Western Railway	10	4-wheel saloon	Built in 1848 by the London and South Western railway for Queen Victoria. Exhibited at The Great Exhibition of 1851, Hyde Park. Used as a director's saloon and later as a first class carriage. Sold to the Southern Railway in 1936. Body sold for use as a summerhouse and survived until 1964.	
North London Railway	? and 15	4-wheel brake	Purchased secondhand by 1906. One probably carried a number between 11 and 14. No 15 was scrapped in 1948.	
R Y Pickering	17	Brake composite	Purchased new in 1904, seated 46. Used at the opening of the East Kent Light Railway in 1912 and inaugurated passenger services on that line in 1916. Scrapped in 1948.	
R Y Pickering	18	Third	Purchased new in 1904, seated 48. Sold in 1909 to the Woolmer Instructional Military Railway, where it lasted until 1940.	
Robert Young Pickering	19	Brake third	Purchased new in 1904, seated 32. Sold in 1909 to the Woolmer Instructional Military Railway, where it lasted until 1940.	
	17		Sold for scrap on 25 May 1944.	
London and South Western Railway	18	4-wheel third	Purchased secondhand in 1909. May have been a brake vehicle.	
London and South Western Railway	19	4-wheel brake third	Purchased secondhand in 1909. Scrapped in 1948.	
Great Eastern Railway	20	4-wheel brake third	Purchased secondhand in 1906. Two compartment brake third. Still in regular use in the 1930s. Body later used as a shed on a farm, where it survived until 1964.	
Great Eastern Railway	21	4-wheel brake third	Purchased secondhand in 1906. Three compartment brake third. Still in regular use in the 1930s. Body later used as a shed on a farm, where it survived until 1964.	
Great Eastern Railway	22	4-wheel compsosite.	Purchased secondhand in 1906. Built as a first class carriage. Still in regular use in the 1930s.	
Southern Railway	2	Brake third	Purchased secondhand in 1932. Built by the London and South Western Railway in 1892 as No. 962, a 42 feet (12.80 m) long seven compartment third. Converted c1909 to a five compartment brake third. Renumbered 1934 in 1912 and again renumbered 2640 in 1923. Scrapped in 1941.	
Southern Railway	3	Brake composite	Purchased secondhand in 1932. Built by the London and South Western Railway in 1892 as a 45 feet (13.72 m)} tri-composite numbered 486. converted in 1909 to a brake composite. Renumbered 3550 in 1912 and again renumbered to 6413 in 1923. Scrapped in 1948.	
Southern Railway	4	Brake third	Acquired in 1936. Built by the London and South Western Railway Ex Southern Railway No. 2684. Scrapped in 1948.	
Southern Railway	5	Brake third	Acquired in 1936. Built by the London and South Western Railway. Ex Southern Railway No. 2714. Scrapped in 1948.	
Southern Railway	1	Corridor brake third.	Acquired during the Second World War. Built by London and South Western Railway. To British Railways on nationalisation and remained in service on the line.	
Southern Railway	6	Corridor brake third	Acquired during the Second World War. Built by London and South Western Railway. To British Railways on nationalisation and remained in service on the line.	
Southern Railway	2	Corridor brake third	Acquired in 1947. Built by London and South Western Railway. To British Railways on nationalisation and remained in service on the line.	

==== Freight stock ====
Owned by the Rother Valley Railway and/or the Kent and East Sussex Light Railway.

Origin	Number	Type	Notes	Photograph
Hurst Nelson Ltd	1 to 10	Open wagon	Ten open wagons were purchased new from Hurst Nelson. Further wagons were hired from Hurst Nelson between 1911 and 1919. Some of the original ten wagons were hired to the Shropshire & Montgomeryshire Light Railway between 1927 and 1929. Wagons 1 to 6 had been scrapped by 1940, and only two of the other four were still existing in 1946. Other open wagons were acquired second-hand from the Southern Railway. These had curved ends.	
	12, also 4 with numbers unknown	Cattle wagon	Four cattle wagons were purchased in 1904, and another was purchased in 1928. Three of the five were scrapped in 1935, and a fourth, No. 12 was scrapped in 1944. The fifth passed to British Railways on nationalisation.	
Great Western Railway	24	Brake van	In 1906, the K&ESR purchased a Great Western Railway brake van which reputedly dated from 1877. It was scrapped in 1944.	
Midland Railway		6-wheel hand-operated crane	An 1877-built six-wheel hand-operated crane and match truck were purchased c1919.	
	RVR No 1	4-wheel hand-operated crane	In 1904, a 4-wheel hand-operated crane was purchased from R Y Pickering and delivered numbered R.V.R No. 1. An open wagon was converted to form the match truck for this vehicle.	

==== Non-rail vehicles ====
The K&ESR owned a number of non-rail vehicles, one of which survives today.

- Horse-drawn omnibus - built in 1902 by W J Mercer, Tenterden Carriage Works. Operated under contract by William Hook & Son until the firm ceased trading in 1916. Then operated by the K&ESR until withdrawn in 1924 and stored. Became British Railways property on nationalisation. Now an exhibit at the National Railway Museum, York.
- Horse-drawn van and two drays. The K&ESR acquired a horse-drawn van and two drays in 1916. These were withdrawn in the mid-1930s.
- 2 2-ton Bedford LQ Lorries. One was purchased in 1935 and the second hire purchased in 1936, replacing the horse-drawn vehicles. Both vehicles passed to British Railways on nationalisation.

=== British Railways ===
These locomotives worked on the line between 1948 and 1961.

Origin	Wheel arrangement	Class	Notes	Photograph
London, Brighton and South Coast Railway	0-6-0T	A1 (Terrier)	No. DS 680	
London, Brighton and South Coast Railway	0-6-0T	A1X (Terrier)	Nos. DS377, 32636, 32640, 32641, 32644, 32655, 32659, 32662, 32670 and 32678.	
South Eastern and Chatham Railway	0-6-0	O1	Nos. 31048, 31064, 31065, 31370, 31390 and 31434	
London and South Western Railway	0-6-0	0395	No. 30576	
British Railways	0-6-0DM	04	Nos. 11220 and 11223.	

== Twinning ==
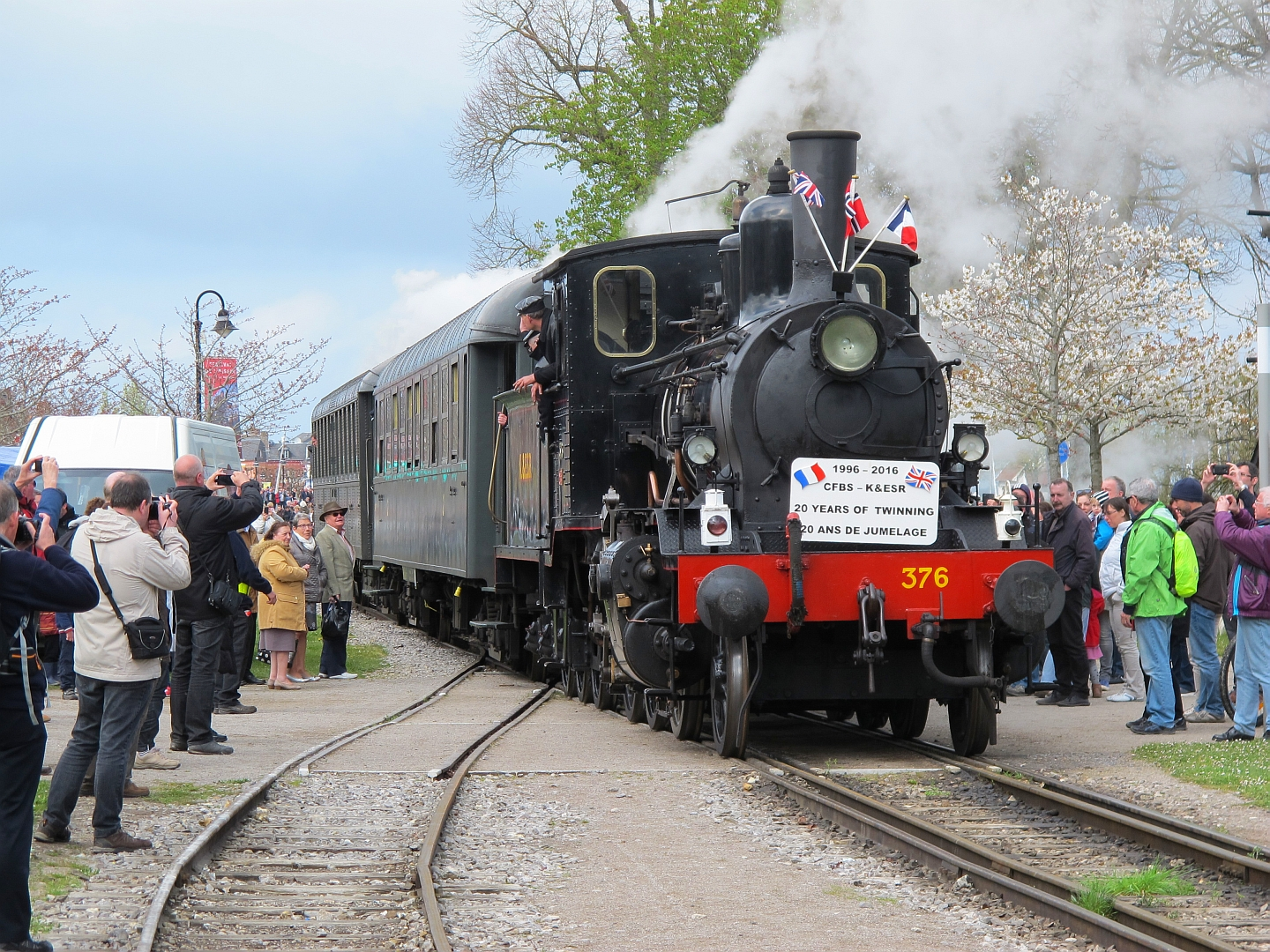
Twentieth anniversary of the twinning on the CFBS, April 2016.

The Kent & East Sussex Railway is twinned with the Chemin de Fer de la Baie de Somme, a preserved railway in France. K&ESR locomotives have made visits to the CFBS.

== Culture and media ==
In the 1924 book A Parcel of Kent by F J Harvey Darton, the railway described is clearly based on the Kent & East Sussex Railway. The railway also appears in the 1940 book Ember Lane by Sheila Kaye-Smith, where it is titled the Sussex Border Railway. The Kent & East Sussex Railway is the subject of the poem Farmer's Train by Hugh Bevan, illustrated by Rowland Emett, and published in Punch issue dated 3 June 1946.

== See also ==
- Colonel Stephens's Railways

== Sources ==
- Garrett, S R (March 1980). The Kent & East Sussex Railway (Revised ed.). Tarrant Hinton: The Oakwood Press.
