= 302 class =

302 class or Class 302 may refer to:

- British Rail Class 302, electric multiple units
- GWR 302 Class, 0-6-0ST steam locomotives
- LSWR 302 class, 0-6-0 steam locomotives
