= Robertsbridge railway station =

Railway station in East Sussex, England

Coordinates: 50.985°N 0.469°E

Robertsbridge
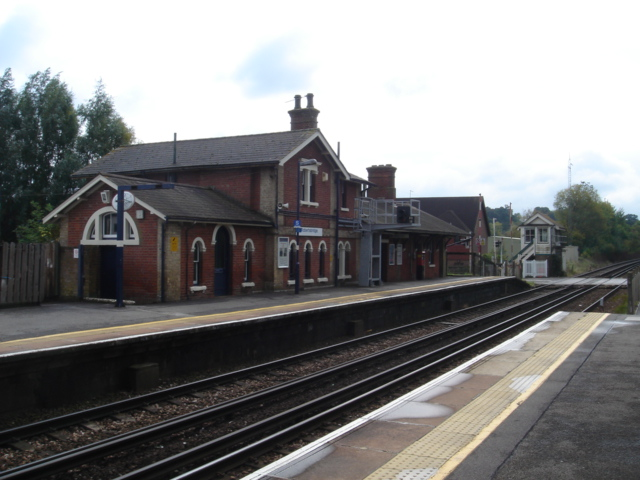
- The station in 2007

General information
- Location: Robertsbridge, Rother; England
- Grid reference: TQ733235
- Manager: Southeastern
- Platforms: 2

Other information
- Station code: RBR
- Classification: DfT category E

Key dates
- 1 September 1851: Opened

Passengers
- 2020/21: ▼75,452
- 2021/22: ▲0.214 million
- 2022/23: ▲0.226 million
- 2023/24: ▲0.239 million
- 2024/25: ▲0.274 million
Location
Notes
- Passenger statistics from the Office of Rail and Road

Robertsbridge railway station is on the Hastings line in the south of England and serves the village of Robertsbridge, East Sussex. It is 49 miles 47 chains (79.8 km) down the line from London Charing Cross. The station and all trains serving it are operated by Southeastern.

== History ==
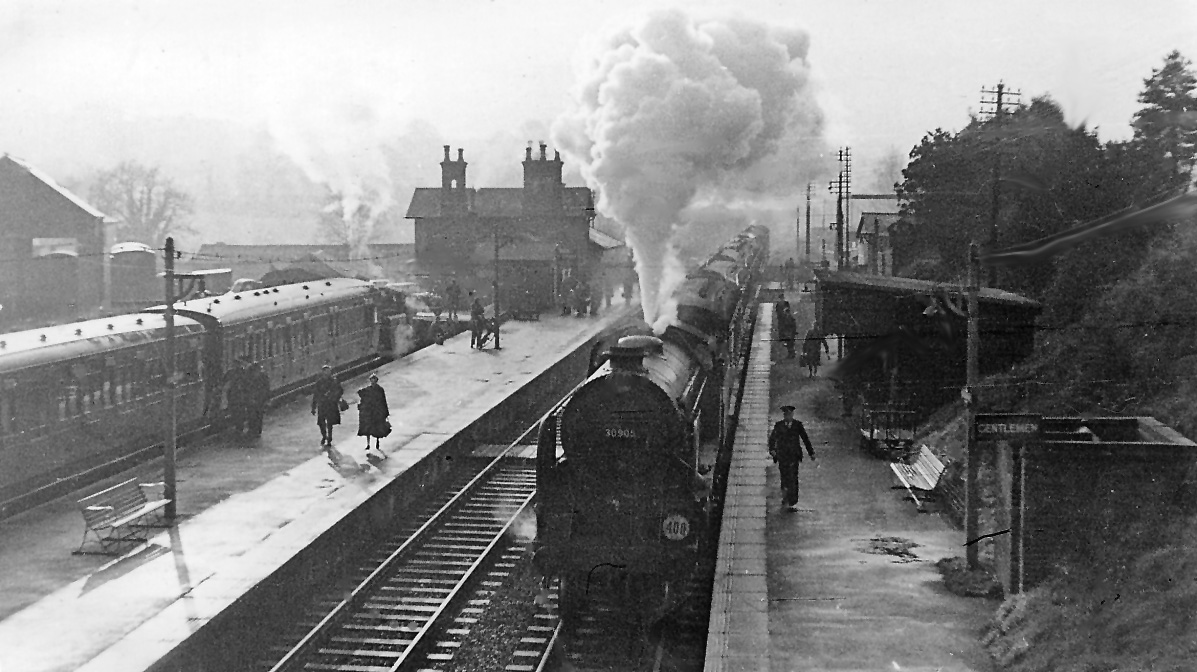
View southward, towards Hastings in 1954

Robertsbridge was temporarily the terminus of the South Eastern Railway's (SER) "Hastings Line" from Tunbridge Wells. This section was opened on 1 September 1851, with the 5.99 mile (9.64 km) stretch to Battle following four months later. A connection was then made with the existing route to Hastings on 1 February 1852; the line connecting St Leonards (West Marina) with Hastings having been opened by the SER on 13 February 1851, and which initially gave the Brighton, Lewes and Hastings Railway access to the latter town. A large station building was provided on the Down side, along with a signal box at the south end of the Down platform.

Robertsbridge became a junction in 1900 with the opening of the Rother Valley Light Railway to Tenterden. The line was extended to Headcorn in 1905, and was renamed the Kent and East Sussex Railway. In 1954 all regular passenger services were withdrawn and the line beyond Tenterden Town was completely closed. The line to Tenterden continued to be used by freight services and occasional special passenger trains (e.g. hop pickers' trains) until closed by British Railways on 12 June 1961. About half a mile of line remained in use as a siding to serve Hodson's Mill on the outskirts of Robertsbridge until 1970. The bay platform, on the Down (eastern) side of the station, is still in place and used for engineers' trains. A railway preservation society, the Rother Valley Railway, have built a new separate station named Robertsbridge Junction on the east side of the car park, and have rebuilt the line from here to Northbridge Street. The first train on this rebuilt section ran in September 2013. They have plans to rebuild the rest of the route eastwards to join up with the Kent and East Sussex Railway and restore services along the line. (Steam trains already run on another section of the line, between Tenterden Town and Bodiam, 3½ miles from Robertsbridge.)

== Services ==
All services at Robertsbridge are operated by Southeastern using Class 375 EMUs.

The typical off-peak service in trains per hour is:

- 1 tph to London Charing Cross
- 1 tph to Hastings

Additional services, including trains to and from and London Cannon Street and Ore call at the station in the peak hours.

Preceding station	National Rail	Following station
Etchingham	Southeastern Hastings Line	Battle
	Disused railways	
Salehurst Halt	British Rail Southern Region Kent and East Sussex Railway	Terminus
Etchingham	Southern Railway Hastings Line	Mountfield Halt
