= William George Beattie =

William George Beattie (2 December 1841 – 28 May 1918) was an English locomotive engineer. He was born in Lambeth, London the son of Joseph Hamilton Beattie. He joined the London and South Western Railway in 1862 as a draughtsman at Nine Elms Locomotive Works. He succeeded his father as Locomotive Engineer of the LSWR following Joseph's death in 1871. He was not however a success in this post and was forced to resign in 1878.

== Locomotive classes ==
W.G. Beattie perpetuated five of his father's designs, but with modifications. He also introduced five classes of his own design.

Locomotive classes designed by W.G. Beattie
Class	Wheel arrangement	Driving wheels	Years built	Builders	Quantity	Purpose	Notes
298	2-4-0WT	5 ft 6 in (1.7 m)	1872–75	Beyer, Peacock (12); Nine Elms (3)	15	Suburban passenger	Modified J.H. Beattie design
Lion	0-6-0	5 ft 0 in (1.5 m)	1872–73	Nine Elms	6	Goods	Modified J.H. Beattie design
Volcano	2-4-0	6 ft 0 in (1.8 m)	1872–73	Nine Elms	6	Passenger	Modified J.H. Beattie design
282	0-6-0	4 ft 6 1/2 in (1.4 m)	1873–80	Beyer, Peacock	8	Goods	
273	0-6-0	5 ft 1 in (1.5 m)	1873	Beyer, Peacock	6	Goods	Modified J.H. Beattie design
Vesuvius	2-4-0	6 ft 6 in (2.0 m)	1873–75	Nine Elms	18	Passenger	Modified J.H. Beattie design
302	0-6-0	5 ft 1 in (1.5 m)	1874–78	Beyer, Peacock	36	Goods	
318	4-4-0T	5 ft 9 in (1.8 m)	1875	Beyer, Peacock	6	Passenger	
330	0-6-0ST	4 ft 1 in (1.2 m)	1876–82	Beyer, Peacock	20	Shunting	
348	4-4-0	6 ft 6 in (2.0 m)	1877	Sharp, Stewart	20	Passenger	

Business positions
Preceded by Joseph Hamilton Beattie	Locomotive Superintendent of the London and South Western Railway; 1871–1878	Succeeded by William Adams
