= LSWR 330 class =

Class of British steam locomotive

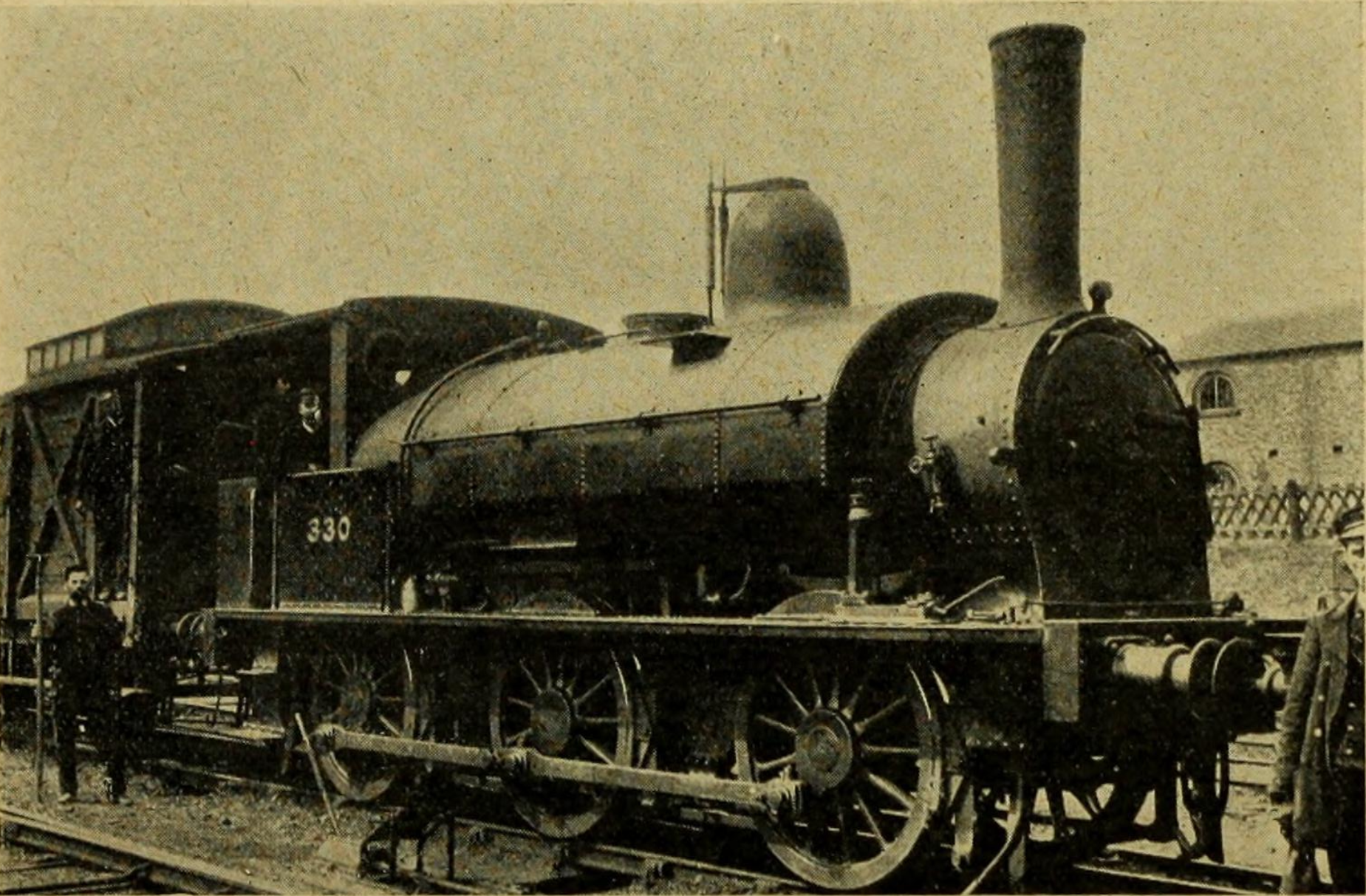
Type and origin
- Power type: Steam
- Builder: Beyer, Peacock and Company
- Serial number: BP 1591–1596, 1698–1699, 2125–2136
- Build date: 1876 (6), 1877 (2), 1882 (12)
- Total produced: 20
Specifications
- Configuration
  - Whyte: 0-6-0ST
  - UIC: Cnt
- Gauge: 4 ft 8 1/2 in (1,435 mm)
- Driver dia.: 4 ft 3 in (1.295 m)
- Length: 27 ft 1 1/2 in (8.27 m)
- Height: 13 ft 2 in (4.01 m)
- Axle load: 12.00 long tons (12.2 t)
- Adhesive weight: 37.60 long tons (38.2 t)
- Loco weight: 34.975 long tons (35.5 t)
- Fuel type: Coal
- Water cap.: 800 imp gal (3,600 L; 960 US gal)
- Boiler pressure: 150 psi (1.03 MPa)
- Cylinders: Two, inside
- Cylinder size: 17 in × 24 in (432 mm × 610 mm)
Performance figures
- Tractive effort: 17,340 lbf (77.1 kN)
Career
- Operators: LSWR · SR
- Class: 330
- Power class: LSWR / SR: not classified
- Number in class: 1 January 1923: 20
- Nicknames: Saddlebacks
- Withdrawn: 1924–1933
- Disposition: All scrapped

The LSWR 330 class or Saddlebacks was a class of goods 0-6-0ST steam locomotives designed for the London and South Western Railway. Twenty were constructed by Beyer, Peacock and Company between 1876 and 1882.

William George Beattie ordered the first six of the Beyer, Peacock-designed 330 class in October 1875. Intended for shunting work, prior to their arrival the LSWR had relegated old locomotives to shunting duties, a task they were unsuitable for and frequently caused delays. Delivered in May 1876, the success of these in the yards near Nine Elms led to two more being ordered the following January, which were delivered in June 1877. Beattie resigned in early 1878, and his successor, William Adams, later ordered twelve more which were delivered in May–June 1882.

While the first six and last six members of the class were numbered in blocks of new numbers from 330 to 335 and 409 to 414, the eight locomotives built in between these re-used numbers of withdrawn or duplicated locomotives.

Table of locomotive orders
Year	Builder	Quantity	LSWR Numbers	Notes
1876	Beyer, Peacock & Co. 1591–1596	6	330–335	
1877	Beyer, Peacock & Co. 1698–1699	2	227–228	Renumbered 316 and 328 in 1899
1883	Beyer, Peacock & Co. 2125–2136	12	127–128, 131, 149–150, 161, 409–414	

Whilst the first six were sent to Nine Elms depot when new, no. 332 was tried out at various locations on the LSWR during 1876. The two built in 1877 went to Northam (Southampton), and later deliveries were used elsewhere on the LSWR system. By 1885 there were nine at Nine Elms; three each at Exeter and Northam; two at Basingstoke and one each at Dorchester, Guildford and Salisbury.

In order to release their numbers for new Adams O2 class locomotives, two locomotives, nos. 227 and 228, were renumbered into the duplicate list by prefixing their existing number with a "0" in 1894, becoming 0227 and 0228. They were returned to the capital list in 1899, by renumbering them 316 and 328. The other eighteen were transferred to the duplicate list between 1902 and 1911; finally, 316 and 328 went back on the duplicate list in 1912 and 1911 respectively, becoming 0316 and 0328.

All passed to the Southern Railway at the grouping in 1923. Withdrawals started the following year, and by the end of 1930 only five remained. Numbers 0128 and 0423 were withdrawn in 1931, 0335 was sold to Kent and East Sussex Railway in 1932, and 0332 and 0334 were withdrawn by the Southern Railway in 1933, after 57 years of service. All were scrapped, with K&ESR No. 4 (ex 0335) lasting until 1948.

Table of withdrawals
Year	Quantity in service at start of year	Quantity withdrawn	Locomotive numbers	Notes
1924	20	4	0131, 0330, 0409, 0414	
1925	16	2	E0127, E0412	E0127 sold to East Kent Light Railway
1926	14	1	E0161	
1927	13	1	E0411	
1929	12	3	E0150, E0328, E0333	
1930	9	4	E0149, E0316, E0331, E0410	
1931	5	2	3128, 3413	
1932	3	1	3335	sold to Kent and East Sussex Railway
1933	2	2	3332, 3334	

== Bibliography ==
- Bradley, D.L. (1965). Locomotives of the L.S.W.R.: Part 1. Kenilworth: RCTS. ISBN 0-901115-08-8.
- Garrett, Stephen R. (1972). The Kent & East Sussex Railway. Tarrant Hinton: The Oakwood Press. ISBN 9780853611004.
- Russell, J. H (1991). A pictorial record of Southern locomotives. Haynes. ISBN 9780860934431. OCLC 60084499.
