= LSWR 348 class =

Class of British steam locomotive

Type and origin
- Power type: Steam
- Designer: William George Beattie
- Builder: Sharp, Stewart and Company
- Serial number: 2657–2676
- Build date: 1877
- Total produced: 20
Specifications
- Configuration
  - Whyte: 4-4-0
- Gauge: 4 ft 8 1/2 in (1,435 mm)
- Leading dia.: 3 ft 3 in (0.991 m)
- Driver dia.: 6 ft 6 in (1.981 m)
- Loco weight: 43.8 long tons (44.5 t)
- Fuel type: Coal
- Water cap.: 2,250 imp gal (10,200 L; 2,700 US gal)
- Boiler pressure: 140 psi (0.97 MPa)
- Cylinders: Two, outside
- Cylinder size: 18 1/2 in × 26 in (470 mm × 660 mm)
Career
- Operators: LSWR
- Class: 348
- Withdrawn: 1889–1905
- Disposition: All scrapped

The LSWR 348 class was a class of passenger 4-4-0 steam locomotives designed by W. G. Beattie to replace his father's 2-4-0 classes on the Salisbury-Exeter expresses of the London and South Western Railway. The class proved to be an abject failure, resulting in W.G. Beattie's early retirement in December 1877.

== Design and construction ==
This was the only original design by William G. Beattie, as the other locomotives delivered during his period as locomotive superintendent were either built to his father's designs or else from the drawing boards of the manufacturers. The design incorporated several new features including Beattie's own design of divided firebox and piston valves. They were also built with continuous splashers on each side similar to a side tank, thereby creating a rather ungainly appearance.

William Beattie was required to supply a larger locomotive type when it became clear to the Directors of the railway that the existing 2-4-0 designs were no longer able to keep time on the difficult main line route between Salisbury and Exeter. Five locomotive builders were approached, but of these one refused to tender and two others suggested major modifications to the design. No prototype of the design was constructed, but twenty examples were ordered from Sharp, Stewart and Company in June 1876, directly from the drawing board. These were numbered 348 to 367.

== Performance issues ==
As soon as the locomotives were delivered between March and June 1877, they were found to lack the capacity to raise sufficient steam, were unsteady at speed, and suffered from frequent mechanical failures. Beattie claimed that these were due to poor standards of workmanship and materials used in their construction, but the manufacturers reported to the directors that the problems were rather due to design flaws. These included a badly designed firebox, providing an inadequate heating surface for the cylinder size, poor smokebox design creating an inadequate draft, badly designed and inadequately lubricated piston valves, and insufficient cushioning of the bogies. According to C. Hamilton Ellis, the class were ‘unfortunate engines. They were over-cylindered and the piston valves with which they were originally fitted gave constant trouble’, also that they ‘were bad steamers.’ Beattie attempted to fix these defects at Nine Elms works but by December 1877 only 4 of the 20 new locomotives were serviceable. The directors therefore accepted William Beattie's resignation on health grounds.

== Adams' improvements ==
William Adams, William Beattie's successor as Locomotive Superintendent, attempted to improve the class's performance in 1878 by adding smaller cylinders, slide valves, a smaller chimney, a conventional firebox and a modified smokebox. The opportunity was also taken to divide the splashers on each side to improve their appearance. Four locomotives were thus treated which performed much better, ‘but the vagaries of the new express engines were such that they did very little main-line work and a number of them were afterwards sent down to Portsmouth for use on the slower trains.’

Despite their use on lighter and slower trains, the repair bills for the class continued to be unacceptably high and so Adams decided to rebuild the entire class using new cylinders and his ’Jubilee’ class boiler. Eight of the class were rebuilt in 1888 and 1889 but this programme ceased when it was found to be more cost-effective to build new ‘Jubilee’ locomotives. The un-rebuilt locomotives were withdrawn and scrapped between 1889 and 1898, and those that had been rebuilt between 1890 and 1905. The boilers from the latter group were salvaged and re-used on ’Jubilee’ class, and T1 class locomotives.
