= LSWR 273 class =

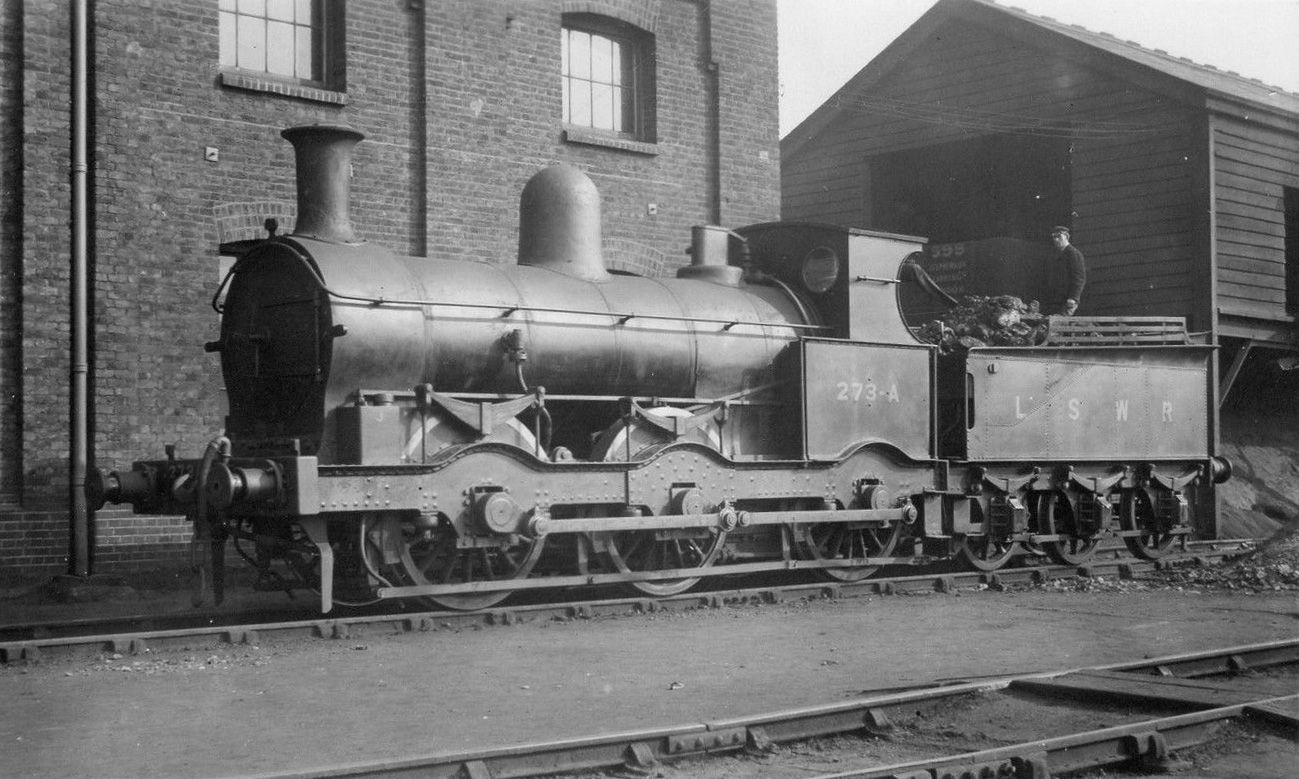
Type and origin
- Power type: Steam
- Designer: William George Beattie
- Builder: Beyer, Peacock & Co.
- Serial number: 1163–1168, 1269–1274
- Build date: 1872–1873
- Total produced: 12
Specifications
- Configuration
  - Whyte: 0-6-0
  - UIC: C n2
- Gauge: 4 ft 8 1/2 in (1,435 mm)
- Driver dia.: 5 ft 1 in (1.549 m)
- Loco weight: 36.45 long tons (37.0 t)
- Fuel type: Coal
- Boiler pressure: 160 psi (1.10 MPa)
- Cylinders: Two, inside
- Cylinder size: 17 in × 24 in (432 mm × 610 mm)
- Valve gear: Stephenson valve gear
Performance figures
- Tractive effort: 15,464 lbf (68.8 kN)
Career
- Operators: London and South Western Railway; → Southern Railway
- Class: 273
- Number in class: 1 January 1923: 6
- Withdrawn: 1906, 1921-1924
- Disposition: All scrapped

The LSWR 273 class was a class of double framed 0-6-0 steam locomotives designed by William George Beattie for the London and South Western Railway (LSWR). Twelve locomotives were built between 1872 and 1873.

== Numbering ==
The twelve locomotives were numbered in two blocks of 6 locomotives each. Between 1898 and 1900, all were placed on the duplicate list, usually by prefixing the number with a "0". Two were scrapped in 1906, but the remainder were renumbered again in 1914–1917 before four more were retired prior to the 1923 grouping, leaving six to pass into Southern Railway ownership on 1 January 1923, before they too were withdrawn and scrapped.

Table of locomotives
First Number	BP Works Number	Date built	Date rebuilt	Date duplicated	Date withdrawn	Notes
273	1163	Jun 1872	Apr 1893	Feb 1898	Dec 1924	Renumbered 273A in Sep 1917
274	1164	Jun 1872	Jul 1895	Feb 1898	Jul 1924	Renumbered 0229 in Jan 1914
275	1165	Jun 1872	Jul 1877	Mar 1898	Apr 1906	
276	1166	Jun 1872	Mar 1887	Apr 1900	Apr 1906	
277	1167	Jun 1872	Jan 1896	Apr 1900	May 1924	Renumbered 277A in Oct 1917
278	1168	Jun 1872	Sep 1886	May 1900	Dec 1924	Renumbered 278A in Sep 1914
285	1269	Feb 1873	Sep 1889	Jan 1900	Sep 1921	Renumbered 286A in Nov 1917
286	1270	Feb 1873	Nov 1886	Feb 1900	Dec 1924	Renumbered 286A in Aug 1917
287	1271	Feb 1873	Jun 1895	Feb 1900	Jan 1922	Renumbered 287A in Nov 1917
288	1272	Feb 1873	Aug 1894	Feb 1900	Dec 1924	Renumbered 288A in Dec 1917
289	1273	Feb 1873	Oct 1886	Feb 1900	Sep 1921	Renumbered 289A in Oct 1917
290	1274	Feb 1873	Mar 1887	Feb 1900	Dec 1921	Renumbered 351 in Dec 1899; renumbered 0351 in Jun 1900; renumbered 351A in Jun 1917
