= Robertsbridge Junction railway station =

Railway station in East Sussex, England

Coordinates: 50.9849°N 0.4689°E

Robertsbridge Junction

General information
- Location: Robertsbridge, Rother; England
- Grid reference: TQ733235
- System: Station on heritage railway
- Operator: Rother Valley Railway
- Platforms: 1

Key dates
- ?: Opened
Location

Robertsbridge Junction is the terminus of the Rother Valley Railway, the extension of the Kent and East Sussex Railway from Bodiam to Robertsbridge. Because the original bay platform at Robertsbridge station cannot be used as this is Network Rail owned property a new station was built next to the old sidings (now a car park). The platform and toilets were built by 2013. A gala weekend in September 2013 saw a steam passenger train operating at Robertsbridge for the first time since the early 1960s. The connection to the Network Rail (NR) mainline was re-established in March 2015 to permit rolling stock transfers, and use of the RVR by Network Rail plant for training and other purposes. Work started in 2024 on the construction of the station building with further structures planned. It was opened on 18th April 2026.

A visitor centre on the site is open to the public each Sunday, A small collection of rolling stock is also stored here, with several items undergoing active restoration.
