= LSWR 318 class =

Class of 6 British 4-4-0T locomotives

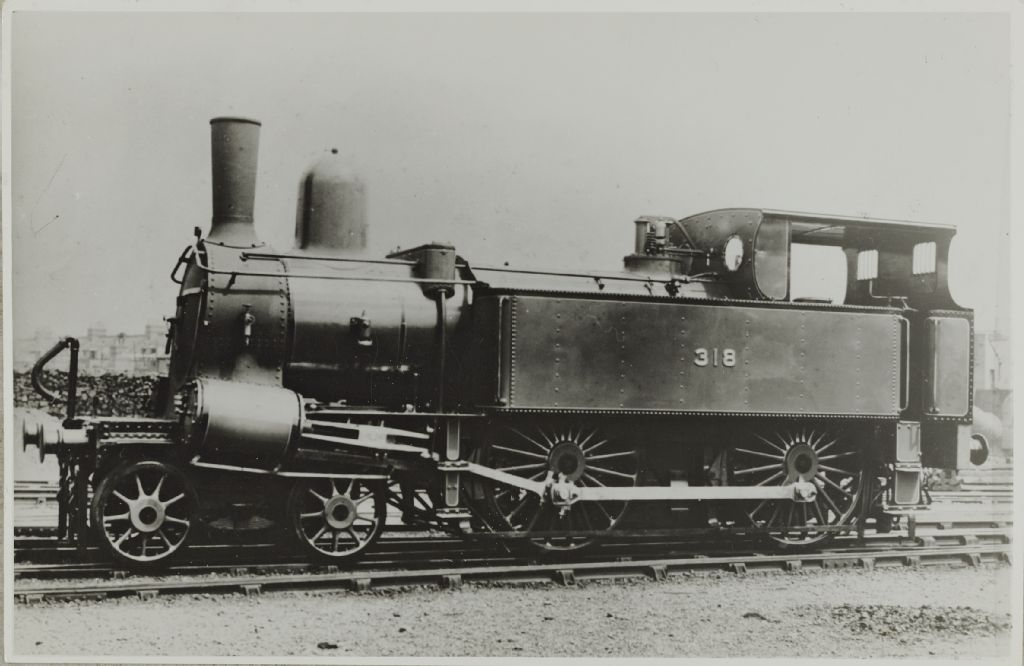
Type and origin
- Power type: Steam
- Builder: Beyer, Peacock and Company
- Build date: 1875
- Total produced: 6
Specifications
- Configuration
  - Whyte: 4-4-0T
- Gauge: 4 ft 8 1/2 in (1,435 mm)
- Leading dia.: 3 ft (0.914 m)
- Driver dia.: 5 ft 0.5 in (1.537 m)
- Axle load: 15.475 long tons (15.723 t; 17.332 short tons)
- Loco weight: 42.1–45.2 long tons (42.8–45.9 t; 47.2–50.6 short tons)
- Fuel type: Coal
- Water cap.: 1,000 imp gal (4,500 L; 1,200 US gal)
- Boiler pressure: 120–130 psi (8.3–9.0 bar; 830–900 kPa) (new); 150 psi (10 bar; 1,000 kPa) (modified)
- Heating surface
  - Tubes: 912.6 sq ft (85 m^{2})
- Cylinders: Two, outside
- Cylinder size: 16 in × 20 in (406 mm × 508 mm)
Career
- Operators: LSWR
- Class: 318
- Withdrawn: 1906–1913
- Disposition: All scrapped

The LSWR 318 class (also known as 'Plymouth' or 'Metropolitan' tanks) was a class of six passenger 4-4-0 tank locomotives supplied by Beyer, Peacock and Company in 1875 for the newly completed Exeter-Plymouth line. They proved to be unsuited to the task for which they were purchased, but were found alternative employments elsewhere on the system.

== Background ==
The completion of the London and South Western Railway line between Exeter and Plymouth was going to require the provision of new passenger locomotives. William George Beattie approached Beyer, Peacock and Company of Openshaw near Manchester for the costs of six 2-4-0 well tank locomotives in 1873. The locomotive builders were unhappy with the design submitted to them and suggested rather their existing design of 4-4-0 side tank locomotives, which had performed well on the Metropolitan Railway. The proposal was accepted and the locomotives were delivered during January and February 1875.

== Design differences ==
The LSWR locomotives did not have the condensing apparatus fitted to the original locomotives and they had metal awnings over the cabs. This created problems when coaling since the coal bunker was situated within the footplate area.

== Stability problems ==
Although the new locomotives performed adequately when used on a range of slower services, as soon as they were used on their intended route after May 1876 the railway received complaints from passengers and crews about their rough riding at speeds over 40 mph (64.37 km/h). They proved to be unstable (even dangerous) at higher speeds, leading to testing on two locomotives in 1877, one fitted with a bogie designed by William Adams before he joined the LSWR and one with a Crewe-type Bissel truck. The improvements achieved were insufficient to justify fitting new bogies on the remainder of the class.

Beattie was censured by the Board of Directors when it became known that he had been aware of the class's rough riding since 1875. Ultimately the class was transferred to the Epsom and Leatherhead services where they performed well at the lower speeds required of them. Adams later made minor adjustments to the bogies, which enabled the class to have more than 30-year careers on a variety of different services. They were all withdrawn and scrapped between 1906 and 1913.
