= LSWR 282 class =

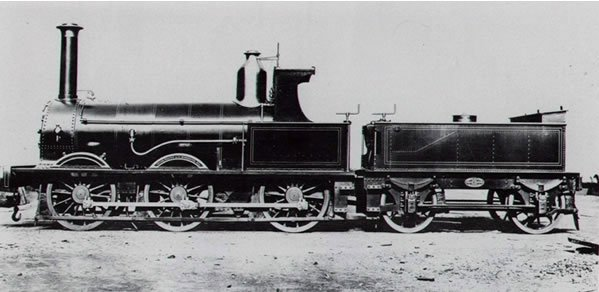
- 'Ilfracombe Goods' as built by Beyer, Peacock
Type and origin
- Power type: Steam
- Builder: Beyer, Peacock and Company
- Build date: 1873-1880
- Total produced: 8
Specifications
- Configuration
  - Whyte: 0-6-0
- Gauge: 4 ft 8 1/2 in (1,435 mm)
- Driver dia.: 4 ft 6 1/2 in (1.384 m) - 4 ft + 1/2 in (1.232 m)
- Loco weight: 35.87–36.7 long tons (36.45–37.29 t; 40.17–41.10 short tons)
- Fuel type: Coal
- Fuel capacity: 2 long tons (2.0 t; 2.2 short tons)
- Water cap.: 1,000 imp gal (4,500 L; 1,200 US gal)
- Boiler pressure: 140 psi (9.7 bar; 970 kPa) (new); 160 psi (11 bar; 1,100 kPa) (modified)
- Cylinders: Two, inside
- Cylinder size: 16 in × 20 in (406 mm × 508 mm)
Career
- Operators: LSWR ·
- Class: 282
- Withdrawn: 1905–1913
- Disposition: Two scrapped, remainder sold

The LSWR 282 class (also known as the "Ilfracombe Goods") was a class of eight mixed traffic 0-6-0 locomotives supplied by Beyer, Peacock and Company to the London and South Western Railway (LSWR) between 1873 and 1880. They were of a standard design of the company and supplied to several other railways overseas.

== Background ==
The branch line between Barnstaple and Ilfracombe in North Devon, due to open in 1874 was going to be particularly difficult to operate due to its steep gradients. In 1870 Joseph Hamilton Beattie, locomotive superintendent of the LSWR proposed a 2-4-0 locomotive for the traffic, but he died in 1871 before he could finalise the design. His son and successor William Beattie rather favoured an 0-6-0 type but had made little progress on his design by 1872 when the Locomotive Committee Chairman became impatient and ‘instructed him to approach the Beyer, Peacock and Company,’ to quote for three light 0-6-0 locomotives to operate freight services on the line.

== Design and construction ==
A contract was signed and the first three locomotives were delivered in February 1873, numbered 282-4. Upon the opening of the new line in 1874 the class was found to be well-suited to both the passenger and freight traffic generated. Two more examples were delivered in 1874 (nos. 300–301) to operate the branch line to Sidmouth and a third in 1875 (no. 324). William Adams, Beattie’s successor, was also impressed by the locomotives and ordered two more examples (nos. 393-394) for use in Devon. These had slightly larger 4 ft 7.5 in (1.410 m) driving wheels stovepipe chimneys and other detailed differences. Between 1888 and 1890 Adams rebuilt the original six locomotives with new cylinders, the larger wheels, larger cabs, enclosed splashers and stovepipe chimneys.

== Performance ==
The locomotives performed well for a quarter of a century, but were gradually replaced on the more demanding roles by more powerful modern designs from 1899 onwards, when they were transferred to the ‘duplicate list’ and moved to lighter duties elsewhere.

== Withdrawals ==
The first two examples were withdrawn in 1905 and their boilers salvaged to provide steam for the company’s locomotive works. The remaining six examples were still in fairly good condition and between 1909 and 1913 were sold to light railways operated by Colonel Holman Stephens, and remained in use until the early 1930s.
