= LSWR 302 class =

Class of British steam locomotives

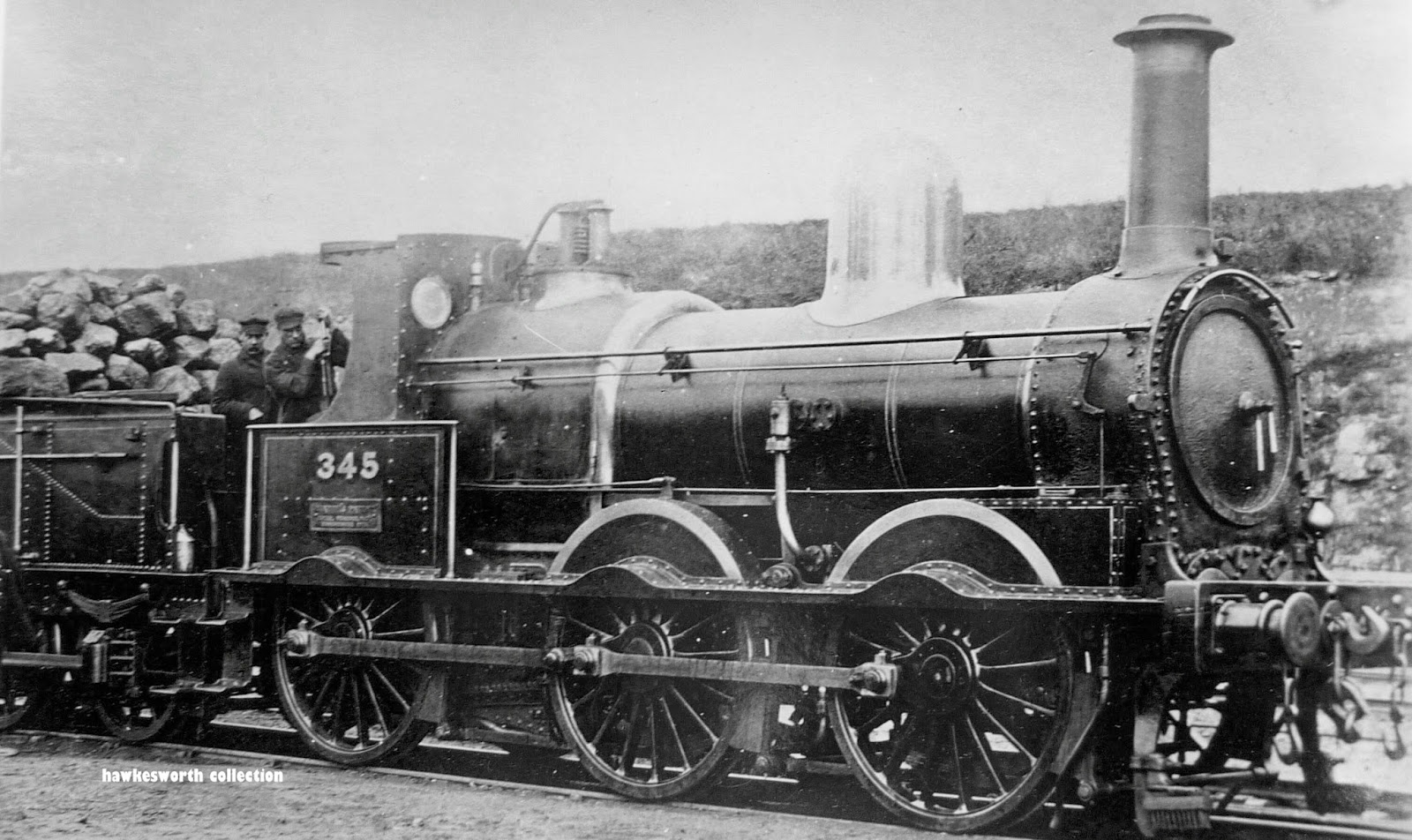
- Seen before 1891
Type and origin
- Power type: Steam
- Designer: William George Beattie
- Builder: Beyer, Peacock & Co.
- Serial number: 1360–1371, 1600–1611, 1777–1788
- Build date: 1874–1878
- Total produced: 36
Specifications
- Configuration
  - Whyte: 0-6-0
  - UIC: C n2
- Gauge: 4 ft 8 1/2 in (1,435 mm)
- Driver dia.: 5 ft 1 in (1.549 m)
- Loco weight: 34.1 long tons (34.6 t)
- Fuel type: Coal
- Boiler pressure: 120 psi (0.83 MPa)
- Cylinders: Two, inside
- Cylinder size: 17 in × 24 in (432 mm × 610 mm)
- Valve gear: Stephenson
Performance figures
- Tractive effort: 10,631 lbf (47.3 kN)
Career
- Operators: London and South Western Railway; → Southern Railway
- Class: 302
- Number in class: 1 January 1923: 15
- Withdrawn: 1889–1925
- Disposition: All scrapped

The LSWR 302 class was a class of 0-6-0 steam locomotives designed by William George Beattie for the London and South Western Railway (LSWR). Thirty-six locomotives were built between 1874 and 1878.

== Description ==
The thirty-six locomotives were built by Beyer, Peacock and Company in three batches of twelve.

Table of orders and numbers
Year	BP serial	Quantity	LSWR numbers	Notes
1874	1360–1371	12	302–313	
1876	1600–1611	12	336–347	
1878	1777–1788	12	151–152, 229–230, 368–373, 160, 162	

Thirty-two locomotives were rebuilt by William Adams between 1886 and 1894; they received new boilers and standard fittings.

Seven locomotives were withdrawn between 1889 and 1893; this included four locomotives that had been rebuilt. The remaining 29 locomotives were placed on the duplicate list between 1894 and 1902. Withdrawals recommenced in 1903, and by the end of 1922, only fifteen remained in service to pass to the Southern Railway at grouping. These were all withdrawn by the end of 1925; all were scrapped.

Table of withdrawals
Year	Quantity in service at start of year	Quantity withdrawn	Locomotive numbers	Notes
1889	36	1	230	
1890	35	1	309	
1891	34	1	339	
1892	33	2	306, 308	308 used as stationary boiler at Salisbury loco depot
1893	31	2	346, 368	
1903	29	1	0307	
1906	28	3	0304, 0340, 0372	All three boilers to stationary use
1913	25	2	0305, 0313	
1914	23	3	0307, 0310, 0312	
1921	20	3	0302, 0303, 0344	
1922	17	2	0336, 0371	
1924	15	10	E337A, E0338, E0341–E0343, E0151, E0152, E370A, E160A, E162A	
1925	5	5	E0311, E0324, E0347, E0229, E0369	
