= St Michaels, Kent =

Coordinates: 51.086°N 0.688°E

St Michaels
- Location within Kent
- Civil parish: Tenterden
- District: Ashford
- Shire county: Kent
- Region: South East
- Country: England
- Sovereign state: United Kingdom
- Post town: Tenterden
- Postcode district: TN30 6
- Police: Kent
- Fire: Kent
- Ambulance: South East Coast
- UK Parliament: Weald of Kent

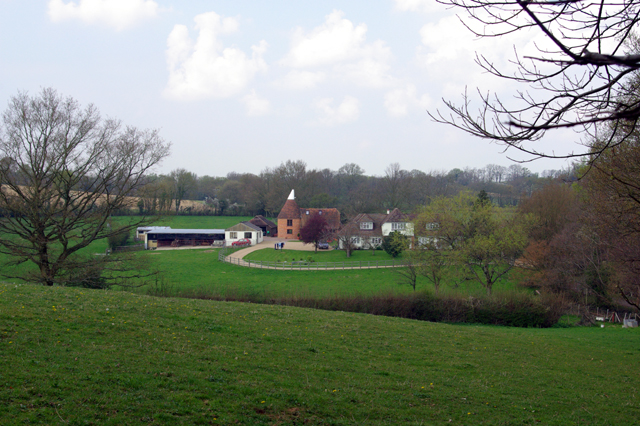
Reader's bridge in St Michaels

St Michaels is a village in the civil parish of Tenterden, in the Ashford district, in the county of Kent, England. Before 1863 it was known as Boar's Isle or Boresisle.
