= Battle railway station =

Railway station in East Sussex, England

Coordinates: 50.913°N 0.495°E

Battle
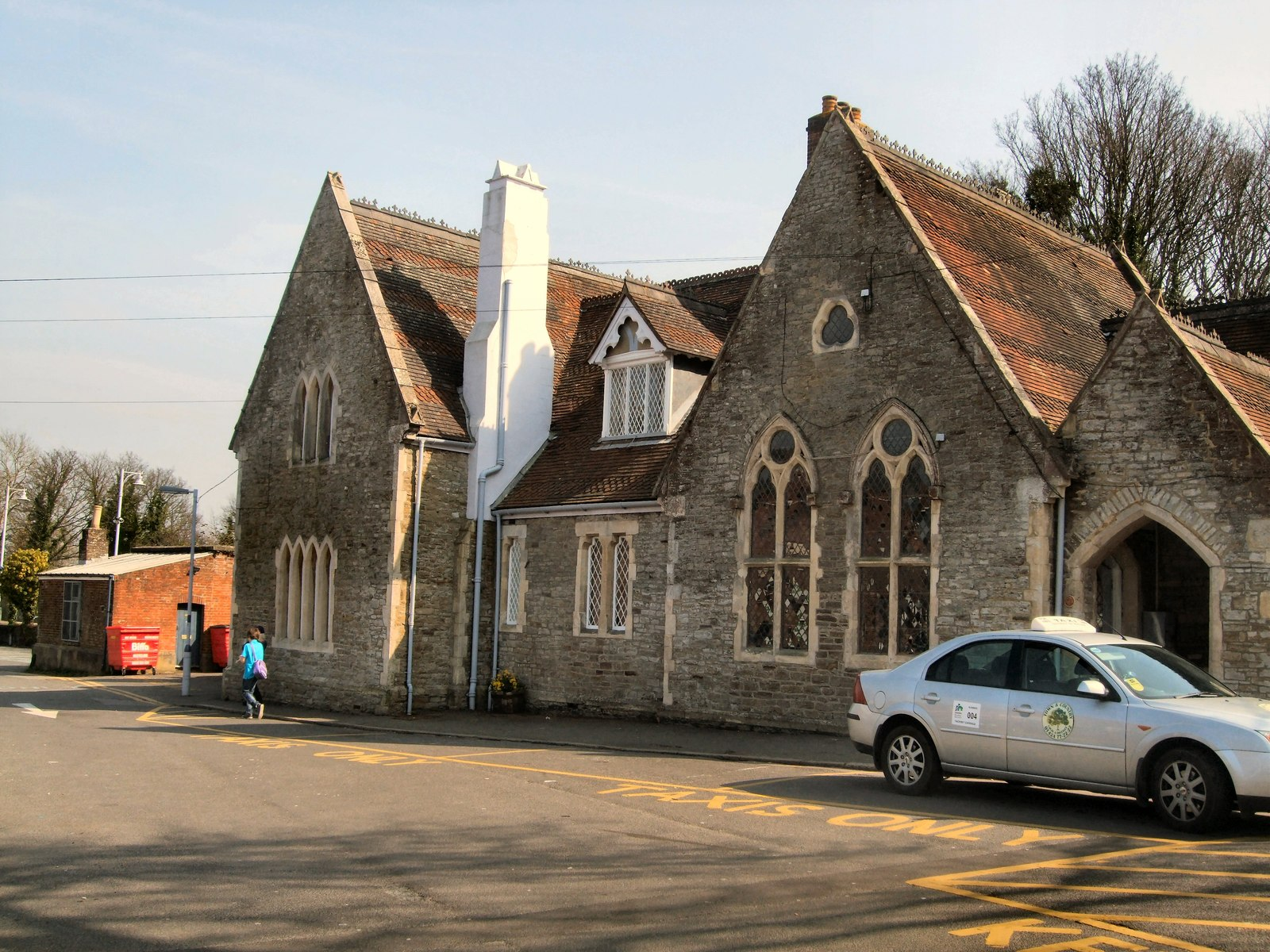
- The station in 2012

General information
- Location: Battle, Rother, East Sussex; England
- Grid reference: TQ754155
- Manager: Southeastern
- Platforms: 2

Other information
- Station code: BAT
- Classification: DfT category D

Key dates
- 1 January 1852: Opened
- 1986: Lengthened and electrified

Passengers
- 2020/21: ▼0.103 million
- 2021/22: ▲0.341 million
- 2022/23: ▲0.401 million
- 2023/24: ▲0.448 million
- 2024/25: ▲0.512 million

Listed Building – Grade II
- Feature: Battle station
- Designated: 13 May 1987
- Reference no.: 1044179
Location
Notes
- Passenger statistics from the Office of Rail and Road

Battle railway station is on the Hastings line in the south of England and serves the town of Battle, East Sussex. It is 55 miles 46 chains (89.4 km) from London Charing Cross. The station and all trains serving it are operated by Southeastern.

== History ==
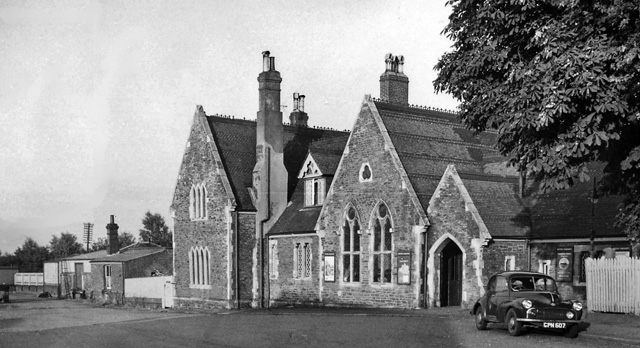
The station in 1962

The Hastings line of the South Eastern Railway opened in stages from the north, the first on 25 November 1846, and was extended from Robertsbridge to Battle on 18 January 1852. It was only the terminus for a month before the line was completed to Bopeep Junction on 18 February 1852.

The station was designed by William Tress. It was listed Grade II in May 1987. The platforms were staggered (they were not opposite each other) and did not overlap as they do now. They were extended for eight-carriage trains before the electrification of the line by British Rail. Electrification using the third rail 750V DC system was completed in April 1986.

== Description ==
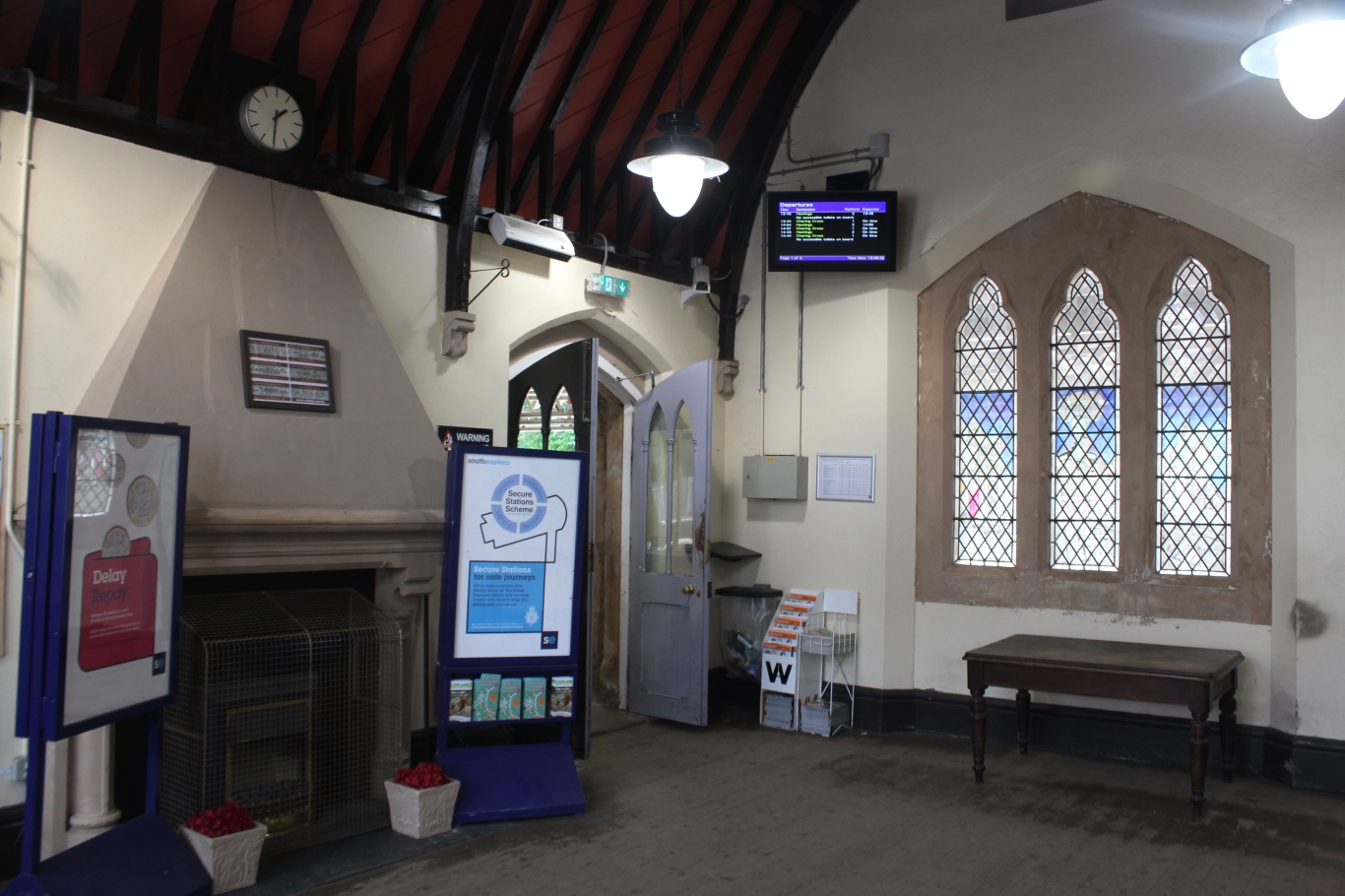
Gothic styling in the ticket office

The station building is in a 13th century style with tall windows and a porch, the design being influenced by the hisoric Battle Abbey. It is built from stone with a tiled roof, with two storeys housing a central booking hall and gabled wings.

Battle is 55 miles 46 chains (89.4 km) from London Charing Cross. It has two platforms. These are linked by a footbridge (with steps on both sides) and a station building housing a ticket office and waiting room. Train information is provided in the form of automated announcements, displays and poster timetables. All the original sidings have now gone and now form part of the car park.

== Services ==
All services at Battle are operated by Southeastern using Class 375 EMUs.

The typical off-peak service in trains per hour is:

- 2 tph to London Charing Cross
- 2 tph to Hastings (1 semi-fast, 1 stopping)

Additional services, including trains to and from and London Cannon Street and Ore call at the station in the peak hours.

Preceding station	National Rail	Following station
Robertsbridge	Southeastern (Hastings Line)	Crowhurst
	Disused railways	
Terminus	British Rail Southern Region (Bexhill West Branch Line)	Crowhurst
Robertsbridge	South Eastern Railway (Hastings Line)	West St Leonards

== Connections ==
No bus services now run from directly outside the station, although bus routes 95 and 1066 towards Hastings, Hastings Conquest Hospital, Bexhill-on-Sea, Hawkhurst and Tunbridge Wells stop at the end of the long approach road. These services are all operated by Stagecoach South East.
