= LSWR 395 class =

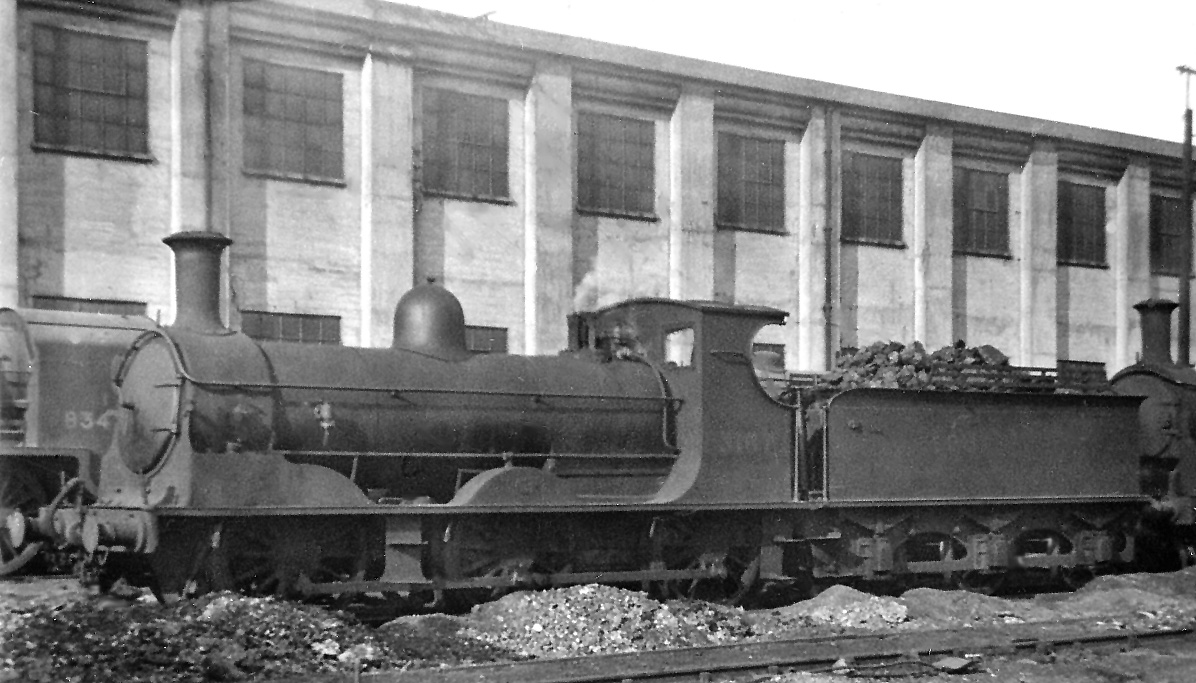
- 3167 at Feltham depot 1947
Type and origin
- Power type: Steam
- Designer: William Adams
- Builder: Neilson & Co.
- Serial number: Neilson 2747–2758, 2939–2950, 3376–3395, 3453–3466
- Build date: 1881–1886
- Total produced: 70
Specifications
- Configuration
  - Whyte: 0-6-0
  - UIC: Cn
- Gauge: 4 ft 8 1/2 in (1,435 mm)
- Driver dia.: 5 ft 1 in (1.549 m)
- Length: 48 ft 0 3/4 in (14.65 m)
- Height: 12 ft 5 5/8 in (3.80 m)
- Axle load: 13.6 long tons (13.8 t)
- Adhesive weight: 37.6 long tons (38.2 t)
- Loco weight: 37.6 long tons (38.2 t)
- Tender weight: 31.65 long tons (32.2 t)
- Fuel type: Coal
- Fuel capacity: 3 long tons (3.0 t)
- Water cap.: 2,500 imp gal (11,000 L; 3,000 US gal)
- Boiler pressure: 140 psi (0.97 MPa)
- Cylinders: Two, inside
- Cylinder size: 17.5 in × 24 in (444 mm × 610 mm)
Performance figures
- Tractive effort: 15,533 lbf (69.1 kN)
Career
- Operators: London and South Western Railway; Railway Operating Division; Palestine Railways; Mesopotamian Railways; Southern Railway; British Railways
- Class: 460
- Power class: LSWR / SR: G BR: 2F
- Number in class: 1 January 1923: 20; 1 January 1948: 18
- Withdrawn: 1916–1918, 1933, 1950-1959
- Disposition: All scrapped

The LSWR 395 class was a class of goods 0-6-0 steam locomotives designed for the London and South Western Railway by William Adams as part of his modernisation programme. All 70 were constructed by Neilson and Company between 1881 and 1886. The last 34 locomotives differed in being slightly longer and heavier.

== On the LSWR 1881-1923 ==
Early members of the class were numbered in a continuous series of new numbers 395-406. Some later batches re-used numbers of withdrawn or duplicated locomotives. The 395 was a long-lived class, with several lasting for 70 years. Between 1908 and 1924, 54 locomotives were renumbered to the duplicate list by prefixing their existing number with a "0".

Table of locomotive orders
Year	Builder serial number	Quantity	LSWR Numbers	Notes
1881	Neilson & Co. 2747–2751	5	395–399	
1882	Neilson & Co. 2752–2758	7	400–406	
1883	Neilson & Co. 2939–2950	12	153–167	
1883	Neilson & Co. 2956-2967	12	433–444	
1885	Neilson & Co. 3376–3391	16	496–511	
1885	Neilson & Co. 3453–3462	10	27–30, 67, 71, 101, 105, 134, 148	67 and 71 renumbered 83 and 84 in 1889
1886	Neilson & Co. 3392–3395	4	512–515	
1886	Neilson & Co. 3463–3466	4	168, 172, 174–175	

== Outside the UK 1916-1945 ==
Between 1916 and 1918, fifty locomotives were sold to the British Government for use by the Railway Operating Division of the Royal Engineers. These included all 16 not in the duplicate list. The ROD transferred 36 of the class to its Palestine Military Railway and nine for service in the Mesopotamian campaign. In 1918, seven of those delivered to Palestine were transferred to Mesopotamia.

In 1919, military-controlled railways and equipment in Mesopotamia were transferred to the civilian Mesopotamian Railways, including all 16 class 395's which the new company renumbered 423-438. In 1920 the civilian Palestine Railways was formed and took over the remaining PMR lines and stock, including all 29 class 395's remaining in Palestine. In 1928 PR withdrew 22 of the class and sold them for scrap. The remaining seven (0166, 0395, 0398, 0405, 0444, 503 and 508) remained in PR service until 1936 and were not scrapped until 1944-45.

== In the UK 1923-1959 ==
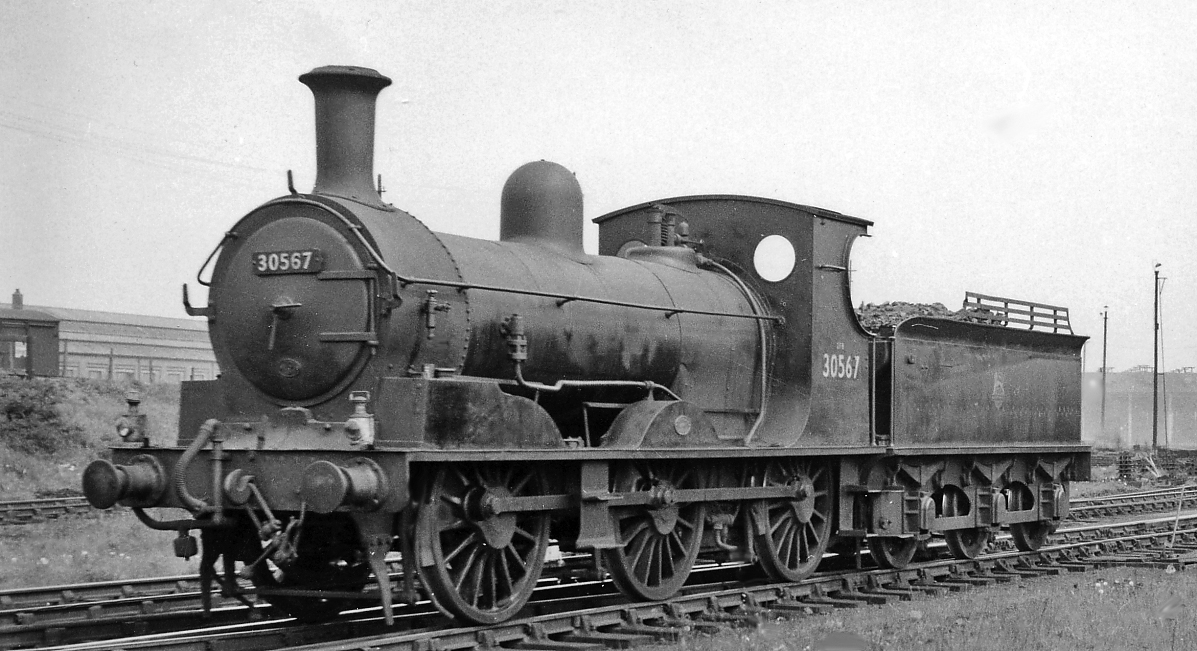
No. 30567 at Feltham Locomotive Depot 11 May 1959.

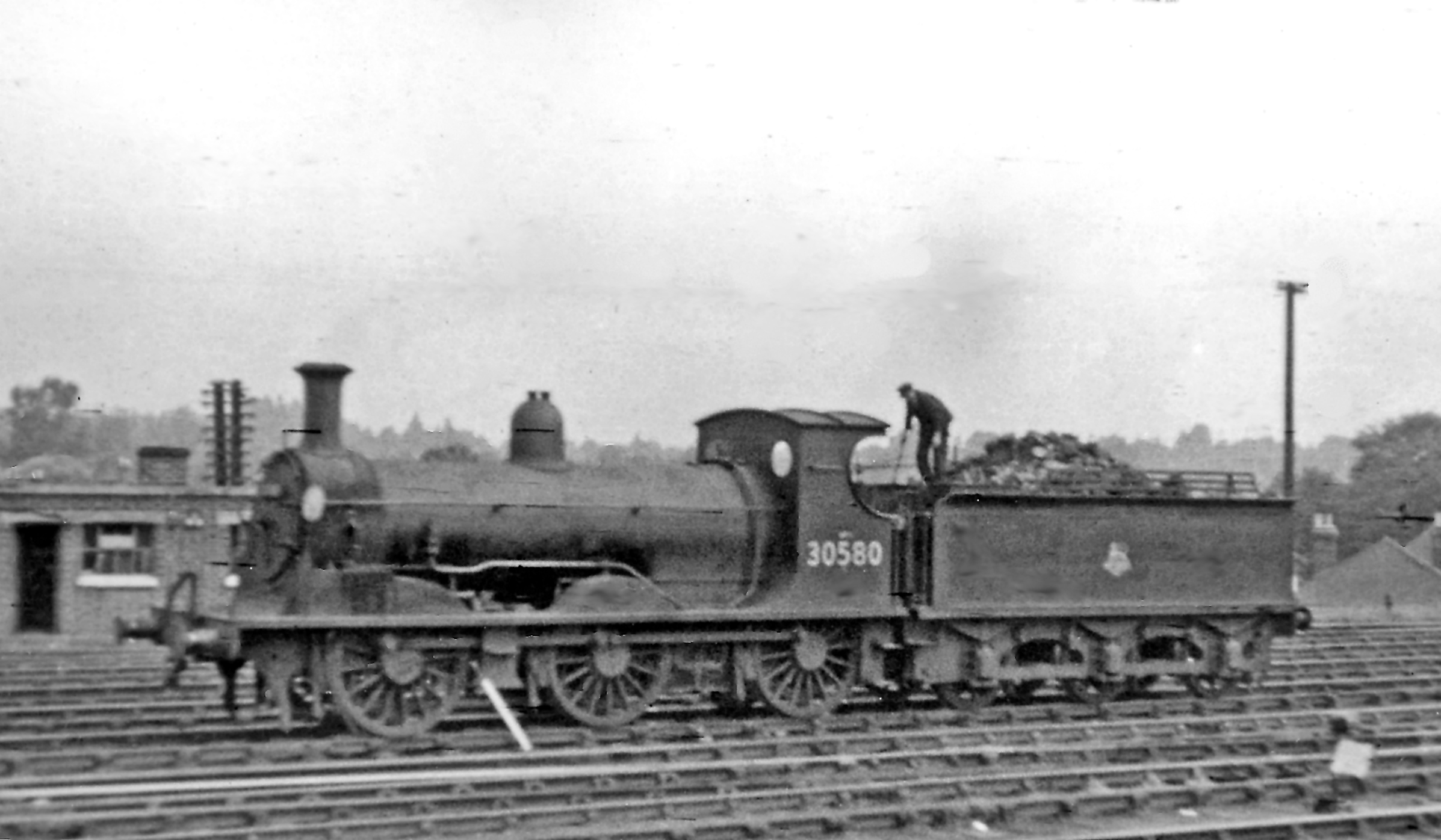
No. 30580 shunting at Woking in 1955

Lswr 395 at Halwill Junction

After the First World War, twenty class 395's remained in Great Britain in L&SWR service: 029, 083, 0101, 0153–0155, 0163, 0167, 0397, 0400, 0433, 0436, 0439–0442, 0496, 0506, 0509, 0515. As per the Railways Act 1921, these passed to the Southern Railway (SR) on its formation in 1923. In 1933, the SR withdrew 0153 and 0515. In 1948 under the nationalisation of Britain's Railways, the remaining 18 locomotives entered British Railways stock and were renumbered in a continuous series 30564–30581. Withdrawals resumed in 1950, with the last one, 30567 (originally 154) being withdrawn in September 1959 after 76 years of service. All were scrapped.

Table of withdrawals
Year	Quantity in service at start of year	Quantity withdrawn	Locomotive numbers	Notes
1916	70	17	084, 0104, 0148, 0157, 0159, 0164, 0166, 0172, 0175, 0395, 0399, 0405, 0435, 507, 510, 511, 513	all sold to the Government
1917	53	27	027, 028, 030, 0156, 0158, 0168, 0174, 0396, 0398, 0401–0403, 0438, 0443, 0444, 497–505, 508, 512, 514	all sold to the Government
1918	26	6	0105, 0165, 0404, 0406, 0434, 0437	all sold to the Government
1933	20	2	E153A, E515A	
1950	18	1	30576	ex 440
1953	17	3	30565, 30571, 30581	ex 83, 397, 509
1956	14	5	30569, 30570, 30573, 30577, 30579	ex 163, 167, 433, 441, 496
1957	9	4	30572, 30574, 30578, 30580	ex 400, 436, 442, 506
1958	5	3	30564, 30568, 30575	ex 29, 155, 439
1959	2	2	30566, 30567	ex 101, 154
