= Cripps Corner =

Village in East Sussex, England

Coordinates: 50.9629°N 0.529319°E

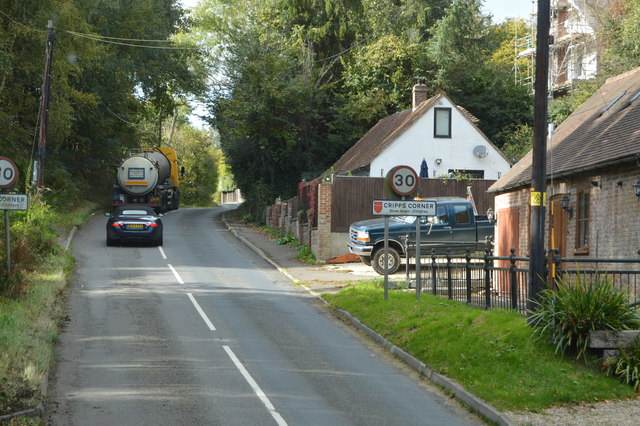
- Entering Cripps Corner on the B2089

- Location within East Sussex
- OS grid reference: TQ777212
  - London: 46 miles (74 km) NW
- District: Rother
- Shire county: East Sussex
- Region: South East
- Country: England
- Sovereign state: United Kingdom
- Post town: ROBERTSBRIDGE
- Postcode district: TN32
- Dialling code: 01580
- Police: Sussex
- Fire: East Sussex
- Ambulance: South East Coast
- UK Parliament: Bexhill and Battle

Cripps Corner is a village in the civil parish of Ewhurst and the Rother district of East Sussex, England. It is in the High Weald Area of Outstanding Natural Beauty, and on a southern ridge of the valley of the River Rother which flows through Bodiam, 2.5 miles (4 km) to the north of Cripps Corner.

Cripps Corner is one of three settlements in Ewhurst parish, the others being Staplecross and Ewhurst Green to the north. The village borders, and extends over the north-east edge of Sedlescombe civil parish, and is 24 miles (40 km) east-northeast from the county town of Lewes, and 2 miles (3 km) east from the A21 road which in East Sussex runs north to south from Flimwell to Hastings. The village is centred on the convergence of three roads forming an open triangle. These roads are the B2165 which runs from Cripps Corner to Beckley at the north-east; the B2089 from the A21 road at the west to Rye at the east; and the B2244 from The Moor (village) in Hawkhurst at the north to Sedlescombe at the south, which within the settlement is named Junction Road.

A viaduct carries the B2089 over the B2244. It was built in 1834 by Stephen Putnam of St Leonards-on-Sea who was responsible for the improvement of the East Sussex section of the road between the Medway towns and Hastings. Putnam followed the designs of Thomas Telford who had, a short while beforehand, been responsible for road-over-road bridges in Kent.

The closest school is Staplecross Methodist Primary School to the north in Staplecross. To the north-east, adjacent to the village on the B2165 to Staplecross, is a garden centre and a plant nursery. To the north on the B2244 is a Glamping site. To the west on the B2089 is a pet supplies company; and, at Swaile's Green, a furniture maker & seller. Adjacent at the south, on the B2244 in Sedlescombe, is an organic vineyard and a small light industrial site. Opposite the vineyard is the site venue for the annual 'Big Green Cardigan', a multi-genre music event for approximately 500 people.

Cripps Corner is connected by bus to Hastings, Bodiam, and Hawkhurst (349); Etchingham, Sedlescombe, and Bexhill-on-Sea (360); Westfield, Northiam, Staplecross, and Robertsbridge (381); Westfield, and Robertsbridge (382); Peasmarsh, Sedlescombe, and Robertsbridge (383); and Mountfield, Broad Oak, and Battle (B72). The closest railway station is 2.5 miles (4 km) north at Bodiam, part of the heritage Kent and East Sussex Railway linking to the town of Tenterden to the north-east. The closest National Rail station is at Robertsbridge on the Hastings line, 3 miles (5 km) to the north-west, linking to Tunbridge Wells and Hastings.

== Landmarks ==
Brede High Woods, an ancient woodland of 647 acres (2.6 km^{2}) owned by the Woodland Trust, is 1 mile (1.6 km) to the east on the B2089 road.

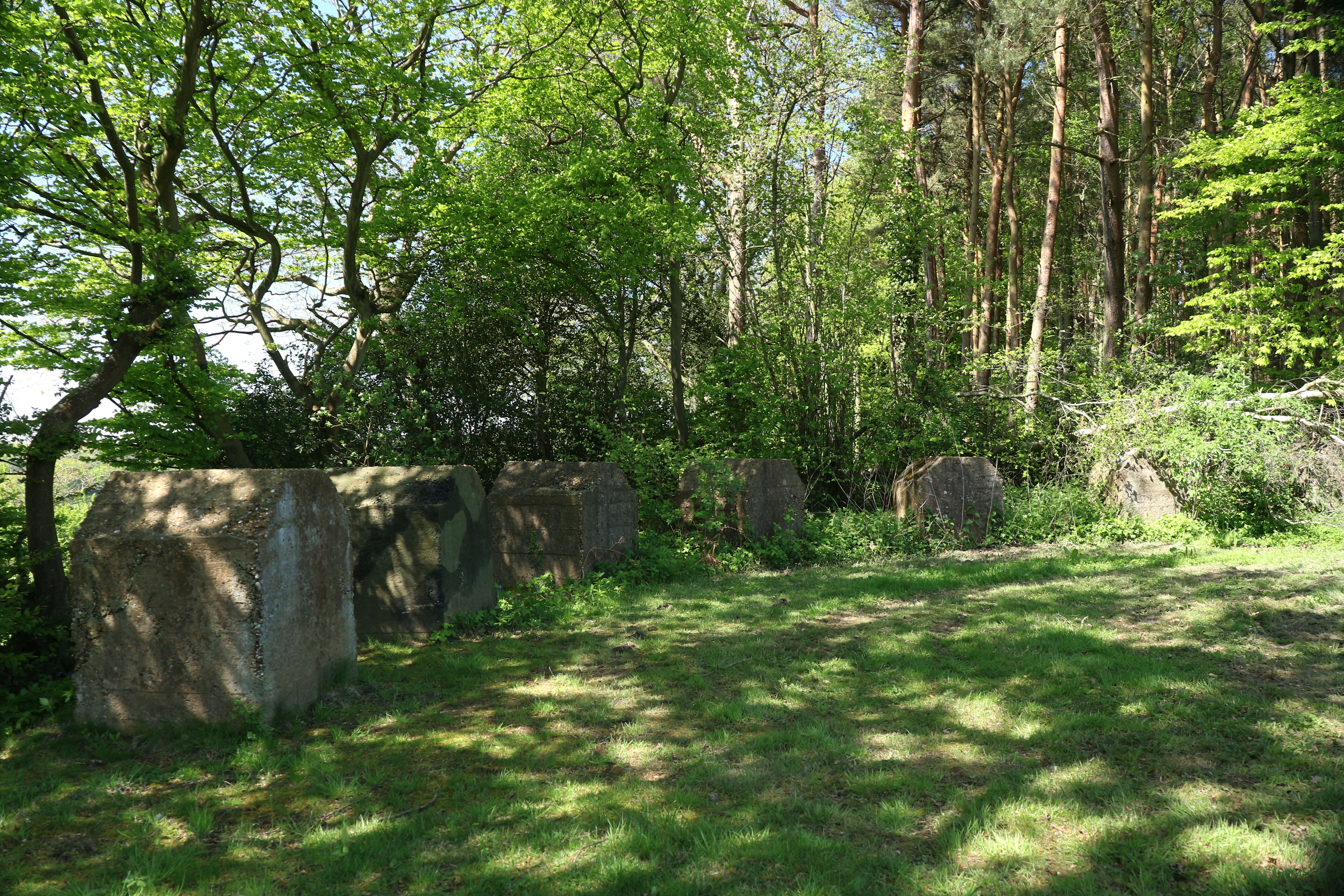
Second World War anti-tank blocks at Cripps Corner

At the north-west of Cripps Corner and approximately 100 yards (90 m) north from the B2089 road, are 75 Second World War concrete anti-tank blocks of up to 6 feet (2 m) high, the remains of one sector of defences that surrounded Cripps Corner. This line of traps stretch through fields from Cripps Corner to Poppinghole Lane, a road which runs north from the adjacent hamlet of Swaile's Green. The traps surrounding Cripps Corner were augmented with pillboxes, and provided a defence in vulnerable sectors not protected by the "heavily-wooded" surroundings of the village. In the summer and autumn of 1940 Cripps Corner was considered an enclosed 'fortress', or 'nodal point' in a line of defence using natural or man-made barriers which extended southwestward from the village, and southeastward to the sea at the north-east of Hastings. The Archaeology Data Service states that the Cripps Corner defences "represents the finest surviving example in the country of the concrete anti-tank perimeter defences".

Within Cripps Corner, defined by East Sussex County Council's village entry road signs, are three Grade II listed buildings. 'Forge House', on the B2165 and opposite the garage, and The White Hart pub, which is a two-storey red brick house of two bays, with a gabled porch, dating to the early 19th century. 'Bre Cottage', a two-storey house on the B2089, 250 yards (230 m) south-east from its junction with the B2165, dates to the late 18th- and early 19th century. The 18th-century front part, which sits on a brick plinth, is of timber framing overlaid with white-painted weatherboarding, with a central gabled porch. The 19th-century rear of the building is constructed of two brick and stone gables, the walls of the upper parts with overlapping red tile facings. On the B2244 Junction Road, 125 yards (110 m) south from its junction with the B2165, is the early 19th-century 'Chittlebirch', a two-storey, three-bay, tiled-roof house of brick laid in Flemish bond of alternate red stretchers and gray headers.

At 130 yards (120 m) outside the village at the side of the B2165 is the Grade II 18th-century 'Beaconsfield House', of two storeys with a half-hipped roof, the ground floor of white-painted brick, the upper with overlapping red tile facing.
