= Ewhurst, East Sussex =

Parish in East Sussex, England

Coordinates: 50.978°N 0.535°E

Ewhurst
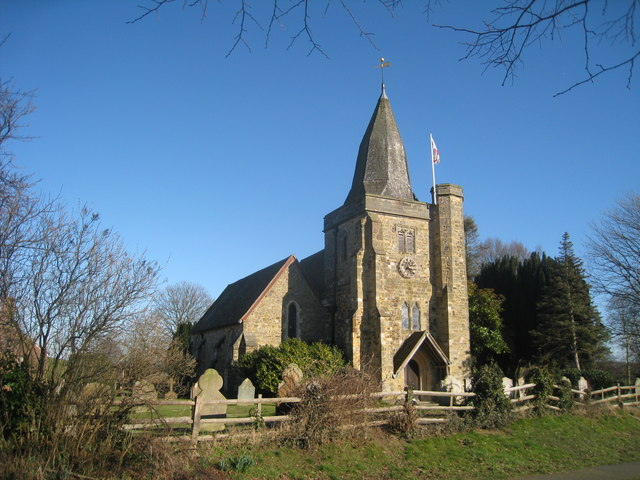
- St James' Church, Ewhurst Green

- Location within East Sussex
- Area: 23.64 km^{2} (9.13 sq mi)
- Population: 1,130 (2011)
  - Density: 115.3/sq mi (44.5/km^{2})
- OS grid reference: TQ799238
  - London: 46 miles (74 km) NW
- District: Rother
- Shire county: East Sussex
- Region: South East
- Country: England
- Sovereign state: United Kingdom
- Post town: ROBERTSBRIDGE
- Postcode district: TN32
- Dialling code: 01580
- Police: Sussex
- Fire: East Sussex
- Ambulance: South East Coast
- UK Parliament: Bexhill and Battle

Ewhurst is a civil parish in the Rother district of East Sussex, England. The parish is on the southern ridge of the River Rother valley, and much of the northern boundary of the parish follows the river. The centre of the parish is 24 miles (40 km) east-northeast from the county town of Lewes, and 9 miles (14 km) north from the coastal town of Hastings.

The parish is one of farms, woods, dispersed residences and businesses, and the settlements of Staplecross (the largest), Collier's Green, Ewhurst Green, and Cripps Corner.

There are two parish churches, one dedicated to St. James the Greater in Ewhurst Green, and one to St Mark in Staplecross. There are two public houses: the Cross Inn at Staplecross and The White Dog at Ewhurst Green. The White Hart at Cripps Corner closed its doors in 2021.

The former A229 road (now the B2244) crosses the parish from north to south. The Kent and East Sussex Railway follows the river in the north of the parish, where Bodiam station takes its name from the neighbouring parish of Bodiam. The line closed in 1961 but has been partly reopened as a heritage railway, which was extended to Bodiam in 2000; the station is at present the southern terminus.

== Governance ==
Ewhurst is part of the electoral ward called Ewhurst and Sedlescombe. The population of this ward at the 2011 census was 2,606.
