= Staplecross =

Village in East Sussex, England

Coordinates: 50.9735°N 0.536117°E

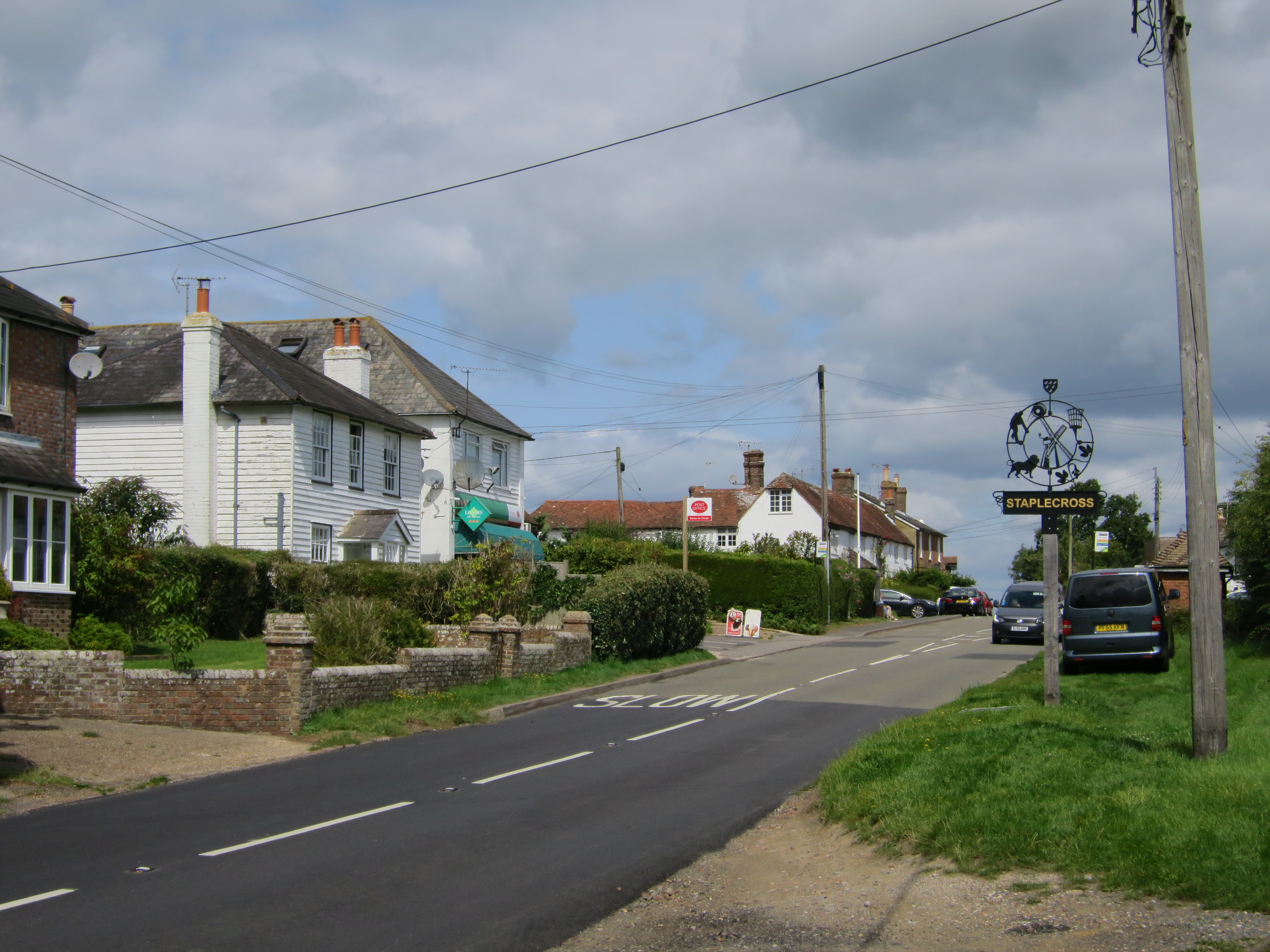
- B2165 road at Staplecross

- Location within East Sussex
- Area: 0.2525 km^{2} (0.0975 sq mi)
- Population: 760 (2011 census)
  - Density: 3,010/km^{2} (7,800/sq mi)
- OS grid reference: TQ7812
  - London: 45 miles (72 km) NW
- District: Rother
- Shire county: East Sussex
- Region: South East
- Country: England
- Sovereign state: United Kingdom
- Post town: ROBERTSBRIDGE
- Postcode district: TN32
- Dialling code: 01580
- Police: Sussex
- Fire: East Sussex
- Ambulance: South East Coast
- UK Parliament: Bexhill and Battle

Staplecross is a village in the civil parish of Ewhurst and the Rother district of East Sussex, England. Staplecross is the largest settlement in Ewhurst parish, and is on a southern ridge of the valley of the River Rother which flows through Bodiam at the north of Staplecross. The village is in the High Weald Area of Outstanding Natural Beauty. In 2011 it had a population of 760.

Staplecross is 24 miles (40 km) east-northeast from the county town of Lewes, and 3 miles (5 km) east from the A21 road, which in East Sussex runs north to south from Flimwell to Hastings. It is on the B2165 road which runs from the Ewhurst parish village of Cripps Corner, 1,500 yards (1,400 m) to the south, to Beckley, 4 miles (6 km) to the east. While in Staplecross the B2165 locally becomes Northiam Road. The village is centred on the junction of Northiam Road, and Bodiam Road which runs to Bodiam Castle, 2 miles (3 km) to the north.

Community amenities and facilities include a village hall with the adjacent Staplecross Club, The Cross Inn public house, a Londis convenience store & post office (the only post office in the parish), a bowls club, and a playing field with a children's play area. On Bodiam Road is Staplecross Methodist Primary School, north from which is a park with tennis courts. At the east of the village is the small red brick parish church of St Mark's which includes a preschool playgroup. A war memorial is at the junction of Northiam Road and Bodiam road.

To the south, outside the village on the B1265 is a garden centre and a plant nursery, and at the east, a cattery. At 3 miles to the north-east, in Northiam, is the Lutyens house and gardens of Great Dixter. On the B2244, less than 1 mile north-west from the village, is the 5.5 acres (2.2 hectares) Stainsmoor Wood, managed by a charitable trust.

Staplecross is connected by bus to Hastings, Bodiam and Hawkhurst (349), and Westfield, Northiam and Robertsbridge (381). The closest railway station is at Bodiam, part of the heritage Kent and East Sussex Railway, 1.5 miles (2.4 km) to the north, linking to the town of Tenterden at the north-east. The closest National Rail station is at Robertsbridge on the Hastings line, 3 miles to the west, linking to Tunbridge Wells and Hastings.

== Landmarks ==
Within Staplecross, defined by East Sussex County Council's village entry road signs, are fifteen Grade II listed buildings and structures.

On Bodliam Road is 'Wrens Cottage' a two-storey, weatherboarded and hipped-roof cottage dating to the 18th century or earlier; the early 19th-century two-storey 'School House'; the two-storey 'Brewery House' of red brick with hipped roof from the early 18th century, also its adjacent outbuilding of red brick below, weatherboarding above, and hipped roof, coupled with a conical oast house with cowl and fantail, from the late 18th or early 19th century; 'The Old Mill', a red brick former mill building with 1815 datestone; 'The Mill House', a two-storied and weatherboarded house from the early 19th century; and three two-storey 18th-century cottages of white-painted brick and half-hipped roofs. Behind the 18th-century cottages, and on Forge Lane, are the conjoined 'Forge House', probably 17th-century, and 'Forge Cottage', 18th-century. Both are of a brick wall ground floor with overlapping red tile facing above, the House also with a hipped roof.

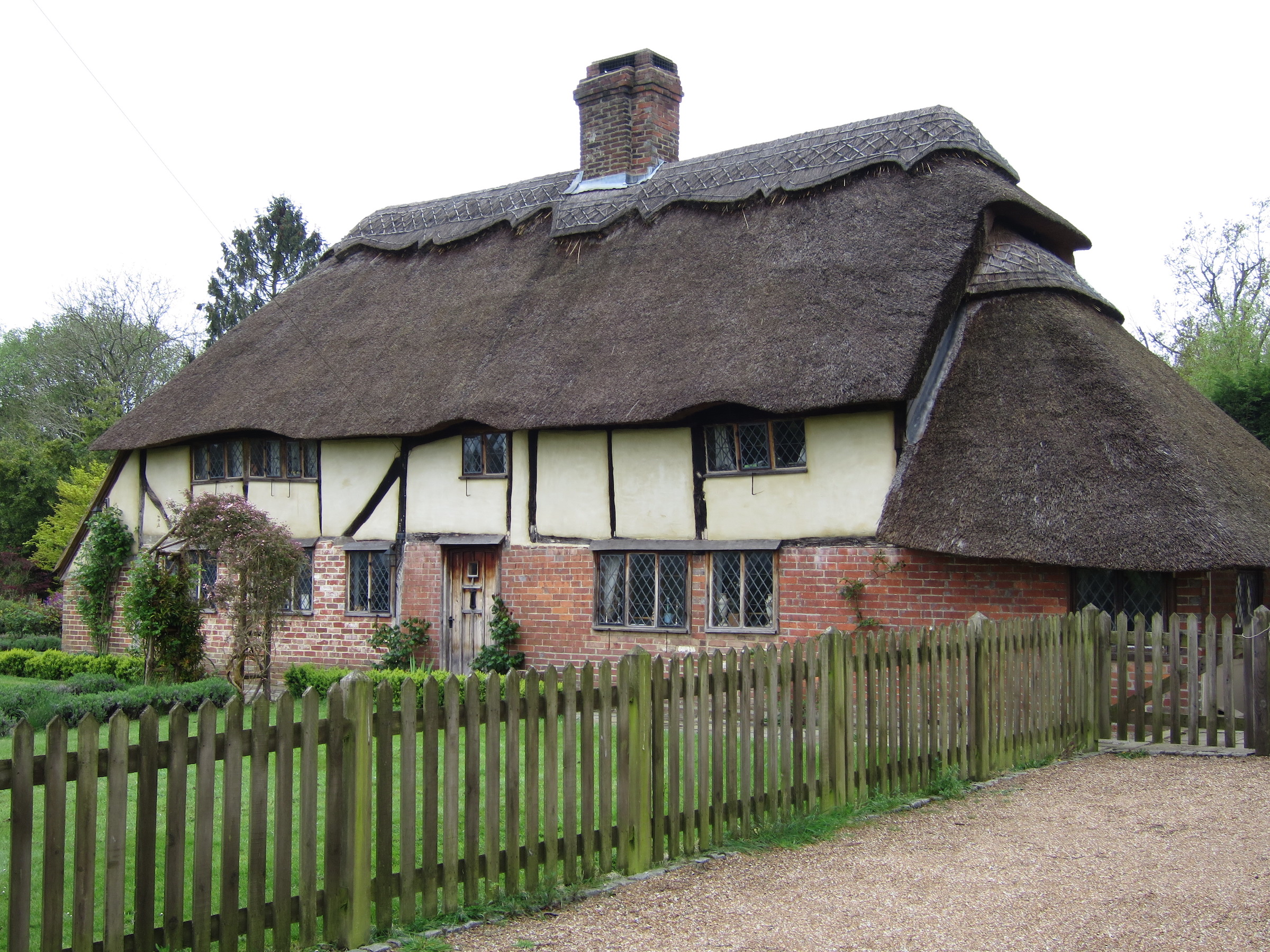
Solomon's Garden cottage

At the junction of Northiam Road, Bodiam Road and Forge Lane, is Staplecross War Memorial to the memory of those killed in the First and Second World Wars; unveiled in 1921, it is 9 feet (3 m) high, of Portland stone, and surmounted by a reclining lion. Opposite is the 'Cross Inn', the northern part of which is listed, being two-storey and L-shaped of two wings. the 18th-century north wing is of red brick below with overlapping red tile facing above, the 19th-century west wing completely red brick. South from the war memorial junction on the west side of Northiam Road are three listed cottages. The first, adjacent to and north from the Londis store are the conjoined two-storey 'Manor Cottage' and 'Stratfield Cottage' dating to at least the 18th century, of red brick below with overlapping red tile facing above. The second, adjacent to and south from the Londis store, is the early 19th-century two-storey 'Edgell Cottage', of three bays and weatherboarded, with sash windows, a hipped slate roof and a gabled central porch. The third, in the second plot down from Edgell Cottage and just inside the village, is the 15-century two-storey 'Solomon's Garden', timber-framed with infill of plaster set on a ground floor red brick plinth; the roof is thatched and hipped.

At the east from the war memorial on the north side of Northiam Road is a terraced range of four listed early 19th-century two-storey cottages, the brick ground floor, and weatherboarding above, painted white. The back of the range is of eight gables. Adjacent and detached to the east is the early 19th-century 'South View', similar in style and of two bays, weatherboarded, and white painted. Further east, beyond Staplecross village hall, and opposite Cricketers Field (road), is 'Marigolds', a two-storey three-bay house dating to the 18th century. Its ground floor is stuccoed and painted white, and with a central wood trellis porch, with overlapping red tile facing above. Further east again are 'Bowling Alley Cottages' opposite the village bowling green. The building was a conjoined range of three cottages, today two, and dates to the 18th century. The range has gabled porches, and is of two-storeys in painted brick, with a hipped roof and first floor of overlapping red tile facing on the west-most cottage.
