= Hastings Unitarian Church =

Church in East Sussex, England

- Hastings Unitarian and Free Christian Church
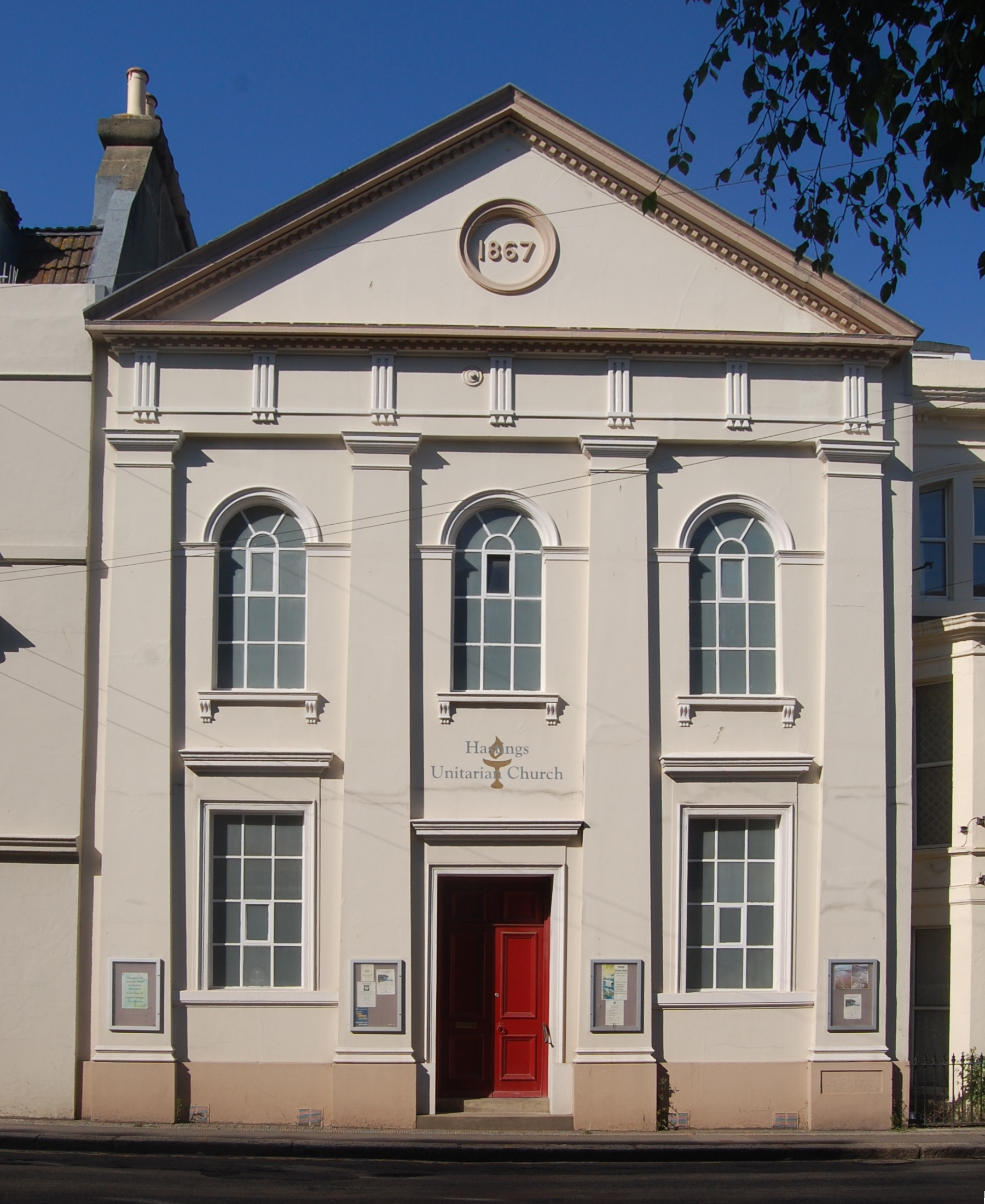
- The church in June 2020

- 50°51′30″N 0°34′52″E
- Location: 7a South Terrace, Hastings, East Sussex TN34 1SA
- Country: England
- Denomination: Unitarian
- Website: www.hastingsunitarianchurch.org

History
- Status: Church
- Founded: 1867
- Founder: John Bowring

Architecture
- Functional status: Active
- Architect: George Beck
- Style: Neoclassical
- Years built: 1867–68
- Completed: 1868

Hastings Unitarian Church, also known as Hastings Unitarian and Free Christian Church, is a place of worship for Unitarians in the town and borough of Hastings, one of six local government districts in the English county of East Sussex. It has been in continuous use since it was built in 1868, having been founded the previous year by prominent Unitarian John Bowring for a congregation which had met in hired premises since 1858. The church, designed by George Beck, is Neoclassical in style and has an 18th-century organ.

== History ==
A Unitarian congregation was founded in Hastings in 1858. At first, members met for worship in a music hall and then from 1860 at the Swan Hotel (where the town's first Baptists had also worshipped in the late 1830s until Wellington Square Baptist Church was built). In 1867 the congregation was able to open a permanent place of worship. John Bowring, a political economist, member of parliament, Governor of Hong Kong, polyglot, hymnwriter and one of "the most famous Unitarians of his time", was the founder. The chapel was built in the middle of a terrace of houses on South Terrace, near Hastings railway station, by G. Clarke Jones to the design of architect George Beck. It opened in 1868, one of many Unitarian places of worship to be completed during a period when "confidence flowed into the movement" and rapid growth was taking place. A particular feature of this era was the opening of chapels in many seaside resorts such as Hastings, primarily to serve wealthy retirees.

In the 1870s Northiam Unitarian Chapel, about 12 miles (19 km) north of Hastings, began to be served as a mission station from Hastings Unitarian Church. This chapel, which had 18th-century origins, had been closed for some time but was rebuilt and formally reopened in 1879.

The chapel has a Snetzler organ built c. 1760 which has previously been used in three other Unitarian churches. It was first installed at a chapel built in 1794 at Bunting Nook near Sheffield to replace a private chapel at Norton Hall. When this was demolished in 1853, it was moved to the Unitarian church at Banbury, from where it went to Westgate Chapel in Lewes. It was then bought and installed in the chapel at Hastings in 1930. William Hill & Son & Norman & Beard Ltd. restored the organ in 1995, and Matthew Copley made further repairs in 2010.

== Architecture ==
By the mid-19th century the Gothic Revival style had become very common for Nonconformist chapels and meeting houses, just as it had for Church of England parish churches. Unitarian chapels of this era were typically in this style, too: "the story of chapel architecture in the later 19th century is the story of the Gothic Revival". In parts of Sussex, though, chapels with a plain Classical or Neoclassical appearance, harking back to the Georgian era with their pediments and stuccoed façades, persisted until late in the Victorian era. Hastings Unitarian Church is an example of this, along with (among others) Galeed Strict Baptist Chapel, Brighton (1868) and All Saints United Reformed Church, Burgess Hill (1881).

The church has been described as a Neoclassical or Classical building with rendered brick walls, now painted. Its date, 1868, makes it "a very late example" of this style: the Pevsner Architectural Guides describe it as being "in the style of 20 years previously". It is a "plain, small" chapel topped with a pediment and with a three-bay façade with tall arched windows and tapering pilasters. There are similar arched windows on the rear elevation, some of which have stained glass. Inside, both side walls have an arcade of four blank arches. The pulpit is of carved wood and cast iron, and two cast iron pillars of the Corinthian order hold up the gallery.

== Administration ==
The church is registered for worship in accordance with the Places of Worship Registration Act 1855; its number on the register is 18508. Under the name Unitarian Christian Church it was registered for the solemnisation of marriages in accordance with the Marriage Act 1836 on 2 December 1872.

== See also ==
- Media related to Hastings Unitarian Church at Wikimedia Commons
- List of places of worship in Hastings

== Bibliography ==
- Antram, Nicholas; Pevsner, Nikolaus (2013). Sussex: East with Brighton and Hove. The Buildings of England. London: Yale University Press. ISBN 978-0-300-18473-0.
- Elleray, D. Robert (1981). The Victorian Churches of Sussex. Chichester: Phillimore & Co. Ltd. ISBN 0-85033-378-4.
- Elleray, D. Robert (2004). Sussex Places of Worship. Worthing: Optimus Books. ISBN 0-9533132-7-1.
- Hague, Graham; Hague, Judy (1986). The Unitarian Heritage: An Architectural Survey (PDF) (1st ed.). Sheffield: Unitarian Heritage. ISBN 0-9511081-0-7.
