= Sandhurst, Kent =

Village in Kent, England

Coordinates: 51.0261°N 0.5629°E

Sandhurst
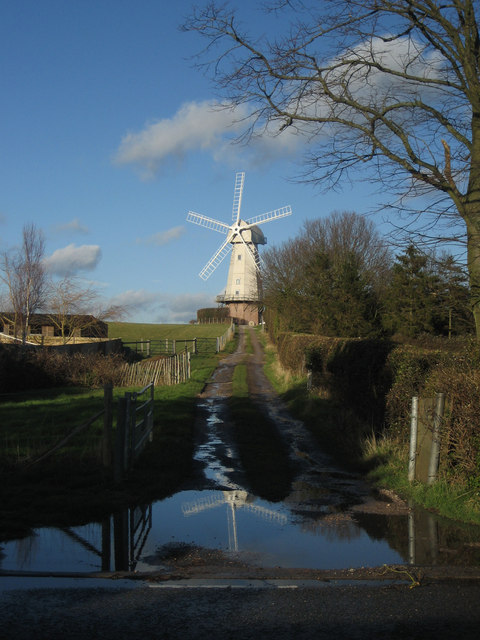
- Sandhurst windmill

- Location within Kent
- Population: 1,478 (2011 Census)
- OS grid reference: TQ798283
- District: Tunbridge Wells
- Shire county: Kent
- Region: South East
- Country: England
- Sovereign state: United Kingdom
- Post town: Cranbrook
- Postcode district: TN18
- Dialling code: 01580
- Police: Kent
- Fire: Kent
- Ambulance: South East Coast
- UK Parliament: Tunbridge Wells

Sandhurst is a village in the borough of Tunbridge Wells in Kent, England, close to the border with East Sussex. It is situated on the A268 road near the villages of Hawkhurst and Northiam.

The Black Death in 1348-49 is believed to be the cause of why the church in Sandhurst is so far from the main village, although it could also be explained by an increase in trade heading from Hawkhurst to Rye, where the majority of the village now rests.

== Facilities ==
- Sandhurst Primary School is in the centre of the village and was founded in 1909.
- 'Johnson's of Sandhurst', formerly 'Mace' after a supplier change, is the main shop, selling a variety of food and other items as well as housing the post office. There are also a beauty salon, a tea room, a garage and a hardware store.
- St. Nicholas' Church is located in Sandhurst Cross, about a mile south from the main village. There is also a Baptist church, located on the A268, Rye Road.
- Sandhurst windmill (Ringle Crouch Green) has been rebuilt from the base, which was all that remained. It now serves as a house, but supplies electricity.
- There is a social club on the back road in the village, open to members and guests, providing live entertainment as well as facilities for darts, pool, and television.
- The New Swan is the only public house in the village, offering food and drinks as well as regular live entertainment and karaoke nights.
- There are two tea rooms in the village.

== Roads ==
The main road through the village is the A268, Rye Road. Bodiam Road leads to Bodiam in the south; Sponden Lane at the western end of the village goes to Benenden, to the north of the village. Sandhurst is served by the Arriva Southern Counties number 5 bus to Maidstone, but not on Sundays.

== Twinning ==
Sandhurst is twinned with the village of Heuringhem in northern France. There is an active Sandhurst Twinning Association.

== Landmarks ==
Significant landmarks in the village include the clock tower, which was built in 1889 in memory of Arthur Oakes and is a grade II listed building, and Sandhurst War Memorial, which was designed by Sir Edwin Lutyens and unveiled in 1923 and sits in an elaborate setting; it is also grade II listed.
