= William Vidler =

English nonconformist minister and editor

William Vidler (4 May 1758 – 23 August 1816) was an English nonconformist minister and editor, ultimately of universalist views.

== Life ==
The tenth child of John and Elizabeth Vidler, he was born at Battle, Sussex, on 4 May 1758. As a boy he was kept from school by poor health, and was apprenticed to his father, a bricklayer. Brought up in the Church of England, he became an Independent through the preaching of George Gilbert of Heathfield, and himself began to preach in April 1777. He became a Baptist under the influence of Thomas Purdy, a Baptist minister at Rye. Having received adult baptism in January 1780, he was set apart on 16 February for the ministry, and formed on 28 March a small Baptist church at Battle.

In May 1791 Vidler undertook to travel among Baptist churches to collect funds for building a chapel. This introduced him to Arminian Baptists, and some universalists. At the end of 1792 he professed universalism and his church divided; those who adhered to him were excommunicated by the local association in the summer of 1793. He accepted a call to assist Elhanan Winchester at Parliament Court, Artillery Lane, London, and began his duties on 9 February 1794. Later in the year Winchester returned to America, and Vidler was appointed his successor, still giving half his time to Battle, till November 1796. He retained his ministry at Parliament Court till 1815, and was succeeded after a short interval by William Johnson Fox. In 1795 he founded a Unitarian Chapel in the Sussex village of Northiam.

Vidler's stipend was small, and from 1796 to 1806 he tried to increase his income as a bookseller. He was in partnership first with John Teulon; then in 1798, for a short time with Nathaniel Scarlett, whom he left because Scarlett published ‘The British Theatre;’ he carried on business by himself in the Strand, London and (from 1804) in Holborn. In conjunction with Teulon he began in January 1797 The Universalist's Miscellany, a monthly periodical. This brought him into connection with Richard Wright, who converted him to his Unitarian views by 1802. In January 1802 the title of his magazine was altered to The Universal Theological Magazine; it was run in co-operation with Robert Aspland, and continued to the end of 1805, when Aspland bought it out, and began in January 1806 the Monthly Repository.

Later in life Vidler did much outreach work with the Unitarian Fund (founded 1806). He died on 23 August 1816, and was buried on 28 August in the graveyard of the Unitarian chapel, Hackney. He married (1780) a daughter of William Sweetingham of Battle; she died on 22 December 1808. His grandson, William Vidler (d. 24 March 1861), was for many years minister to the poor at Chapel Street, Cripplegate.

== Works ==
Vidler wrote sermons and tracts, and also published:

- A Sketch of the Life of Elhanan Winchester, 1797.
- Letters to Mr. Fuller on the Universal Restoration, 1803. To Andrew Fuller.

== Sources ==
- Brackney, William H. A Genetic History of Baptist Thought: With Special Reference to Baptists in Britain and North America. Macon, GA: Mercer University Press, 2004. pp. 127, 129-130.
- "Vidler, William" . Dictionary of National Biography. London: Smith, Elder & Co. 1885–1900.

Attribution

This article incorporates text from a publication now in the public domain: "Vidler, William". Dictionary of National Biography. London: Smith, Elder & Co. 1885–1900.
