= Sandhurst War Memorial =

World War I memorial in Sandhurst, Kent, England

- United Kingdom
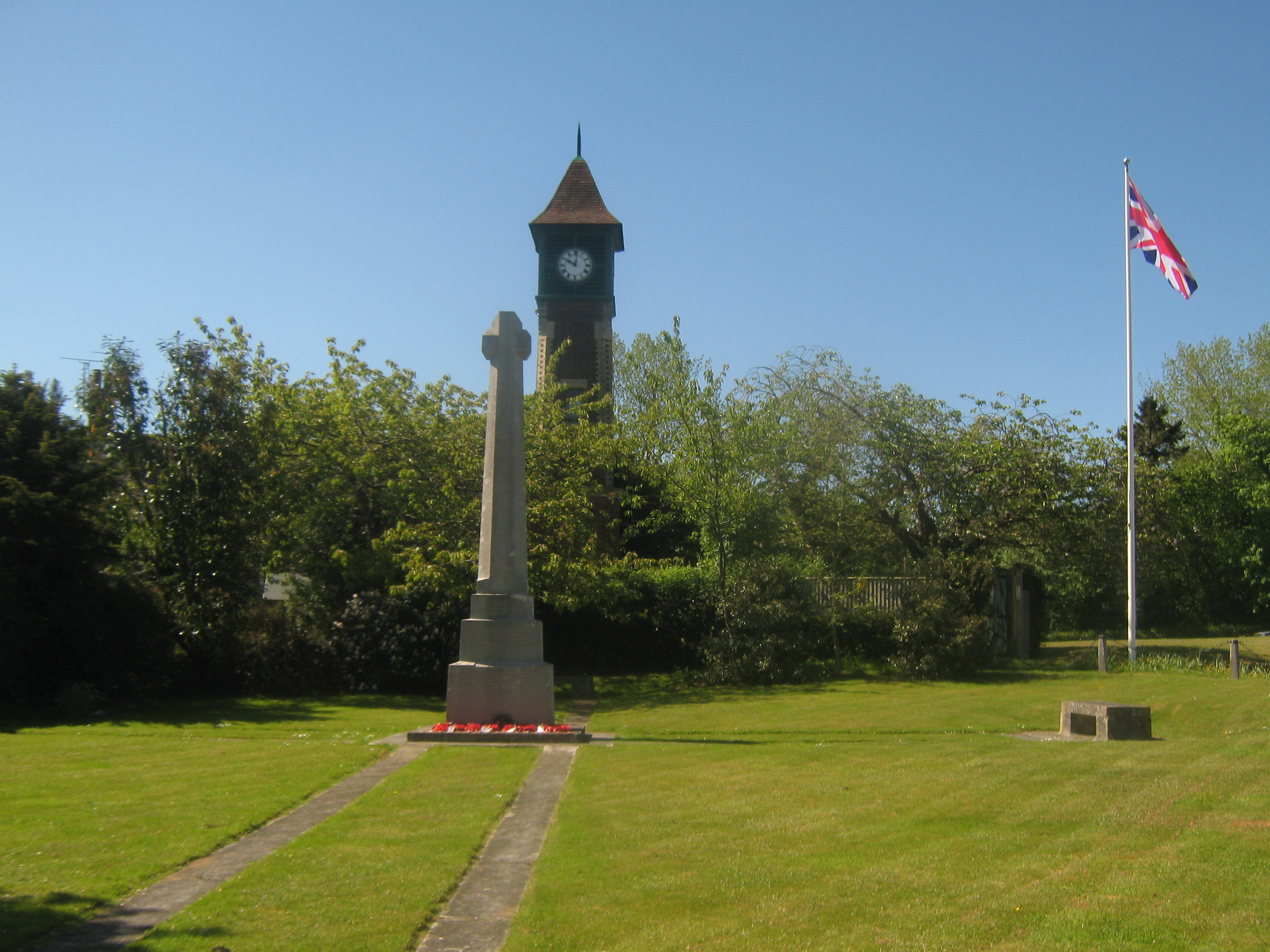
- For men from Sandhurst killed in the First World War
- Unveiled: August 1923
- Location: 51.02682°N 0.56318°E; The Green, Sandhurst, Kent near Hastings (East Sussex), Royal Tunbridge Wells (Kent)
- Designed by: Sir Edwin Lutyens

Listed Building – Grade II
- Official name: Sandhurst War Memorial
- Designated: 5 July 1993
- Reference no.: 1336752

Sandhurst War Memorial is a First World War memorial in the village of Sandhurst in Kent, south-eastern England, close to the border with East Sussex. The memorial is one of fifteen War Crosses by Sir Edwin Lutyens and arguably the one with the most elaborate setting. It was unveiled in 1923 and is today a grade II listed building.

== Background ==
In the aftermath of the First World War and its unprecedented casualties, thousands of war memorials were built across Britain. Amongst the most prominent designers of memorials was the architect Sir Edwin Lutyens, described by Historic England as "the leading English architect of his generation". Lutyens designed the Cenotaph on Whitehall in London, which became the focus for the national Remembrance Sunday commemorations, as well as the Thiepval Memorial to the Missing—the largest British war memorial anywhere in the world—and the Stone of Remembrance which appears in all large Commonwealth War Graves Commission cemeteries and in several of Lutyens's civic war memorials. Sandhurst's memorial is one of fifteen War Crosses by Lutyens, all of which share a broadly similar design.

Prior to the outbreak of the First World War, Lutyens established his reputation by designing country houses for wealthy clients; many of Lutyens' commissions for war memorials originated with pre-war friends and clients. In the case of Sandhurst, it appears Lutyens had a close personal friendship with a local resident, James Wilson.

== History and design ==
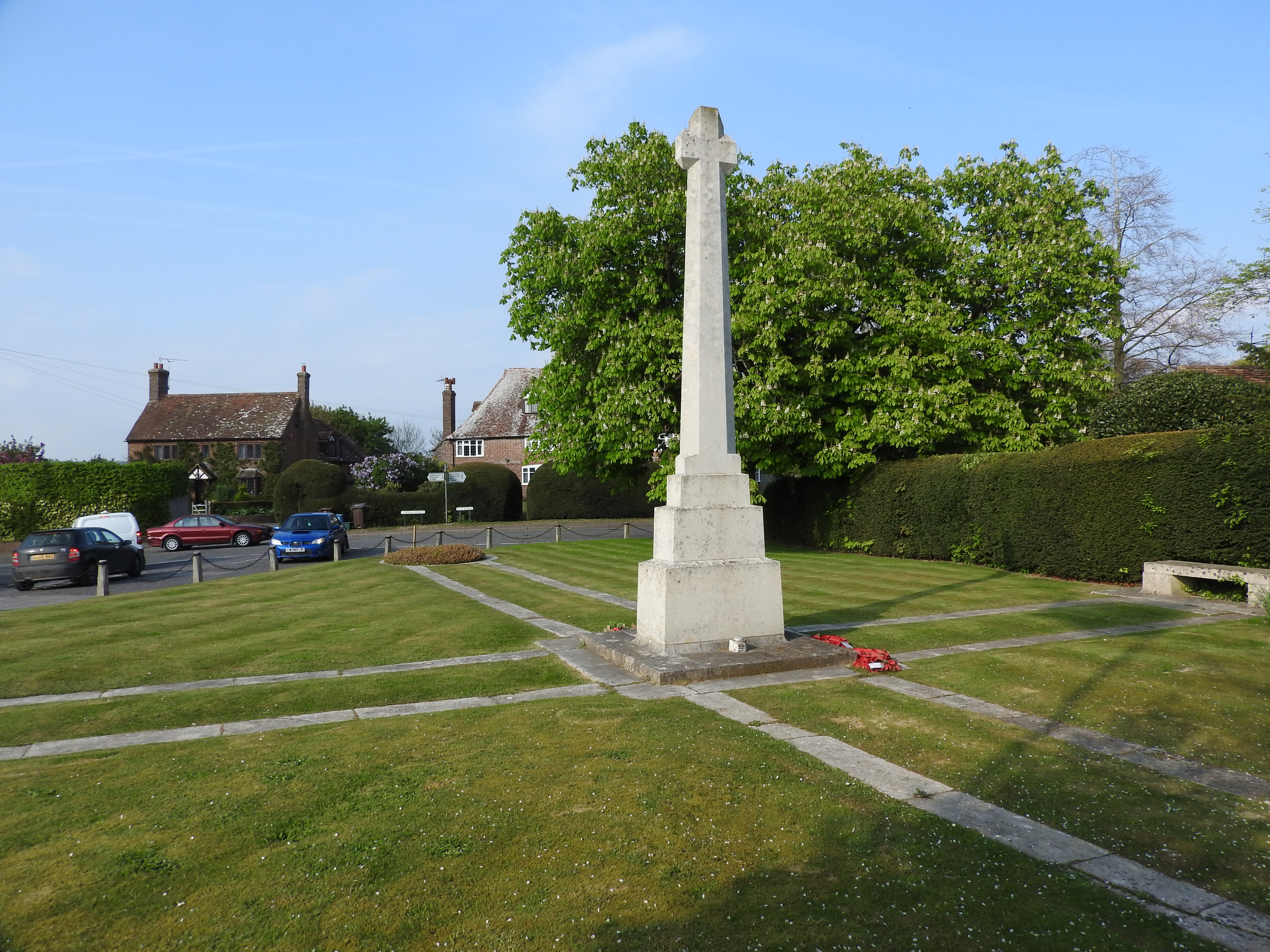
Parallel strips of Portland stone, form a white cross in the lawn, and the tapering Lutyens' War Cross rises from a plinth in the crossing.

The village established a war memorial committee, which was chaired by Mr Herbert Alexander and chose a site on Goddards Green in the centre of the village, in front of the village's clock tower, which dates from 1889.

The memorial consists of a Portland stone cross to Lutyens' War Cross design, with a tapering shaft and short arms moulded close to the top, with a sword and a laurel wreath in relief carving. The cross sits on a plinth of three rectangular stone blocks and a base of two shallow stone steps. The dedication is inscribed on the top section of the plinth: "TO THE BRAVE MEN OF SANDHURST WHO GAVE THEIR LIVES IN THE GREAT WARS" (the "s" added later in tribute to the dead from the Second World War); the middle section bears the dates of the First World War and the names of the village's fallen. The dates of the Second World War and the names of the fallen from that conflict were later added to the bottom section. The whole memorial sits on a base of a single shallow step (rather than the three steps commonly found at other Lutyens memorials).

The setting is one of the most elaborate for Lutyens' war memorials. The clock tower rises behind the cross on its main axis, while parallel strips of Portland stone leading out from each side of the base form a large cross in the grass. The tip and arms are terminated by stone benches, while the foot is terminated by a circular flower bed, which is itself bordered by Portland stone.

The memorial unveiling by George Goschen, 2nd Viscount Goschen was reported in the local newspaper on 17 August 1923.

Sandhurst War Memorial was designated a grade II listed building on 5 July 1993. In November 2015, as part of the commemorations of the centenary of the First World War, Lutyens's war memorials were recognised as a "national collection" and all of his free-standing memorials in England were listed or had their listing status reviewed and their National Heritage List for England list entries were updated and expanded.
