= Northiam =

Village and parish in East Sussex, England

Coordinates: 50.99°N 0.60°E

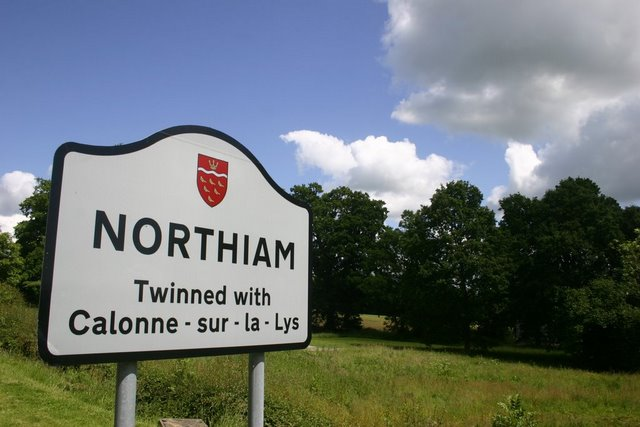
- Northiam sign (from Rye)

- Location within East Sussex
- Area: 14.5 km^{2} (5.6 sq mi)
- Population: 2,083 (Parish-2011)
  - Density: 374/sq mi (144/km^{2})
- OS grid reference: TQ825249
  - London: 47 miles (76 km) NW
- District: Rother
- Shire county: East Sussex
- Region: South East
- Country: England
- Sovereign state: United Kingdom
- Post town: RYE
- Postcode district: TN31
- Dialling code: 01797
- Police: Sussex
- Fire: East Sussex
- Ambulance: South East Coast
- UK Parliament: Bexhill and Battle

Northiam is a village and civil parish in the Rother district, in East Sussex, England, 13 miles (21 km) north of Hastings in the valley of the River Rother. The A28 road to Ashford, Canterbury and Hastings passes through it.

== Governance ==
Northiam has nine parish councillors elected by the village parishioners. The council usually meets once a month for a general meeting and sometimes twice a month if there are planning applications to be looked at. The Parish Council has an office at the Village Club in the centre of the village.

Rother District Council provides the next level of government with services such as refuse collection, planning consent, leisure amenities and council tax collection. Northiam lies within the Rother Levels ward, which provides two councillors.

East Sussex county council is the third tier of government, providing education, libraries and highway maintenance. Northiam falls within the Northern Rother ward.

The UK Parliament constituency for Northiam is Bexhill and Battle.

Prior to Brexit in 2020, the village was part of the South East England constituency in the European Parliament.

== Landmarks ==
There is a Site of Special Scientific Interest within the parish. Officially designated as Northiam, it refers to a disused and partially flooded quarry on the outskirts of Northiam village. It is of geological, palaeoenvironmental and palaeogeographic interest.

The historic house Great Dixter is found within the village. Many parts of the village are listed including Frewen College (formally Brickwall House School), which is a day and boarding school for dyslexic children. It is believed to have been the first such school in the country, set up by Admiral Frewen. Centred on a Grade I listed Jacobean mansion named Brickwall after the extensive boundary walls, many period features have been retained in both the house and gardens.

Brickwall is where Elizabeth I's slippers could for many years be found, given as a memento after she rested under the oak on Church Road. The slippers were retained by the Frewen family when the rest of the property was given to The Frewen Educational Trust in 1972.

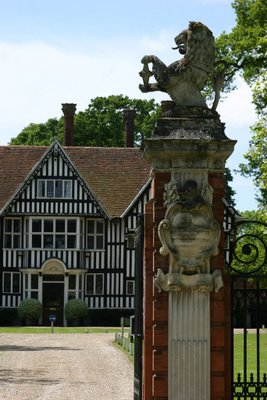
Frewen College, Grade I

=== St. Mary's Church and war memorial ===
The parish church is dedicated to St Mary which is home to six bells and over the years was funded and supported by the Frewens (which is now the private school).

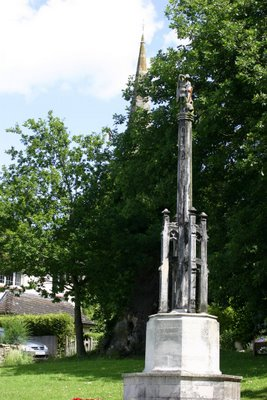
St. Mary’s Church, War Memorial and Queen Elizabeth Oak

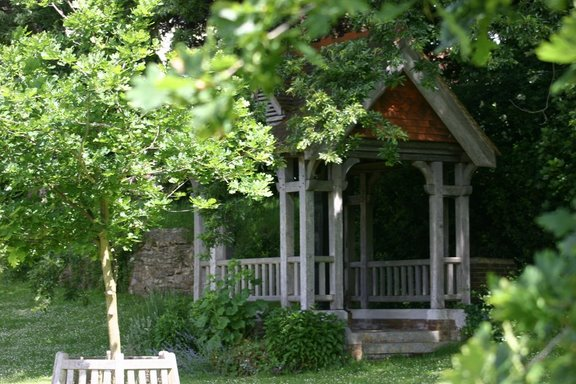
Northiam Village Pump

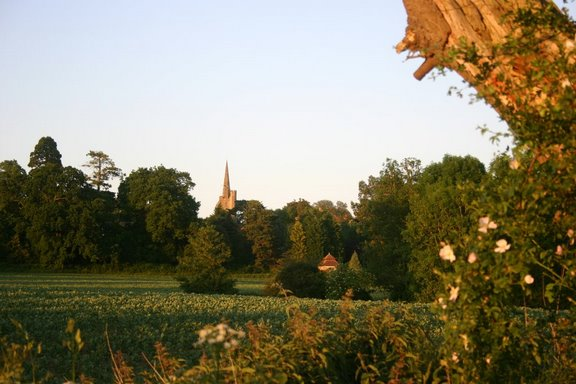
St. Mary’s Church Spire from Countryside

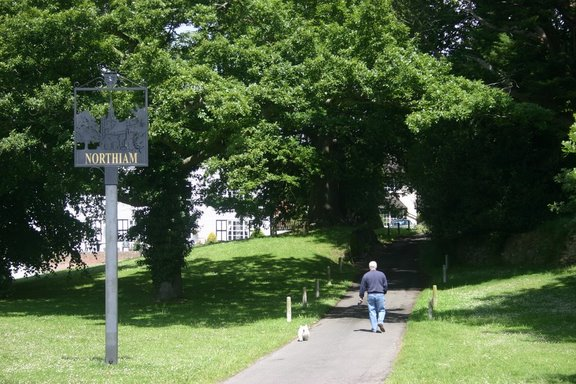
Church Road

=== Four Prime Ministers for D-Day ===
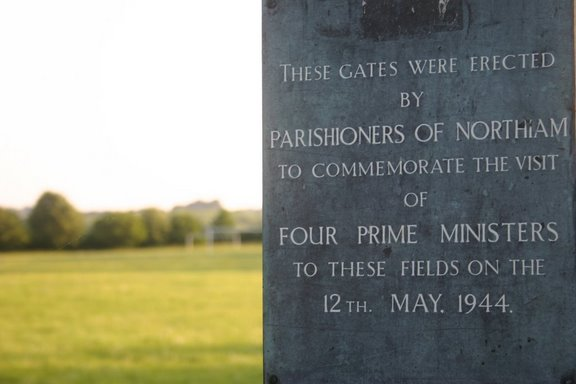
Four Prime Ministers Plaque

On 12 May 1944, four prime ministers visited the troops in Northiam who were preparing for D-Day in Normandy. The village field gates were erected to commemorate the visit. The four prime ministers were:

- Winston Churchill (UK)
- Mackenzie King (Canada)
- Jan Smuts (South Africa)
- Godfrey Huggins (Southern Rhodesia)

== Notable people ==
- Joanna Lumley - Attended school in the village
- Christopher Lloyd - Owner and gardener of Great Dixter
- Neil Buchanan - TV Artist And Children TV Presenter
- Moreton Frewen
- Major-General James Johnston, OBE, MC - A senior British Army medical officer who lived in the village following his retirement
- John Andrews - (author) lives in the village
- Jeremy Hosking Major financer of the Vote Leave campaign and Conservative Party donor lives in the village.

== Road in London ==
A residential street in Woodside Park Garden Suburb, Finchley, North London is named Northiam—this follows the nomenclature of Woodside Park whereby nearly all streets in the suburb are named after villages, rivers and places in East Sussex.

== Amenities ==
=== Schools ===
There are two main schools in Northiam. Northiam Primary school is located at the southern end of the village. The school has had a new community sports hall built which is used by the school during the day and for community sporting clubs in the evenings and school holidays.

The second school is Frewen College which specialises in supporting young people aged from 7 to 19 whose education has been adversely affected by dyslexia, developmental coordination disorder, dyscalculia, or speech and language difficulties. Founded in 1910 at Rottingdean near Brighton, it relocated to Herefordshire in World War Two. In 1945, the number of pupils had grown to the extent that a return to Rottingden was not possible and so the school relocated to Brickwall House where it has remained to this day. It is believed that Frewen College is the oldest such school in the country.

=== UK's first green village ===
Northiam was in contention to be the UK's first green village, with plans for a biomass power station providing power to the whole village. The first application for planning permission was refused in 2009. Following significant local objection, particularly around concerns over increased lorry traffic, there was no biomass plant constructed.

=== St Francis Fields ===
The Blue Cross animal charity which ran a rescue centre within the village closed down around 2015. It had originally opened in the 1960s. The Blue Cross chief executive, Kim Hamilton had published this proposal via a press release on 26 January 2010. Following the vacation of the site there were several attempts by the charity to obtain planning permission for a large number of houses on the site. All of these proposals were refused by Rother District Council. As of January 2020 the land has been owned by the Parish Council on behalf of the villagers. It has been renamed St Francis Fields. It will now be used by the community as public open space, a stables and possibly craft areas. The site includes extensive fields and woodlands running through the heart of the village.

=== Public Houses ===
Northiam once had at least 5 public houses. The original Railway Hotel by Northiam Station is now an Indian Restaurant. The only existing public house is the Crown and Thistle (renamed The Muddy Duck), a privately owned Grade II* listed building, but it is currently unoccupied and in a neglected state. The site is located at the entrance of St Francis Fields and would have been of strategic planning importance had that land been redeveloped.

=== Chapel ===
Northiam Unitarian Chapel was built in 1810, superseding an earlier building, and remained in use as a Unitarian chapel until the early 21st century. It is now a house.

== Transport ==
The A28 road runs through Northiam en route from Hastings to Ashford. To the north of the village the A268 diverges eastward to Rye.

=== Footpaths ===
Northiam is fortunate enough to be located along the route of the Sussex Border Path. Northiam also has public footpath walks to Beckley, Newenden, Ewhurst Green and Staplecross. The local walking group Northiam Footpath Group set up in 1994 provides organised walks for local people while aiming to promote and encourage walking as a healthy, sociable and enjoyable form of exercise, while exploring the surrounding countryside in a safe manner, to keep footpaths open; maintaining the network of local and adjoining Public Rights Of Way.

=== Public transport ===
The nearest mainline train station is Rye. However the closest station is Doleham being 6.5 miles, but this station is not served by regular stopping trains. Hourly bus services (except Sunday) operate to Tenterden, Rye, and Hastings. The bus services are operated by Stagecoach in Hastings. The bus route 344 runs from Northiam (Coppards Lane) and Hastings, via Rye. Route 340/341 runs from Tenterden to Hastings via the Westfield and the Conquest Hospital. Similarly the bus route 2 runs between Hastings and Ashford International, passing through Westfield, Brede, Broad Oak, Northiam and Tenterden. The Kent and East Sussex Railway manages Northiam station which operates steam trains for tourists between Bodiam and Tenterden.

== Twin towns ==
- Calonne-sur-la-Lys, France
