= Northiam SSSI =

Protected area in East Sussex, England

Coordinates: 50.998°N 0.605°E

- Site of Special Scientific Interest
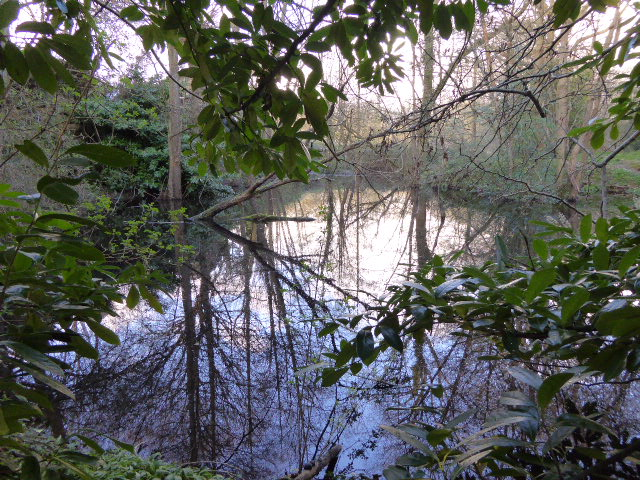
- Location of Northiam SSSI.
- Area of search: East Sussex
- Grid reference: TQ 829 253
- Interest: Geological
- Area: 0.3 hectares (0.74 acres)
- Notification date: 1998
- Location map: Magic Map

Northiam SSSI is a 0.3-hectare (0.74-acre) geological Site of Special Scientific Interest in Northiam in East Sussex. It is a Geological Conservation Review site.

This partly flooded former quarry is the type locality for the Northiam Sandstone Member of the Wadhurst Clay Formation, part of the Wealden Group which dates to the Early Cretaceous. It is important for the study of the paleogeography and paleoenvironments of the Wadhurst Clay Formation.

The site is private land with no public access.
