= Broad Oak, Rother =

Village in East Sussex, England

Coordinates: 50.949°N 0.598°E

Broad Oak
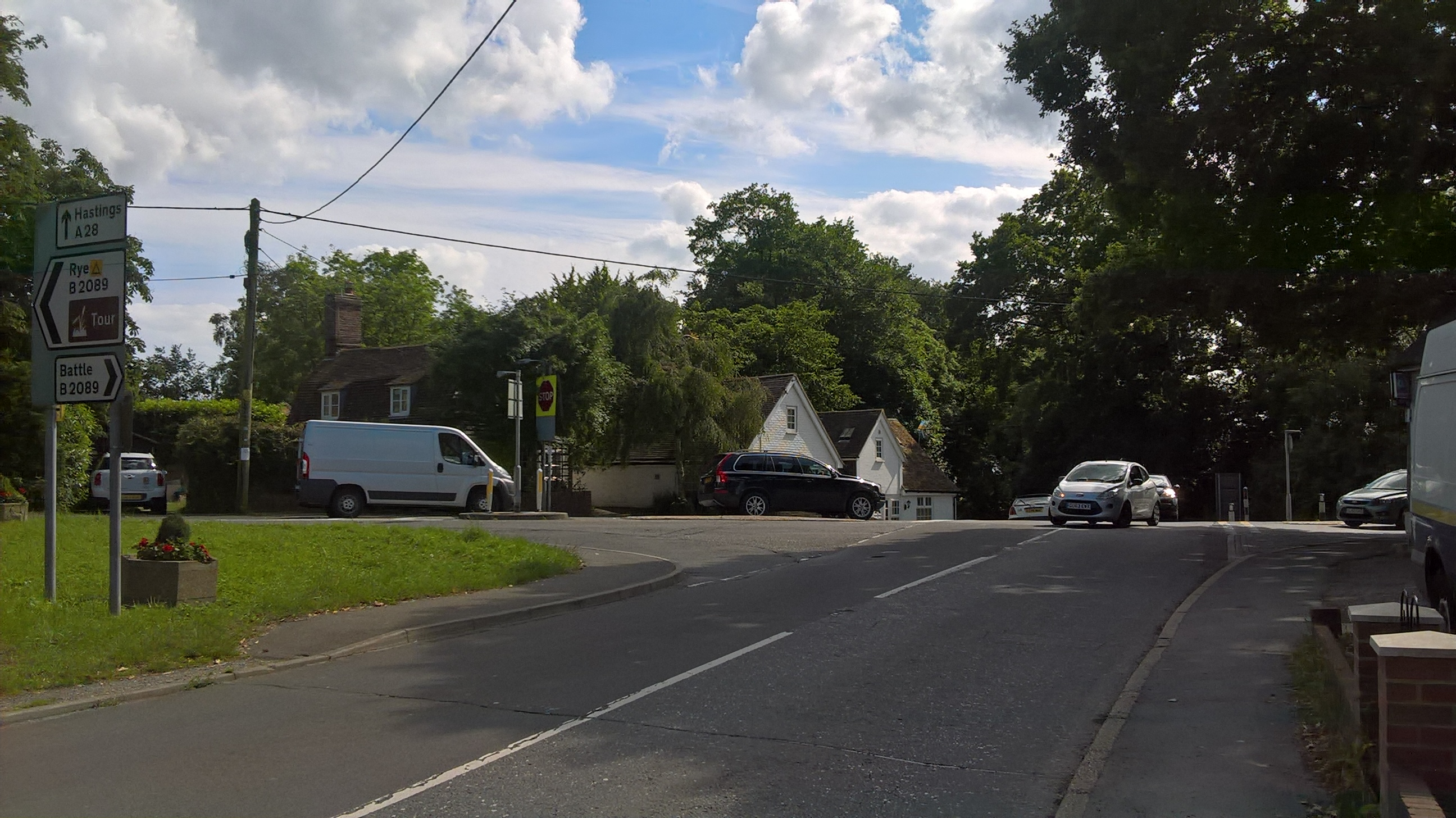
- The crossroads of the A28 and B2089 in Broad Oak

- Location within East Sussex
- Area: 0.7625 km^{2} (0.2944 sq mi)
- Population: 883 (2020 estimate)
  - Density: 1,158/km^{2} (3,000/sq mi)
  - London: 50 miles (80 km) NW
- District: Rother
- Shire county: East Sussex
- Region: South East
- Country: England
- Sovereign state: United Kingdom
- Post town: RYE
- Postcode district: TN31
- Dialling code: 01424
- Police: Sussex
- Fire: East Sussex
- Ambulance: South East Coast
- UK Parliament: Bexhill and Battle

Broad Oak is a small village in the Rother district, in eastern East Sussex, England, referred to also as Broad Oak Brede, as there is a village with the same name by Heathfield. In 2020 it had an estimated population of 883.

== Transport ==
The main A28 and minor B2089 roads meet at a crossroads in Broad Oak, with the destinations of Tenterden, Rye, Battle and Hastings.
