= Northiam Unitarian Chapel =

Church in East Sussex, England

- Northiam General Baptist Chapel
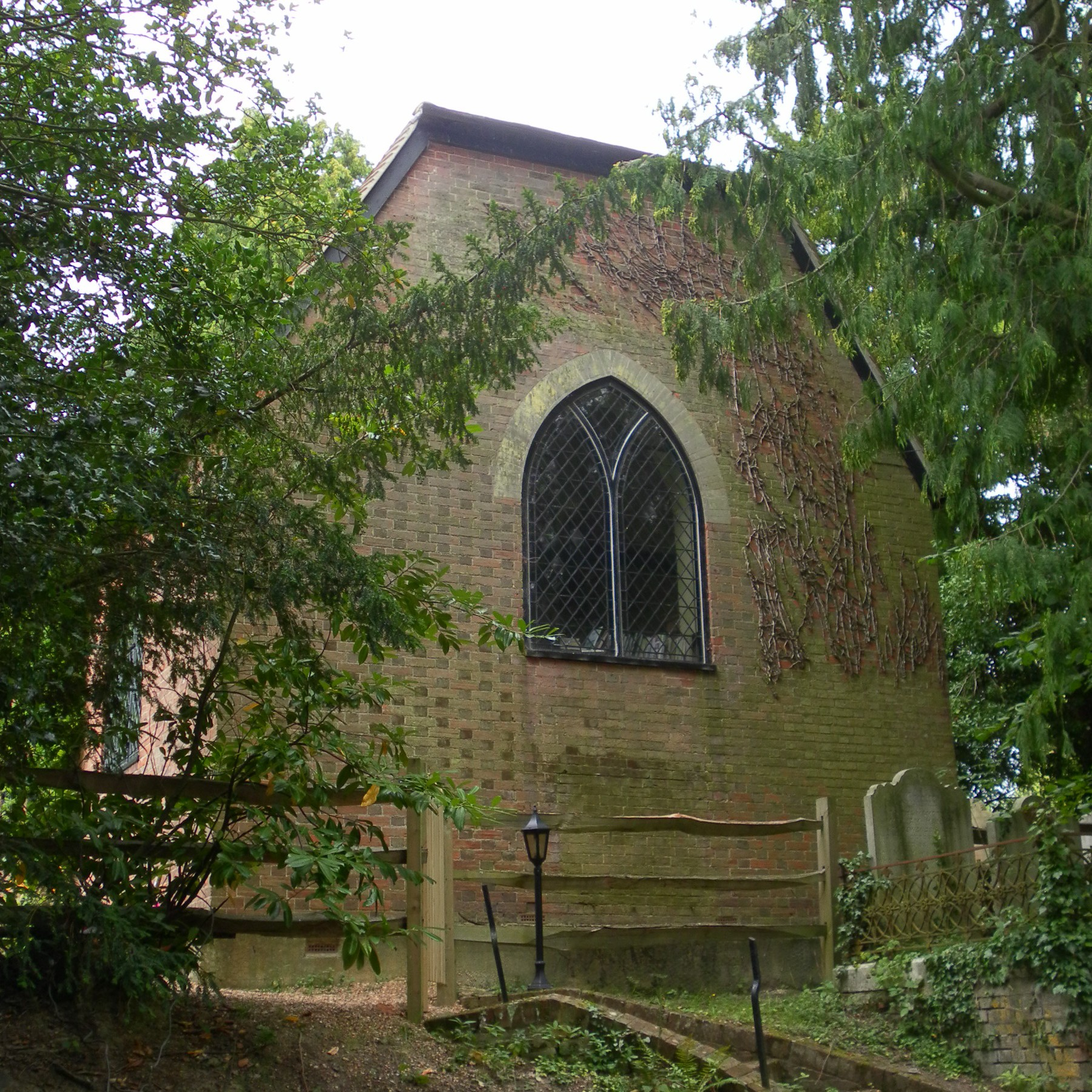
- The former chapel in July 2011

- Location within East Sussex
- 50°59′45″N 0°35′51″E
- OS grid reference: TQ 82377 25019
- Location: Dixter Road, Northiam, East Sussex TN31 6PF
- Country: England
- Denomination: Unitarian

History
- Status: Chapel
- Founded: 1795
- Founder: William Vidler

Architecture
- Functional status: Closed
- Heritage designation: Grade II
- Designated: 13 May 1987
- Years built: 1810 (present building)
- Closed: Early 21st century (by 2013)

Northiam Unitarian Chapel is a former place of worship for Unitarians in Northiam, a village in the district of Rother in the English county of East Sussex. Originally General Baptist in character when opened in a wooden building in 1795, its congregation came under the influence of William Vidler from nearby Battle—a former Baptist who had moved towards Universalism and Unitarianism—and adopted his views. The present building, which was converted into a house in the early 21st century, was erected in 1810 and was at various times served by ministers from Battle and Hastings Unitarian Churches and later, Tenterden. Historic England has designated it a Grade II listed building for its architectural and historical importance.

== History ==
George Gilbert, known as the "Apostle of Sussex", was an itinerant preacher of the mid- to late 18th century, known for his "strong character" and fervent Calvinistic views. He travelled regularly around the eastern half of Sussex preaching, and directly or indirectly founded about 40 churches along Calvinistic lines. One was in Battle, where William Vidler, born in 1758 to an Anglican family, came under his influence. He joined the newly formed independent Calvinistic cause and soon began preaching there. Vidler became a Particular Baptist in 1780, reconstituted the church along those theological lines and became increasingly popular as a preacher. He then underwent a further shift in his religious views in the early 1790s when he began to profess Universalist beliefs, which caused the church to split. This continued when he met the American theologian Elhanan Winchester, whose treatise Dialogues on Universal Restoration had caused Vidler to doubt his Calvinist convictions. From the mid-1790s he began to "ardently [promote] both Universalist and Unitarian views", and founded several Unitarian causes. One was in the village of Northiam, north of Battle, where a congregation which had begun to meet in a wooden chapel came under Vidler's influence and "adopted his religious outlook". The chapel had been registered in 1795 for General Baptists, and as such was one of several Unitarian chapels opened in southeast England for congregations who had moved from General Baptist to Unitarian beliefs around the turn of the 19th century. Others include Brighton Unitarian Church, also in Sussex, and Chatham, Cranbrook, Headcorn, Biddenden and Rolvenden in Kent. The original wooden chapel collapsed in 1810 during work to raise the building, and a new brick chapel was erected on its site.

For the 1851 religious census, the return was supplied by John Edwards, minister at the time. The name was given as "Unitarian Chapel" and the denomination as "Unitarian Baptists". Edwards described the chapel as being "built before 1800; rebuilt and enlarged 1810". There were 145 sittings, of which 95 were free (not subject to pew rents), and there was also standing room for 35 people. At the morning service on census Sunday, 13 worshippers and 11 Sunday School children attended; the afternoon service, which did not have a Sunday School, had 45 people in attendance. Evening services were sometimes held, and Edwards described the typical attendance as "from 20 to 30". The chapel was one of several Unitarian causes in the area, and in 1855 an anniversary tea was held there for the local Unitarian Christian District Association, when members of the Battle and Tenterden Unitarian chapels gathered. After the death of Edwards, the chapel closed for a time until the Kent and Sussex Unitarian Association supplied a new minister to serve both Battle and Northiam. There was then another period of closure, during which time the building became dilapidated, but in 1879 £130 was spent to install new flooring, pews, windows and a pulpit, and it reopened in June of that year, now served from Hastings Unitarian Church (which had opened in 1868). The chapel was still described as "Unitarian Baptist" at this time.

Under the name The Unitarian Chapel, it was listed at Grade II by English Heritage, the predecessor of Historic England, on 13 May 1987. This defines it as a "nationally important" building of "special interest". As of February 2001, it was one of 1,991 Grade II listed buildings, and 2,106 listed buildings of all grades, in the district of Rother. The chapel was still in religious use in 2004, but had closed and had been converted into a house by 2013. The small burial ground at the side survives. and was receiving ashes burials until at least the 1980s.

== Architecture ==
The former chapel is an example of the "simply-crafted", plain Unitarian chapels which were typically found in rural areas: "congregations of towns and more prosperous villages wanted something more appropriate", and many large, landmark chapels of advanced architectural quality were built in the 18th and 19th centuries in urban areas. It is a small single-storey building of brick with a two-window range on the southeast-facing front, each with three wide Gothic-style lancets. Between these windows is an arched doorway with a datestone above showing the date 1810. The brickwork is red and grey. On the rear (northwest-facing) wall there are two windows with timber frames, mullions and transoms. The mansard roof is tiled and half-hipped and has also been described as a gambrel roof—an unusual feature for a chapel.

The interior prior to closure and residential conversion was "very modest": a timber ceiling with open trusses, pine pews and pulpit, and a dado with original (early 19th-century) moulded panels. There was never a gallery. The internal dimensions were 39 1/2 by 19 feet (12.0 m × 5.8 m). The oldest monument in the burial ground dates from 1812 and has a terracotta plaque designed by Jonathan Harmer of Heathfield, who specialised in memorial plaques of this type for headstones and mausolea. Most of his work can be found in the area around Heathfield and Mayfield.

== See also ==
- List of places of worship in Rother

== Bibliography ==
- Antram, Nicholas; Pevsner, Nikolaus (2013). Sussex: East with Brighton and Hove. The Buildings of England. London: Yale University Press. ISBN 978-0-300-18473-0.
- Elleray, D. Robert (1981). The Victorian Churches of Sussex. Chichester: Phillimore & Co. Ltd. ISBN 0-85033-378-4.
- Elleray, D. Robert (2004). Sussex Places of Worship. Worthing: Optimus Books. ISBN 0-9533132-7-1.
- Hague, Graham; Hague, Judy (1986). The Unitarian Heritage: An Architectural Survey (PDF) (1st ed.). Sheffield: Unitarian Heritage. ISBN 0-9511081-0-7.
- Homan, Roger (1997). "Mission and Fission: the organization of Huntingtonian and Calvinistic Baptist causes in Sussex in the 18th and 19th centuries". Sussex Archaeological Collections. 135. Lewes: Sussex Archaeological Society: 265–282. doi:10.5284/1085045. ISSN 0143-8204.
- Stell, Christopher (2002). Nonconformist Chapels and Meeting-houses in Eastern England. Swindon: English Heritage. ISBN 1-873592-50-7.
- Vickers, John A., ed. (1989). The Religious Census of Sussex 1851. Lewes: Sussex Record Society. ISBN 085445-036-X.
