= Preston Circus Fire Station =

Fire station in Brighton, England

Preston Circus fire station
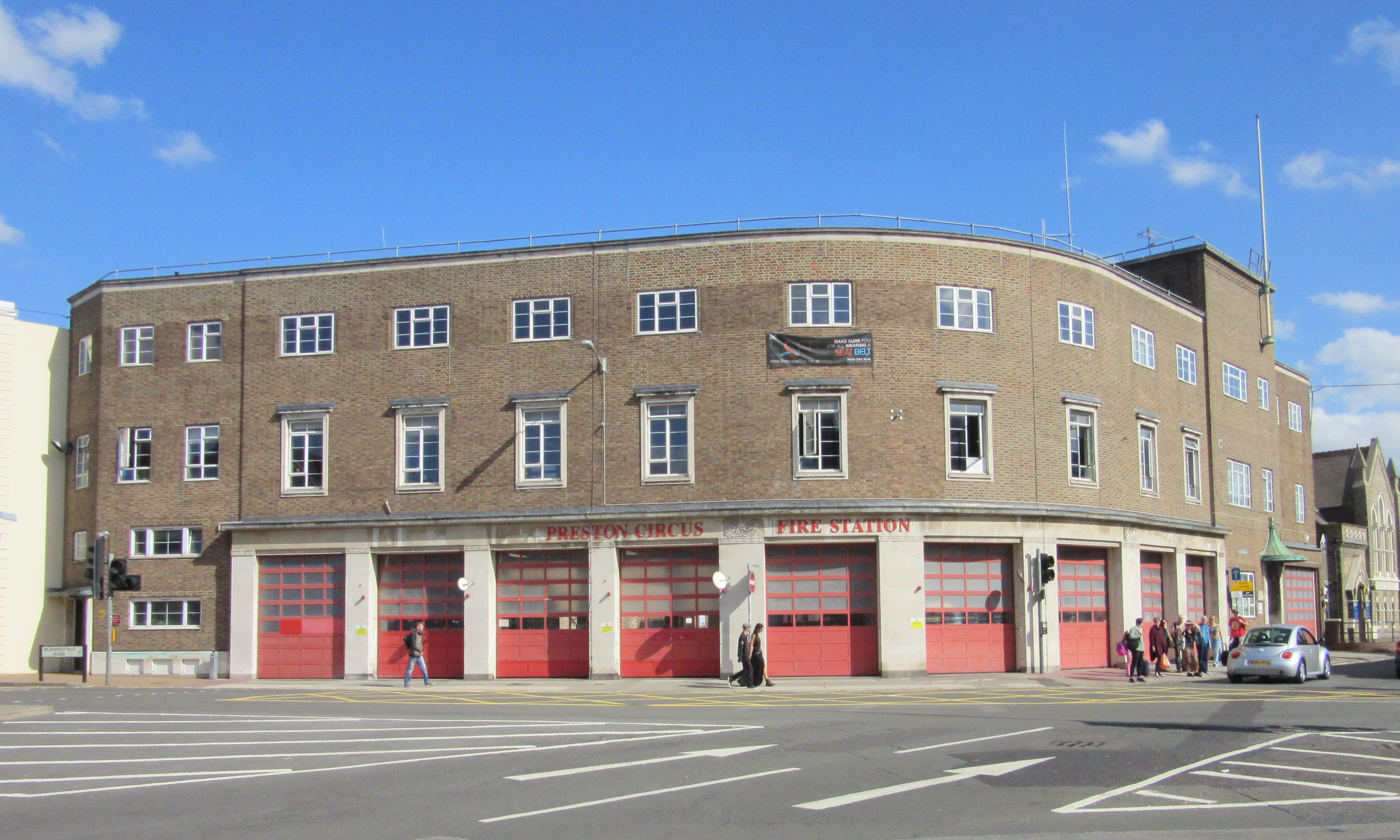

General information
- Location: Brighton, England
- Coordinates: 50°50′01″N 0°08′18″W
- Completed: 1938
- Client: Brighton County Borough

Design and construction
- Architect: Graeme Highet

Preston Circus fire station is an operational fire station and a historic building in Brighton on the south coast of England. It was built in 1938 as the headquarters of the Brighton County Borough Fire Brigade and is now a divisional headquarters for East Sussex Fire and Rescue Service (ESFRS). The site, a former brewery, was first used as a fire station in 1901. The present fire station was built when the fire brigade was professionalising and required larger, more modern accommodation. It has a curved, classical frontage in brick with stone details around the appliance bay doors. It was inaugurated on 21 May 1938. Following a local government reorganisation in the 1970s, the station became part of ESFRS and is its largest and busiest fire station. The building was earmarked for closure in 2009, but the plans were shelved. It underwent restoration and modernisation in 2024 and 2025. It is not a statutory listed building but appears on the city council's local list.

== Background ==
In the early 19th century, most likely the 1820s, a firm called Smithers established a brewery on the northeast side of the junction. It was later taken over by Longhursts and was renamed the Amber Ale Brewery. In 1901, Brighton Corporation founded a municipal tramway operation in the town. The brewery building was in the way of where some track had to be laid, and it was considered that the site would be suitable for a tram depot, so the Corporation bought the building and partly demolished it. It then became clear that the site would not bear the weight of the tram fleet, because the Wellesbourne stream ran underneath in a shallow culvert, so the depot was built on nearby Lewes Road instead. Of the remaining structure of the brewery building, the malt house was converted into the Duke of York's Cinema and the other section was converted into a fire station. The site benefited from the water supply from Wellesbourne and its proximity to main roads.

At the turn of the 20th century, the fire brigade was made up of a mix of voluntary firefighters and police officers who also attended fires. An on-street network of alarms was installed in 1910, along with bells in each firefighter's home, linked to the Preston Circus fire station. After a serious fire in December 1920, the volunteer system was found to be inadequate. Thus, in May 1921, the full-time Brighton County Borough Fire Brigade was established. Its headquarters were at Preston Circus, and it had 12 smaller stations throughout the borough.

== History ==
The original fire station was a small gabled building with a roof lantern, occupying a small part of the former brewery site. By the 1930s, it was no longer large enough, and in 1935, plans to rebuild the station and extend it to cover the whole site were approved. The new purpose-built fire station was inaugurated on 21 May 1938 in a ceremony led by Edward Turnour, 6th Earl Winterton.

The fire brigade was nationalised during the Second World War and became part of the National Fire Service until 1948. In 1974, as a result of local government changes, Brighton Fire Brigade became part of the new East Sussex Fire and Rescue Service (ESFRS), headquartered in Lewes, and Preston Circus became a divisional headquarters. It is the largest and busiest of ESFRS's fire stations. As of 2025, two fire engines and an aerial ladder platform are based there. In 2024, it received over 1,800 call-outs.

Among the incidents attended by firefighters from Preston Circus are the Brighton hotel bombing in 1984, the West Pier fire in 2003 and the Royal Albion Hotel fire in 2023.

In 2009, ESFRS published proposals to close Preston Circus, which it believed was outdated and too expensive to maintain, and sell the site to fund moving its operations to a modern purpose-built facility elsewhere in the city. The proposals were opposed by the Fire Brigades Union, the trade union which represents firefighters, which believed that they represented poor value for money and could compromise response times. ESFRS shelved the plans in 2010.

The fire station closed for refurbishment in February 2024 and re-opened in February 2025 after a £4.9-million modernisation, which included improved accommodation for firefighters and a new community room. Firefighters worked from a temporary base on Dyke Road during the closure. The re-opening ceremony was presided over by Mark Matthews, the chief fire officer of ESFRS.

Interior features highlighted by the restoration

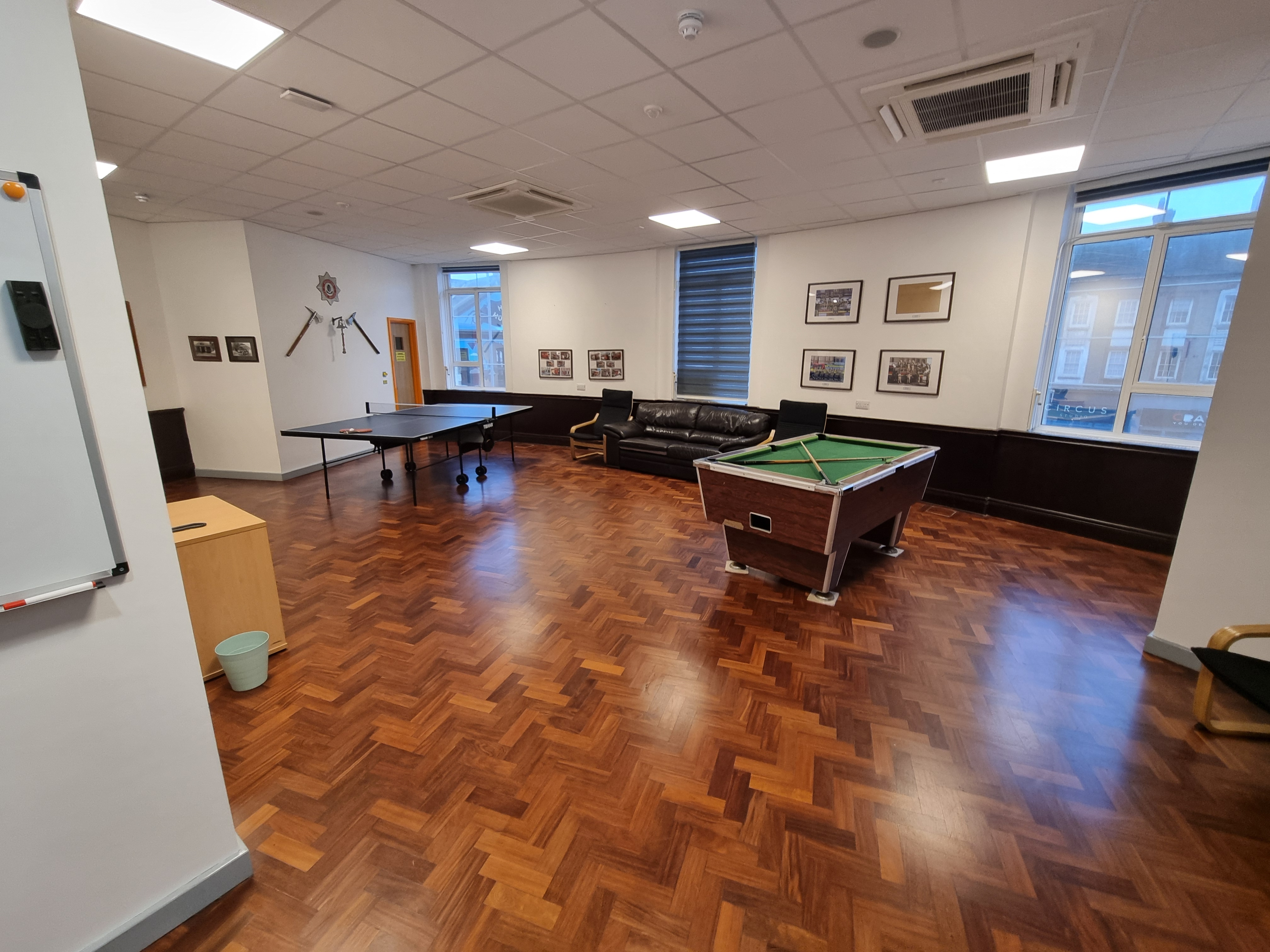

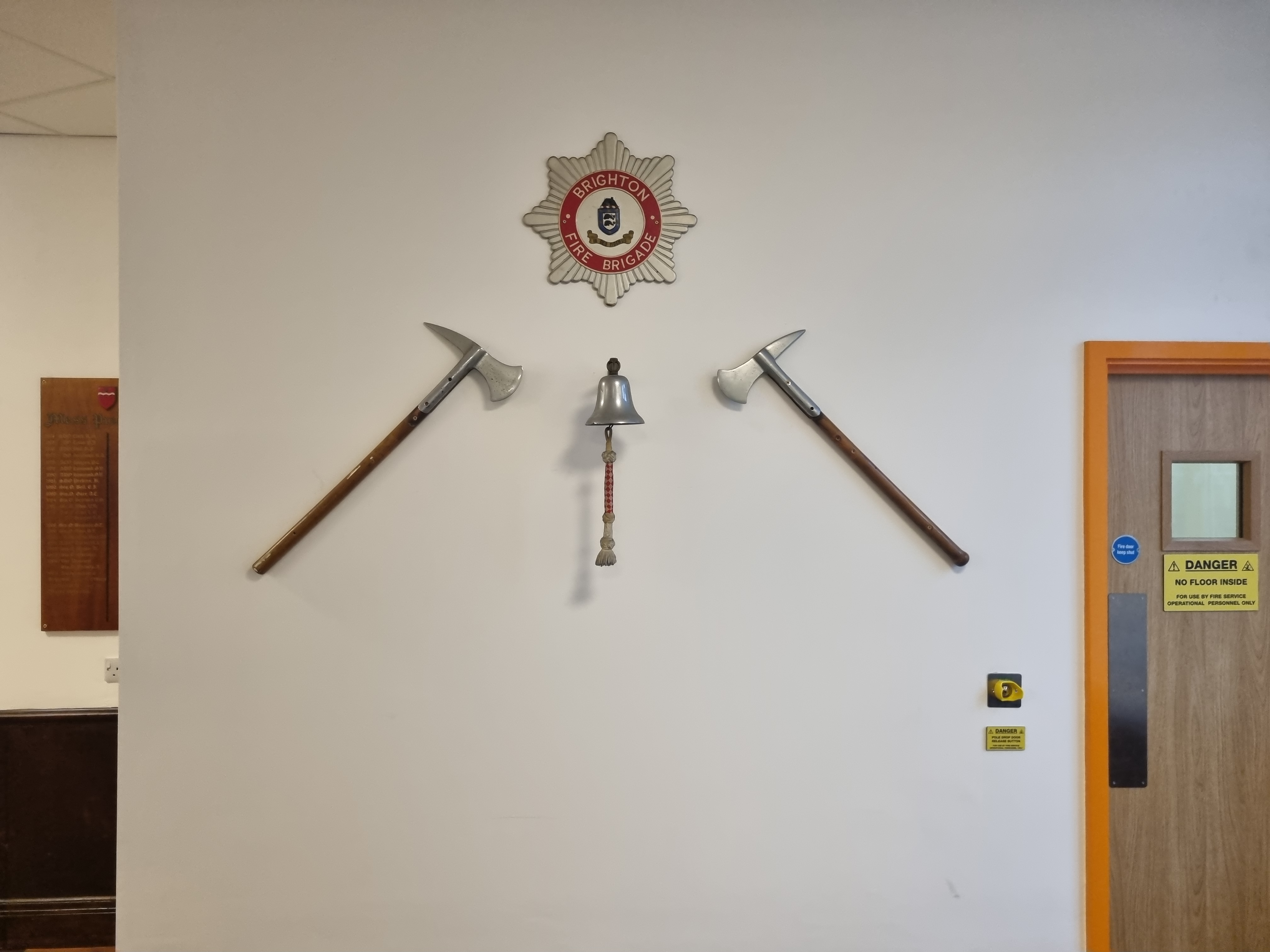

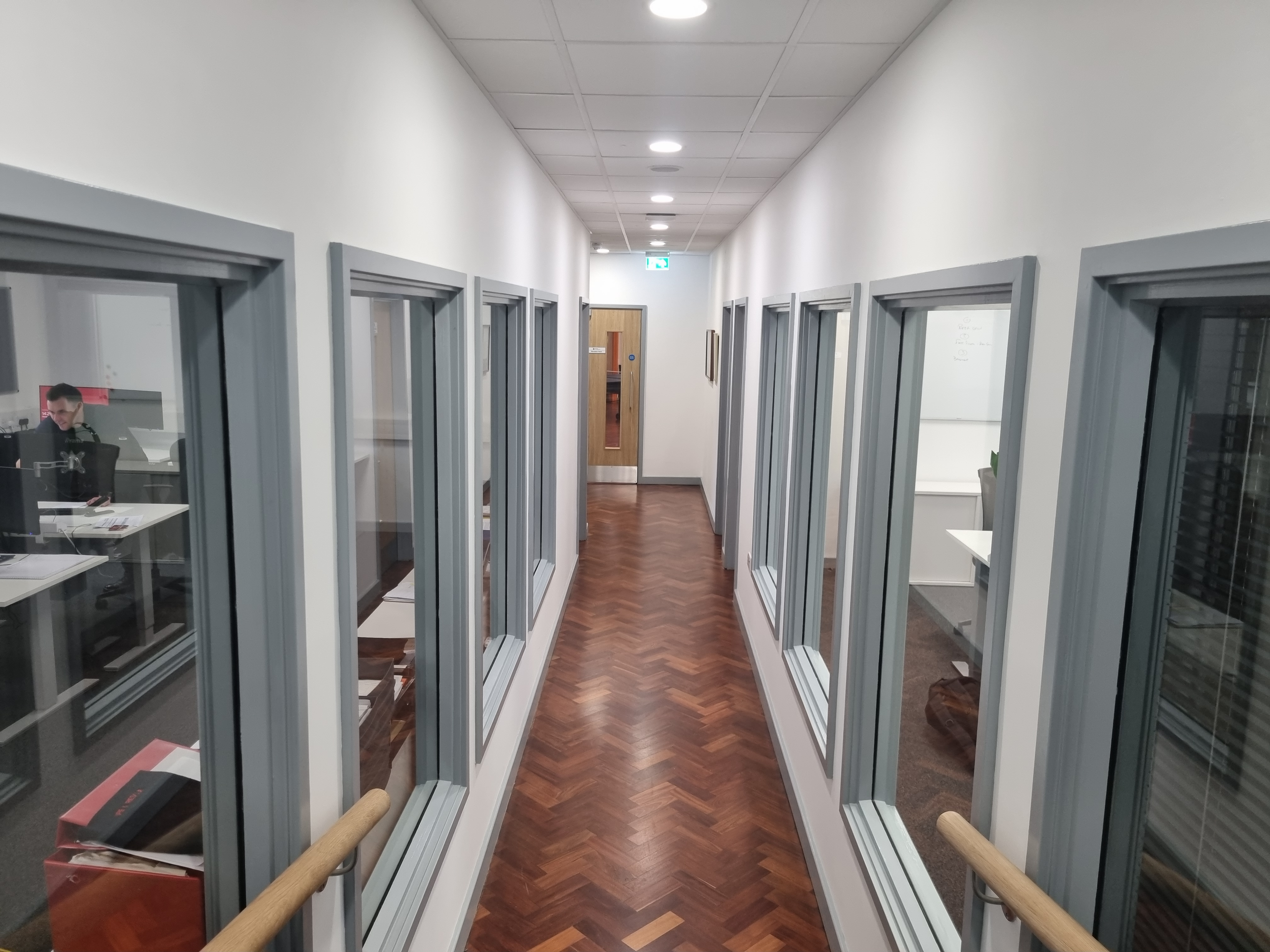

== Architecture ==
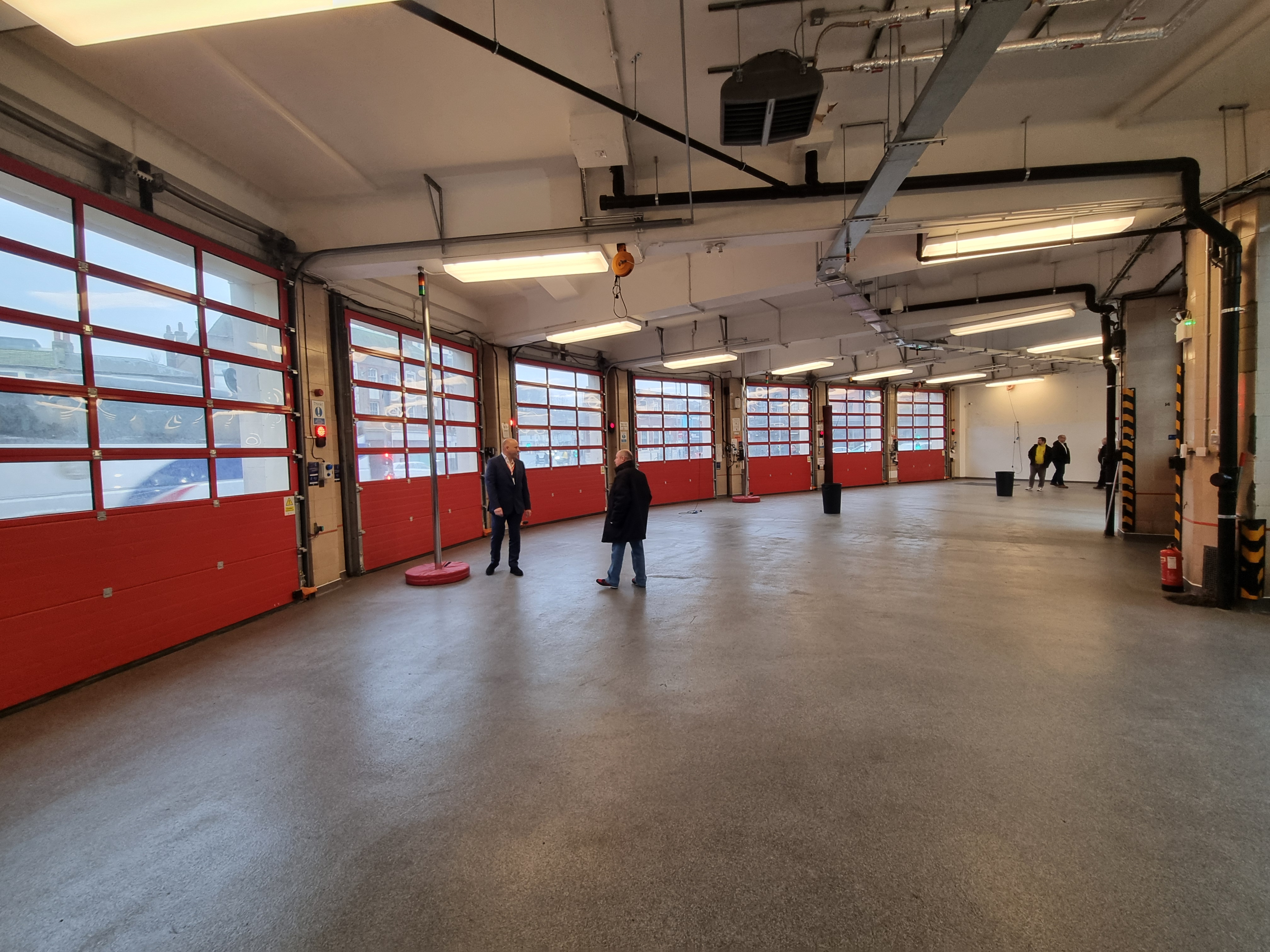
The interior of the appliance bay

The fire station is located on Preston Circus, a major junction in Brighton city centre where five roads meet, making it a prominent local landmark. It was designed by the architect Graeme Highet, who won the commission through a competition. It is built from brick and Portland stone in a restrained modernist style with some traditional details, such as a canopy over the staff entrance. It has a curved façade facing onto Preston Circus. The engine bay doors are surrounded by Portland stone, which is adorned with firefighting-themed reliefs by Joseph Cribb. The first-floor windows have traditional architraves, and there is a tented canopy above the pedestrian entrance. It is typical of large fire stations built in that era. Although the interior has been remodelled several times, some period features survive, such as parquet flooring and original staircases.

It appears on Brighton and Hove City Council's local list of heritage buildings. Its listing notes that it is the only example of a purpose-built fire station from the era in Brighton and Hove.

== Bibliography ==
- Antram, Nicholas; Morrice, Richard (2008). Brighton and Hove. Pevsner Architectural Guides. London: Yale University Press. ISBN 978-0-300-12661-7.
- Carder, Timothy (1990). The Encyclopaedia of Brighton. Lewes: East Sussex County Libraries. ISBN 0-861-47315-9.
- Collis, Rose (2010). The New Encyclopaedia of Brighton. (based on the original by Tim Carder) (1st ed.). Brighton: Brighton & Hove Libraries. ISBN 978-0-9564664-0-2.
- The London Road Social History Group (2010). London Road: Brighton's First Suburb. Glasgow: mac iD. ISBN 978-0-9564380-0-3.
- Toy, David (2016). Brighton's Buses and Trams. London: Capital Transport Publishing. ISBN 978-1-85414-390-7.
