= All Saints United Reformed Church, Burgess Hill =

Burgess Hill URC
- All Saints United Reformed Church, Burgess Hill
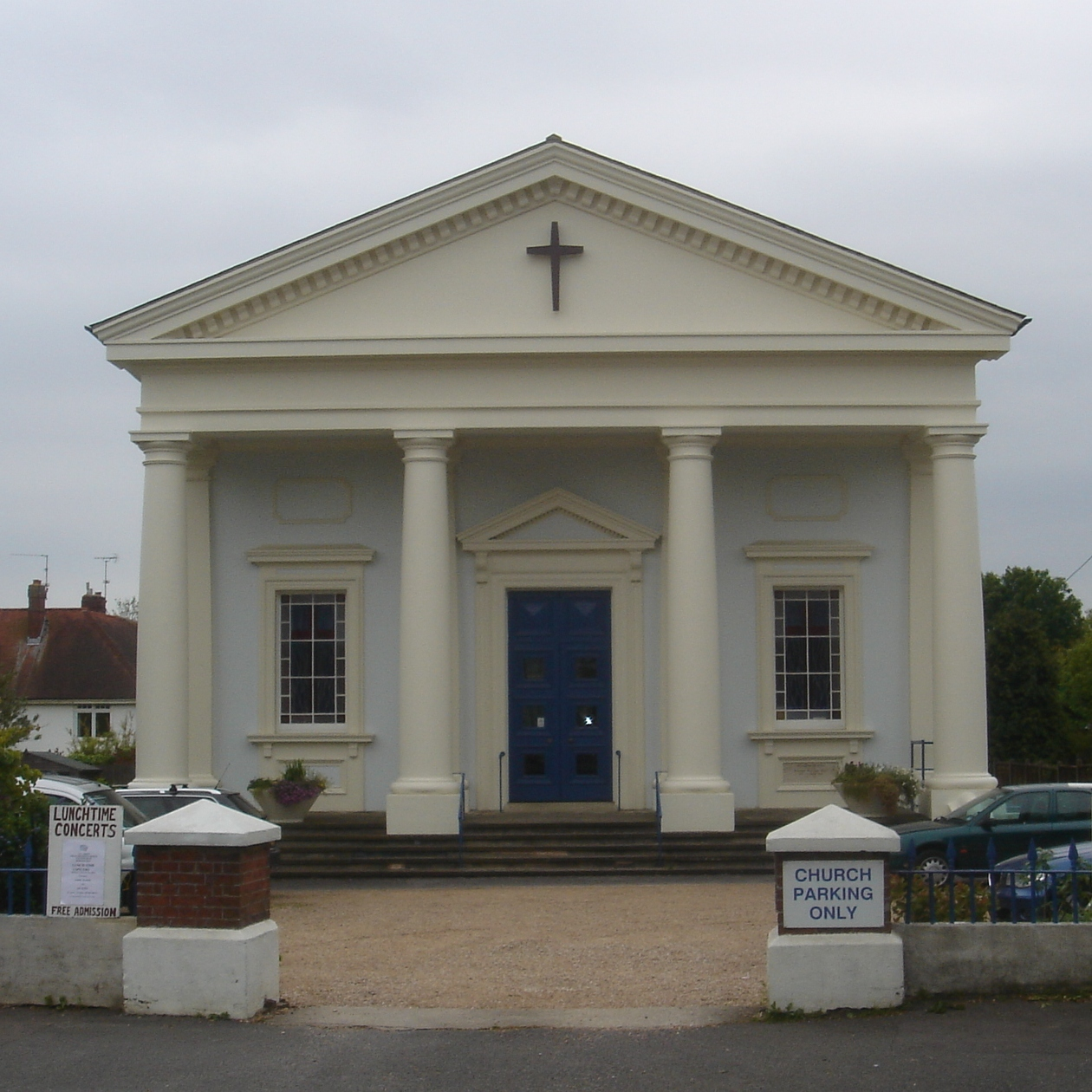
- Burgess Hill URC from the front

- Location in West Sussex
- 50°57′14″N 0°07′30″W
- Location: Burgess Hill, West Sussex
- Country: England
- Denomination: United Reformed Church

History
- Founded: 1881
- Dedication: All Saints

All Saints Church is the United Reformed Church in Burgess Hill. Originally a Congregational church, it replaced Burgess Hill's first Congregational chapel in Grove Road. It was registered as Junction Road Church.

It is a Classical building with a large portico and columns — an unusual style for such a late construction date (1881).

John Betjeman thought it was the Burgess Hill's only decent piece of architecture.

The exterior was painted in 1986, and the pews were removed in 2001.
