= Ewhurst Green =

Village in East Sussex, England

Coordinates: 50.992717°N 0.554724°E

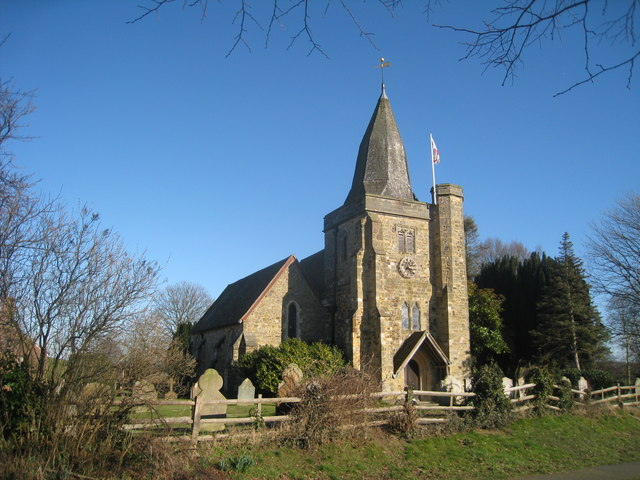
- St James's Church

- Location within East Sussex
- OS grid reference: TQ799238
  - London: 46 miles (74 km) NW
- Civil parish: Ewhurst
- District: Rother
- Shire county: East Sussex
- Region: South East
- Country: England
- Sovereign state: United Kingdom
- Post town: ROBERTSBRIDGE
- Postcode district: TN32 5
- Dialling code: 01580
- Police: Sussex
- Fire: East Sussex
- Ambulance: South East Coast
- UK Parliament: Bexhill and Battle

Ewhurst Green is a village and the main settlement of the civil parish Ewhurst, in the Rother district, in the county of East Sussex, England. It is located 10 miles (16 km) north of Hastings in the valley of the River Rother.

The parish church is dedicated to St James the Great and is Grade I listed. The church dates from the Norman period and has an unusually shaped spire. It also has a marble font, dating from the 12th or 13th century. The Rector of Ewhurst and Bodiam is The Reverend Canon Christopher Irvine, a former Canon Librarian and Director of Education of Canterbury Cathedral and a former Principal of The College of the Resurrection, Mirfield.

The public house in Ewhurst Green is The White Dog.
