= Bodiam =

Village and parish in East Sussex, England

Coordinates: 51.00°N 0.54°E

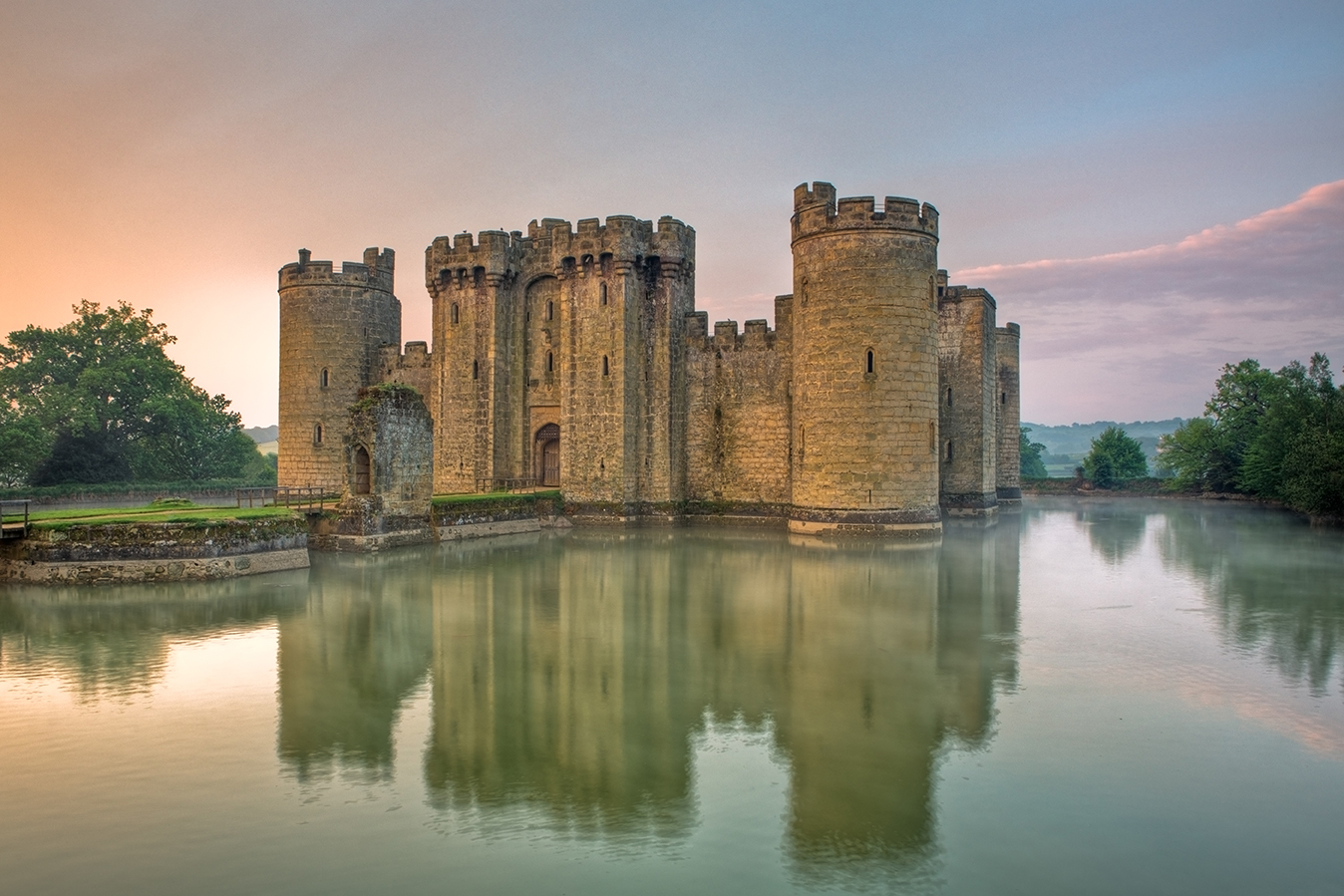
- Bodiam Castle

- Location within East Sussex
- Area: 6.5 km^{2} (2.5 sq mi)
- Population: 393 (Parish-2011)
  - Density: 156/sq mi (60/km^{2})
- OS grid reference: TQ783254
  - London: 45 miles (72 km) NW
- District: Rother
- Shire county: East Sussex
- Region: South East
- Country: England
- Sovereign state: United Kingdom
- Post town: ROBERTSBRIDGE
- Postcode district: TN32
- Dialling code: 01580
- Police: Sussex
- Fire: East Sussex
- Ambulance: South East Coast
- UK Parliament: Bexhill and Battle

Bodiam (/ˈboʊdiəm/; traditionally /ˈbɒdʒəm/]) is a small village and civil parish in the Rother District of East Sussex, England. It lies in the valley of the River Rother, near to the villages of Sandhurst and Ewhurst Green.

== Geography ==
South of the village of Bodiam and extending to the railway station is the site of a Roman settlement investigated in the 1960s. The site was located within the former Guinness hop gardens and the excavations were undertaken in between the rows of hops. A comprehensive landscape survey was carried out around 2016.

The village is on the line of the Roman road from Rochester to Westfield near Hastings. This road crossed the River Rother at the same position as the present bridge having approached from close to the parish church. At the Kent Ditch to the north at the County boundary the Roman road can be seen in the bank of the present watercourse outcropping as a solid layer of waste material from iron smelting,(slag). This had been recorded in the 1960s and re-examined by later fieldwork in 2000 by Neil Aldridge of the Kent Archaeological Society as part of a project supported by the Romney Marsh Research Trust. The extent of the road surface was found to be wider than previously thought and extends under the present road bridge.

Although famous for its castle, Bodiam was also in a main hop-growing area in the last century and was famous for growing hops for Guinness. Reginald B. Levett of Court Lodge Farm sold part of his land to Guinness to grow hops. A railway was built to provide transport for the hoppers, the Kent and East Sussex Railway (K&ESR), which is a tourist attraction. The village sits almost directly on the 51st Parallel and the same micro-climate that was so ideal for hops has been equally beneficial for the growing of wine grapes. Several local producers including Oastbrook Estates, are now producing English still and sparkling wines.

There is a 12th-century church, which contains a brass of a knight with the arms of the de Bodeham family, one of the first lords of the manor. Originally it was a port and crossing point from Battle to North Kent. During the medieval period a great moated castle Bodiam Castle, was built which is now a visitor attraction. There is a small range of houses, a pub (The Castle), and a restaurant (The Curlew).

=== Climate ===
Climate data for Bodiam (1991–2020)
Month	Jan	Feb	Mar	Apr	May	Jun	Jul	Aug	Sep	Oct	Nov	Dec	Year
Record high °C (°F)	14.0 (57.2)	16.7 (62.1)	21.1 (70.0)	22.8 (73.0)	26.7 (80.1)	27.8 (82.0)	31.7 (89.1)	32.1 (89.8)	28.9 (84.0)	25.6 (78.1)	17.2 (63.0)	14.4 (57.9)	32.1 (89.8)
Mean daily maximum °C (°F)	8.3 (46.9)	8.6 (47.5)	11.1 (52.0)	14.4 (57.9)	17.3 (63.1)	20.2 (68.4)	22.7 (72.9)	22.6 (72.7)	19.7 (67.5)	15.8 (60.4)	11.5 (52.7)	8.7 (47.7)	15.1 (59.2)
Daily mean °C (°F)	5.2 (41.4)	5.2 (41.4)	7.0 (44.6)	9.6 (49.3)	12.3 (54.1)	15.3 (59.5)	17.5 (63.5)	17.4 (63.3)	14.7 (58.5)	11.5 (52.7)	7.8 (46.0)	5.4 (41.7)	10.8 (51.4)
Mean daily minimum °C (°F)	2.0 (35.6)	1.7 (35.1)	2.9 (37.2)	4.8 (40.6)	7.2 (45.0)	10.3 (50.5)	12.2 (54.0)	12.2 (54.0)	9.8 (49.6)	7.3 (45.1)	4.2 (39.6)	2.1 (35.8)	6.4 (43.5)
Record low °C (°F)	−15.6 (3.9)	−11.1 (12.0)	−8.9 (16.0)	−6.1 (21.0)	−3.3 (26.1)	−1.1 (30.0)	3.3 (37.9)	2.2 (36.0)	1.0 (33.8)	−3.3 (26.1)	−8.5 (16.7)	−10.6 (12.9)	−15.6 (3.9)
Average precipitation mm (inches)	99.5 (3.92)	68.5 (2.70)	53.7 (2.11)	48.8 (1.92)	52.6 (2.07)	50.4 (1.98)	56.5 (2.22)	64.2 (2.53)	67.2 (2.65)	104.4 (4.11)	103.5 (4.07)	109.1 (4.30)	878.4 (34.58)
Average precipitation days (≥ 1.0 mm)	13.5	10.2	11.1	8.3	8.7	8.2	7.4	8.9	9.6	12.3	12.6	12.3	123.0
Mean monthly sunshine hours	57.6	74.8	117.1	169.4	204.4	205.8	208.5	203.8	152.2	110.0	67.8	52.6	1,624
Source 1: Met Office (precipitation days 1981-2010)
Source 2: Starlings Roost Weather

== Education ==
It has two schools: Bodiam Primary School, a state school, and Claremont Senior School, an independent. Bodiam Manor School went bankrupt in 2006; consequently Claremont Senior School took over at the start of September 2011.

== Notable people ==
Bodiam was the birthplace in 1881 of Miss A. E. (Ada Elizabeth) Levett, a leading medieval scholar and vice-principal of St. Hilda's College, Oxford. Levett was one of the first female professors of history in England, having been awarded a chair in history at Westfield College, University of London in 1929.

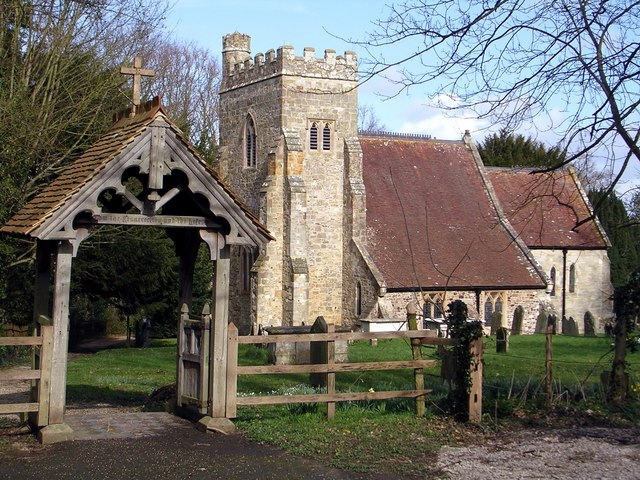
St Giles church
