= East Sussex Fire and Rescue Service =

Fire and rescue service in England

Operational area
- Country: England
- County: East Sussex

Agency overview
- Employees: ~800
- Chief Fire Officer: Mark Matthews

Website
- www.esfrs.org

East Sussex Fire and Rescue Service (ESFRS) is the statutory fire and rescue service for the county of East Sussex and city of Brighton and Hove, England. It is headquartered in Lewes. The service has a total of 24 fire stations.

== Performance ==
Every fire and rescue service in England and Wales is periodically subjected to a statutory inspection by His Majesty's Inspectorate of Constabulary and Fire & Rescue Services (HMICFRS). The inspection investigates how well the service performs in each of three areas. On a scale of outstanding, good, requires improvement and inadequate, East Sussex Fire and Rescue Service was rated as follows:

HMICFRS Inspection East Sussex
Area	Rating 2018/19	Rating 2021/22	Description
Effectiveness	Requires improvement	Good	How effective is the fire and rescue service at keeping people safe and secure from fire and other risks?
Efficiency	Good	Good	How efficient is the fire and rescue service at keeping people safe and secure from fire and other risks?
People	Requires improvement	Requires improvement	How well does the fire and rescue service look after its people?

== Fire stations ==
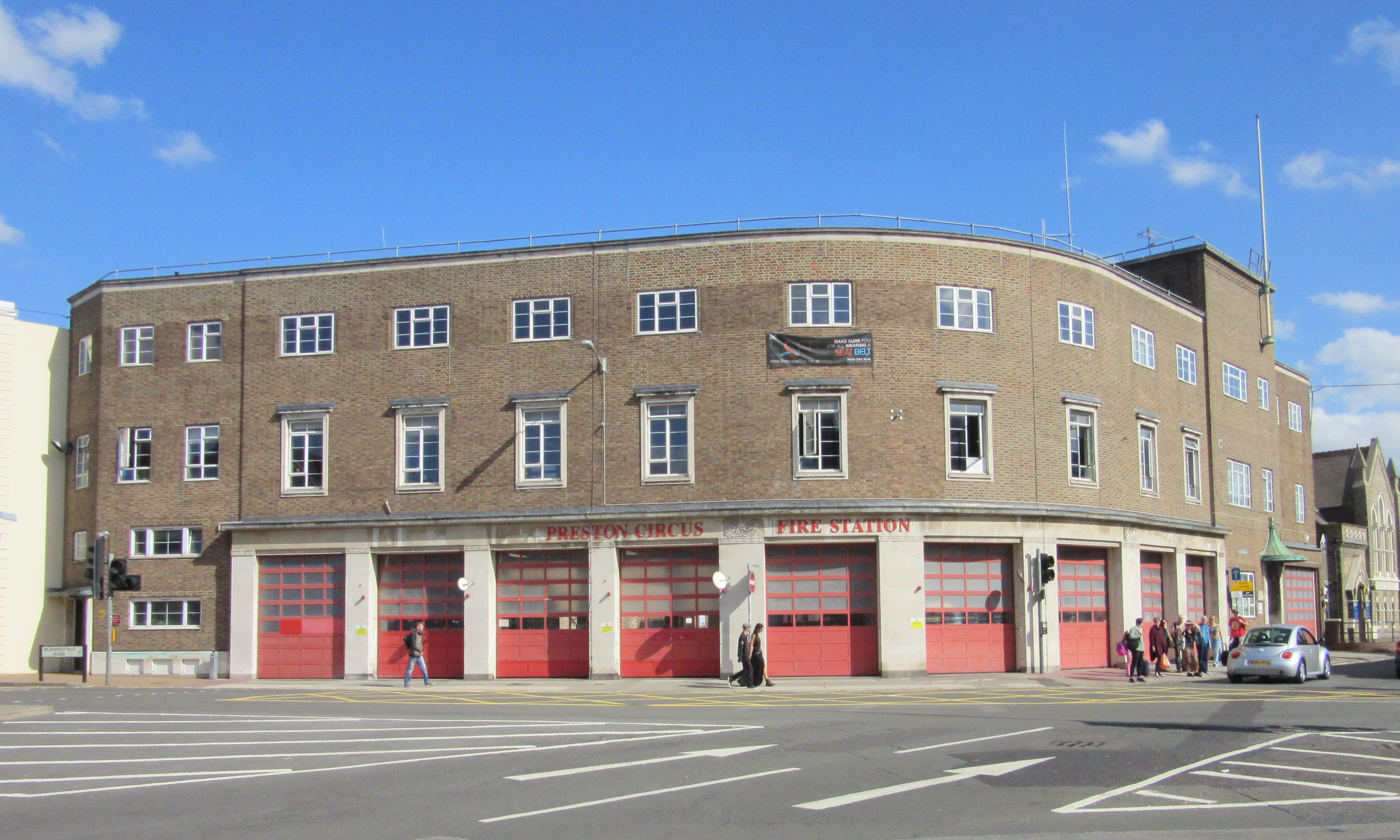
Preston Circus Fire Station

ESFRS operates 24 fire stations that are divided into three groups: West Group, Central Group, and East Group. Preston Circus Fire Station in Brighton is the largest and busiest.

The fire stations are crewed by wholetime firefighters, retained firefighters, or a combination of both.

== See also ==
- Fire service in the United Kingdom
- Smoke detector
- List of British firefighters killed in the line of duty

=== Other East Sussex emergency services ===
- Sussex Police
- South East Coast Ambulance Service
- Brighton Lifeboat Station
