= SE&CR Diagram 960 PMV =

Cavell Van
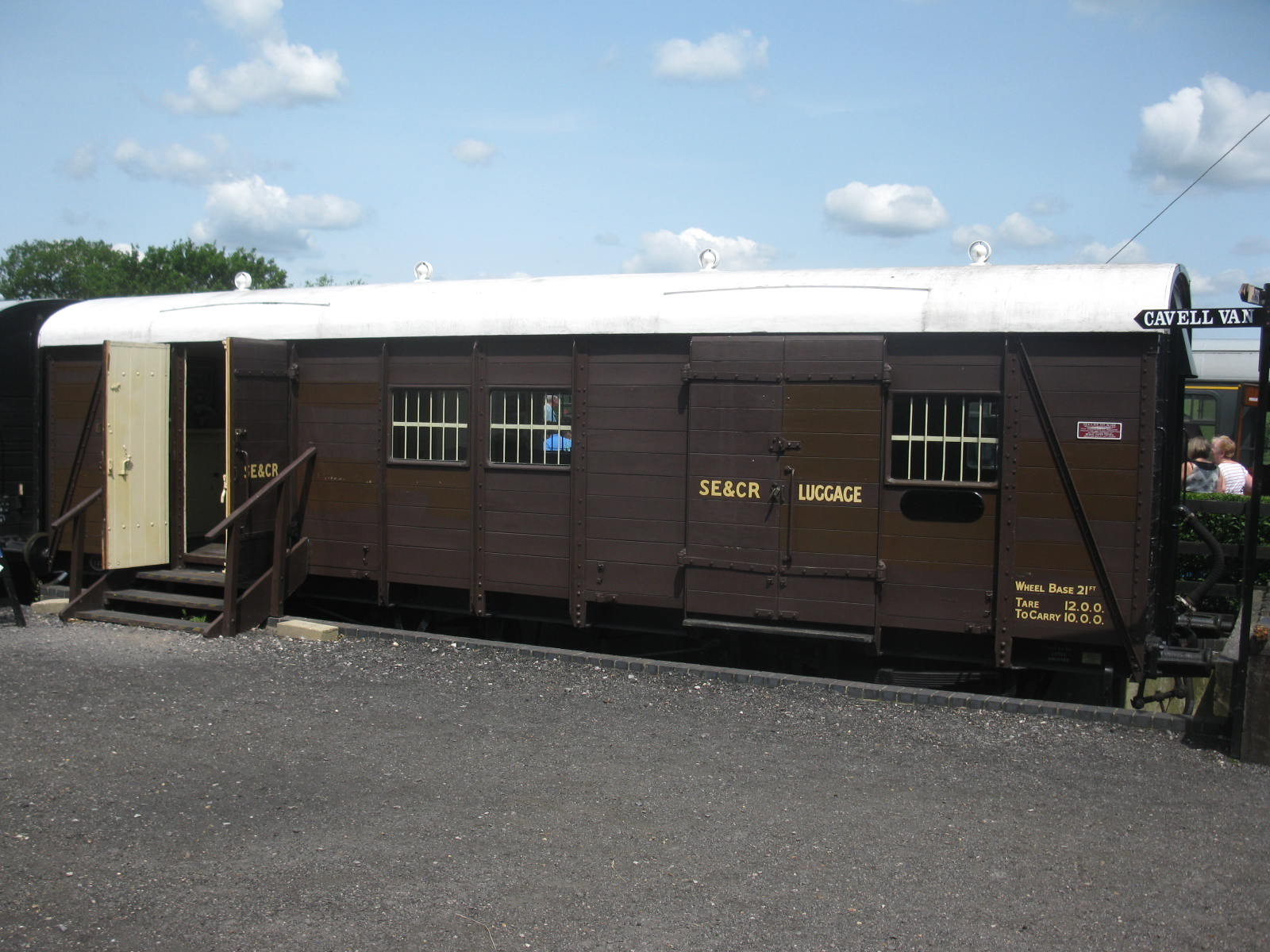
- The prototype van, preserved on the Kent & East Sussex Railway
- In service: 1919–1986
- Manufacturers: SECR Ashford Works (25); Bristol Carriage and Wagon Company (20); SR Ashford Works; SR Eastleigh Works; SR Lancing Carriage Works; BR Wolverton Works (50)
- Constructed: 1919–1951
- Number built: 979
- Capacity: 10 long tons (10.2 t)
- Operators: South Eastern & Chatham Railway; Southern Railway; British Railways (Southern Region)

Specifications
- Car length: Over body: 32 ft 0 in (9.754 m); Over buffers: 35 ft 10 in (10.922 m)
- Width: Over body: 7 ft 10 1/4 in (2.394 m); Over stanchions: 8 ft 4 1/4 in (2.546 m)
- Height: 12 ft 0 in (3.658 m)
- Wheelbase: 21 ft 0 in (6.401 m)
- Weight: 12 to 13 long tons (12.2 to 13.2 t) tare
- Braking system: Vacuum
- Track gauge: Standard

The Diagram 960 PMVs were a series of Parcels and Miscellaneous Van (PMV), previously designated Passenger Luggage Van (PLV), built by the South Eastern and Chatham Railway (SE&CR) from 1919. The prototype van was used to carry the bodies of Edith Cavell, Charles Fryatt, and The Unknown Warrior from Dover to London, and has been preserved by the Kent and East Sussex Railway. The SE&CR vans were known as the Cavell Vans for this reason.

The Southern Railway constructed a number of similar vehicles to Diagram 3103, and further batches were turned out by British Railways until 1951. Both types saw revenue earning service until 1986, with some examples remaining in departmental service into the following decade. Several examples have been preserved.

== Service history ==
The first PMV to Diagram 960 was built by the SE&CR at their Ashford Works in 1919, being numbered 132. A further 20 vans were built by the Bristol Carriage and Wagon Company in 1921, and 24 by the SE&CR at their Ashford Works in 1922. These took up vacant numbers between 121 and 182. All passed to the Southern Railway, who assigned them to Diagram 960; all were renumbered between 1925 and 1930, no. 132 becoming 1972, and the remainder became 1973–2016 in order of previous number.

SR Diagram	Quantity	Builder	Years	SE&CR numbers	SR numbers	Ref
960	1	Ashford	1919	132	1972	
960	20	Bristol Carriage & Wagon Co.	1921	121–5, 136–150	1973–92	
960	24	Ashford	1922	152–5/7/8/60–3/6–70/2–5/7/9–82	1993–2016	
3103	50	Ashford	1934–35	—	2181–2230	
3103	97	Ashford	1935	—	1154–1250	
3103	100	Ashford	1936–37	—	1054–1153	
3103	50	Ashford	1938	—	1921–70	
3103	148	Ashford	1939	—	1251–1398	
3103	100	Frames: Lancing; Bodies: Eastleigh	1940	—	1821–1920	
3103	120	Lancing	1942	—	1781–1820, 2091–2170	
3103	48	Lancing	1943	—	1053, 1692–1730, 2083–90	
3103	60	Ashford	1947	—	1501–60	
3103	111	Frames: Ashford; Bodies: Ashford, Eastleigh or Lancing	1950	—	1561–1671	
3103	50	Wolverton	1951	—	S1451S–S1500S	

The style of the panelling for the body sides and ends varied. All those built before 1939, plus nos. 1251–1358 built during 1939, had horizontal planking having a consistent width of 6 1/2 inches (170 mm). Those built in 1942 were similar, except for a single plank about half-way up, which was 3 1/2 in (89 mm) wide. Those built in 1950 had plywood panelling. The remainder, including nos. 1359–98 of 1939, had a style known as "wide and narrow": pairs of 6 1/2 in (170 mm) planks alternating with pairs of 3 1/2 in (89 mm). The doors were panelled in the same way as the body sides, except for the 111 vans with plywood bodies, which had doors of the "wide and narrow" pattern.

== Survivors ==
=== Diagram 960 ===
SE&CR 132, the Cavell Van

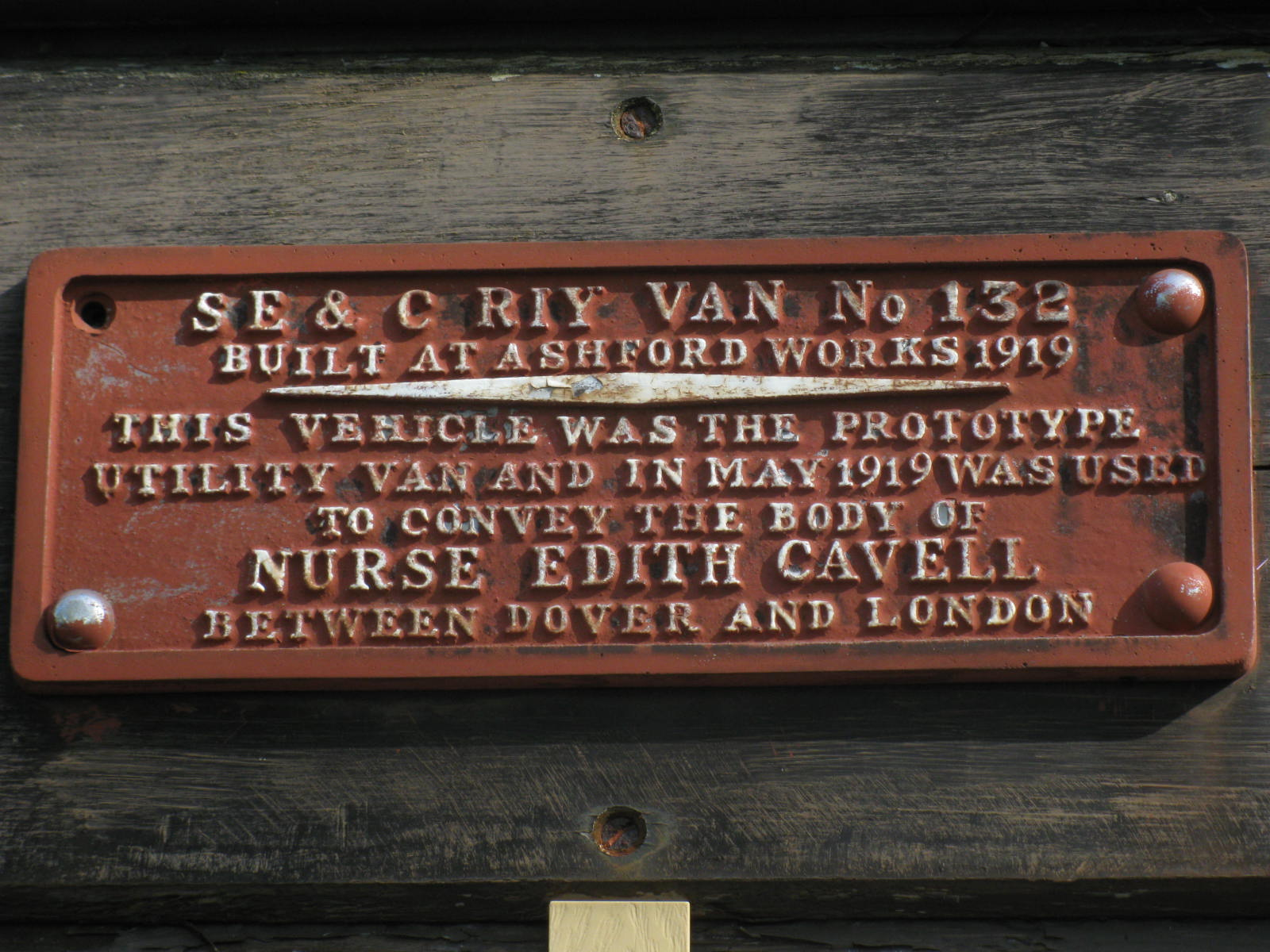
The plaque affixed to No.132

The prototype van, originally SE&CR No.132, has been preserved on the Kent and East Sussex Railway (K&ESR). It was built at Ashford Works in 1919. The van was used to carry the bodies of Edith Cavell and Charles Fryatt in 1919, and that of The Unknown Warrior in 1920. After it had carried Edith Cavell's body, a cast iron plaque was affixed to the body of the van. The van was numbered 1972 by the Southern Railway. In August 1946, it was transferred to Departmental Stock and renumbered 374S, being used to transport stores between Brighton Works and Lancing Carriage Works. The van was renumbered DS374 by British Railways and was later used as a Staff and Tool Van by the Power Supply Section of BR(S). In October 1967 it was renumbered again, to 082757 in the Internal User number series. It was withdrawn from use at Guildford Cable Depot and put into store at Hoo Junction.

The van was purchased by the Tenterden Rolling Stock Group and delivered to Wittersham Road on the K&ESR on 22 January 1992. It was restored and entered into service in SE&CR livery. The van was allocated number 93 on the K&ESR stock list. In 1994 it was moved to the Rother Valley Railway (RVR) where it underwent a change of ownership and deterioration in condition. In 2003 a K&ESR member purchased the van, and it was moved back to K&ESR in 2004. In December 2009, an appeal was launched for £35,000 to restore the van, with completion scheduled for November 2010, 90 years after it carried the body of The Unknown Warrior.

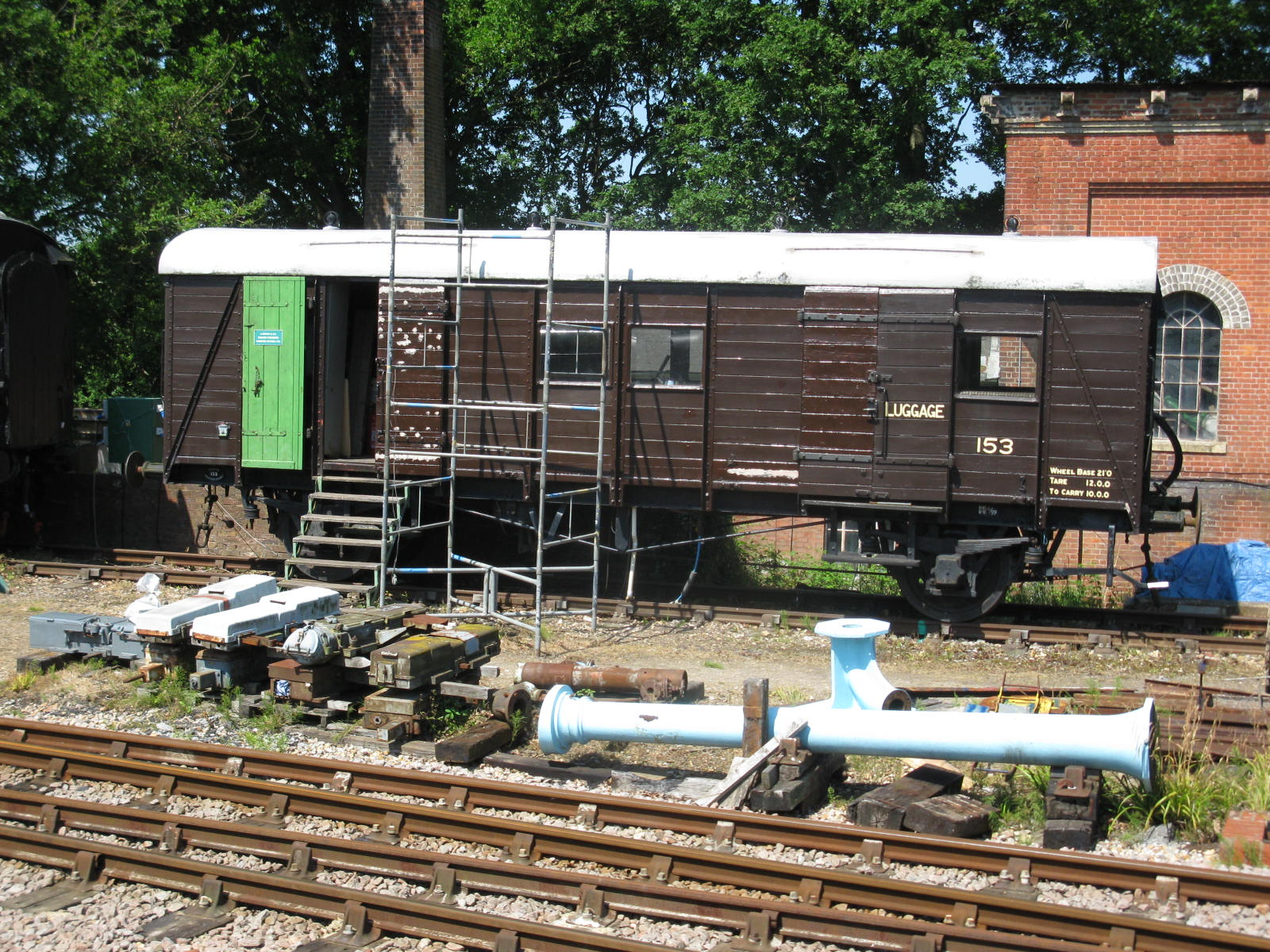
No.153 at Horsted Keynes

SE&CR 152

No.152 was built in 1922 at Ashford Works. It was renumbered 1993 by the SR and later renumbered DS747. In 1984 it was preserved by West Glamorgan County Council. The van is currently on the Gwili Railway where it is in poor external condition although it was reroofed in 2001. The van was scrapped in 2013.

SE&CR 153

No.153 was built in 1922 at Ashford Works. It was renumbered 1994 by the SR, becoming S1994S under BR(S) and then DS70031 and DW70031. It was purchased by the Bluebell Railway in 1973 and has been restored to SE&CR livery. Used as a Mess Van, it sees occasional operational use on the railway.

SE&CR 154

No.154 was built in 1922 at Ashford Works. It was renumbered 1995 and then DS792 by the SR. It was purchased in 1976 by the Mid Hants Railway.

SE&CR 155

No.155 was built in 1922 at Ashford Works. It was renumbered 1995 then DS70165. In 1962 it was converted to a Control Train Generator Van. After withdrawal, the body was grounded at Ashford Works Crane Shop. Purchased in 1994 by Mangapps Farm Railway Museum where it serves as a store.

SE&CR 177

No.177 was built in 1922 at Ashford Works. It was renumbered 2012 then DS1035. It was purchased by the K&ESR in 1990 and used as a breakdown train van. Withdrawn from service in 2005 as it was in need of extensive floor repairs. Later moved to the RVR at Robertsbridge. In 2013 moved to the Bluebell Railway.

=== Diagram 3103 ===
A large number of Dia. 3103 vans have been preserved.

Complete vans

First No.	Later Nos.	Notes
1153	S1153	Built at Ashford Works in 1936. Purchased in 1987 by the Great Central Railway. By April 2002 it had been transferred to the Nottingham Transport Heritage Centre. It was sold to the Avon Valley Railway in October 2007.
1162	S1162	Built at Ashford Works in 1936. Later renumbered S1162S and DS149. Purchased in 1988 by the Port Line Project, based on the Swanage Railway and outstationed on the Avon Valley Railway, now at Midsomer Norton railway station.
1184	S1184S; KDS164	Built at Ashford Works in 1936. Later renumbered S1162S and KDS164. Purchased in 1986 by the Bluebell Railway. Used as a mess and stores van at Sheffield Park.
1249	ADS160	Built at Ashford Works in 1936. Later renumbered ADS160. After withdrawal it was sold to Allied Steel and Wire from whom it was purchased in 1995 by the Vale of Glamoragan Railway Society. In 2009 moved to Spa Valley Railway.
1312	ARMY 47660	Built at Ashford Works in 1939. Sold to the War Department in 1940, served as ARMY 47660. Purchased from MODAD Long Marston in 1995. Used as a store on the Battlefield Line.
1333		Built at Ashford Works in 1936. Purchased c1981 by the Shackerstone Railway Society Ltd for use on the Battlefield Line. Has been used as a shop.
1455	S1455S; DB957669	Built by British Railways at Wolverton Works in 1951. Converted to air brakes in 1965. Used as Chief Civil Engineer's staff and tool van. Purchased by the Bluebell Railway in 2001 for its underframe. Still intact in August 2004.
1712	S1712	Built at Lancing Carriage Works in 1943. Later renumbered S1712. In use as a store at the Avon Valley Railway by the group restoring Battle of Britain class locomotive Sir Frederick Pile.
1788	S1788S	Built at Lancing Carriage Works in 1942. Purchased by the Bluebell Railway in November 1982. Used as a Mess Van.
1855	S1855	Built at Eastleigh Works in 1940. Purchased by the Bodmin and Wenford Railway post-1985.
1874		Built at Eastleigh Works in 1940. It was withdrawn from service in 1980 and sent to Woodham Brothers scrapyard, Barry. Purchased in 1988 by the Hartland Preservation Group, Derby. To Nottingham Transport Heritage Centre in April 1996 and then to Barrow Hill in November 1999. Owned by the Class 20 Group.
2142	S2142	Purchased in 1995, preserved at Bideford Station.
2158		Built at Lancing Carriage Works in 1942. Preserved on the Battlefield Line, In 2015 moved to the Epping Ongar Railway
2186	S2186S; KDS150	Built at Ashford Works in 1934. Purchased in December 1979 by the Maunsell Locomotive Society and kept at the Bluebell Railway.

Grounded bodies

First No.	Later Nos.	Notes
1544		Grounded body preserved at Blakemere, noted as due to be moved to Old Radnor.
1698	S1698	Built at Lancing Carriage Works in 1943. Later renumbered S1698 and given TOPS Code NQV. The grounded body is in use as a store at the Avon Valley Railway.
1728	938; S1728S; ADB977038	Built at Lancing Carriage Works in July 1943. Purchased by the Bluebell Railway in order to re-use the underframe. Body grounded at Sheffield Park.

Reused underframes

First No.	Later Nos.	Notes
1193	S1193S	Built at Ashford Works in 1935. Purchased by the Bluebell Railway for its underframe. Body scrapped, now carries LBSC 328 which is under restoration.
1233	S1233S; DS143	Built at Ashford Works in September 1935. Withdrawn in 1954. Purchased by the Bluebell Railway for its underframe. Body scrapped, now carries LCDR 106.
1507	S1507S; ADB977182	Built at Ashford Works in 1947. Purchased by the Bluebell Railway, underframe to be re-used for a four-wheel carriage.
1536	S1353S; ADB977183	Built at Ashford Works in 1947. Purchased by the Bluebell Railway for its underframe. Body scrapped.
1728	938; S1728S; ADB977038	Built at Ashford Works in July 1943. Purchased by the Bluebell Railway for its underframe. Carried restored body of LSBC 949 and now carries the restored body of LBSC 676.
1368	024671	Built at Ashford Works in 1939. In a derelict condition at Blakemere. Noted as due to be moved to Old Radnor. 2013 only underframe.
