= Charles Fryatt =

British mariner (1872–1916)

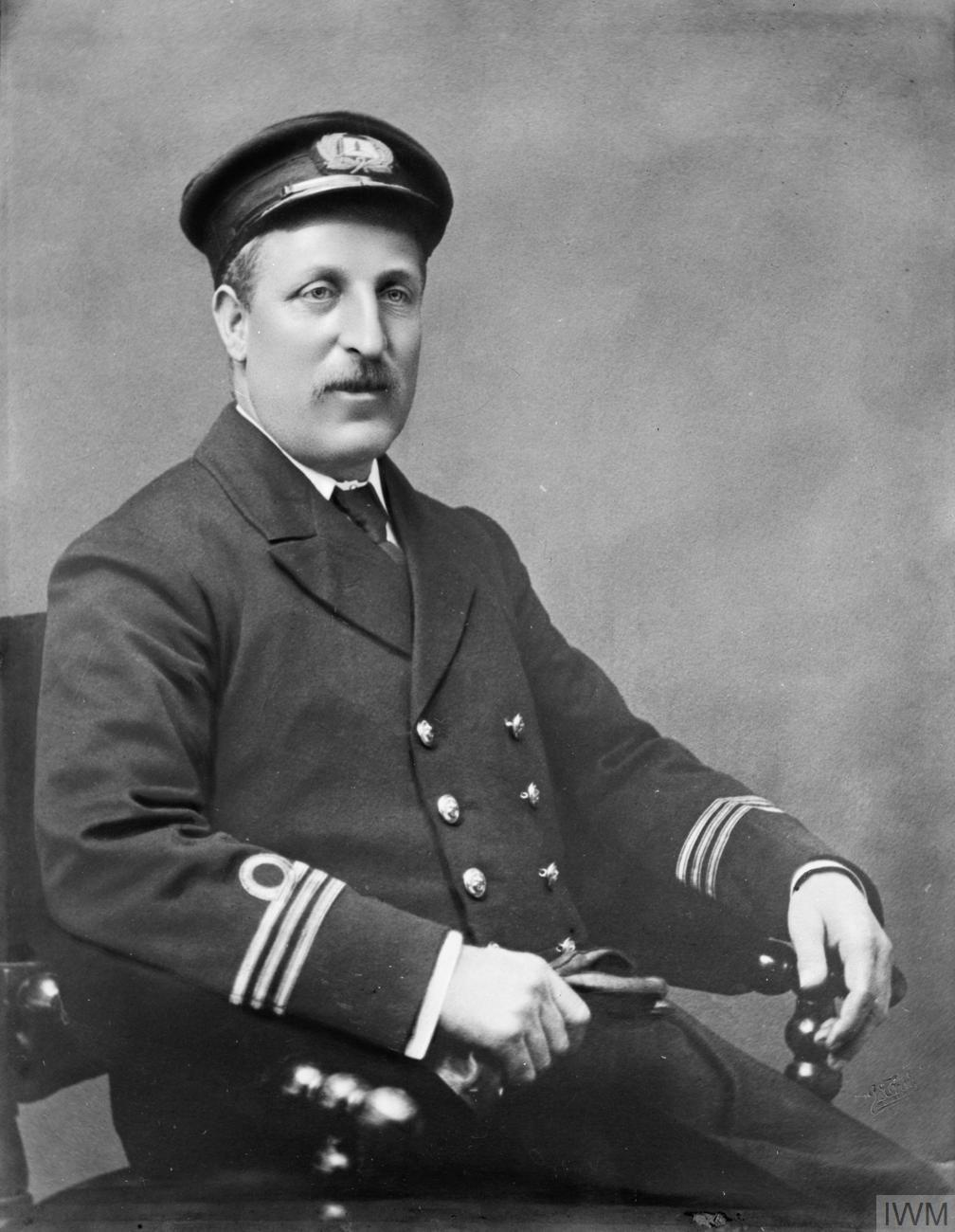
- Fryatt, c. 1914–1916
- Born: Charles Algernon Fryatt; 2 December 1872; Southampton, Hampshire, UK
- Died: 27 July 1916 (aged 43); Bruges, Belgium
- Cause of death: Execution by firing squad
- Occupation: Merchant navy captain
- Employer: Great Eastern Railway
- Known for: Attempting to ram U-33 during the First World War and being executed for that act.
- Spouse: Ethel Fryatt
- Children: Olive, Victoria, Doris, Vera, Mabel, Charles, Dorothy
- Awards: Order of Leopold (posthumous); Belgian Maritime War Cross (posthumous)

Charles Algernon Fryatt (2 December 1872 – 27 July 1916) was a British merchant seaman who was court martialled by the Imperial German Navy for attempting to ram a German U-boat in 1915. When his ship, the SS Brussels, was captured by the Germans off occupied Belgium in 1916, Captain Fryatt was court-martialled under German military law and sentenced to death for "illegal civilian warfare". He was executed by firing squad near Bruges, Belgium. In 1919, his body was reburied with honours in the United Kingdom.

== Early life ==
Fryatt was born on 2 December 1872 in Southampton, the son of Charles and Mary Fryatt. He attended Freemantle School during the late 1870s. In 1881, Fryatt's family lived at 22 Trinity Terrace, in St Mary's, Southampton, but later relocated to Harwich, Essex where he attended the Corporation School. He and his wife, Ethel Fryatt, had seven children; six girls and one boy. The children were Olive, Victoria, Doris, Vera, Mabel, Charles and Dorothy. The younger Charles later followed his father into the merchant navy, training at HMS Worcester.

After ending school, Fryatt joined the Mercantile Marine, serving on SS County Antrim, SS Ellenbank, SS Marmion and SS Harrogate. In 1892, Fryatt joined the Great Eastern Railway as a seaman on SS Ipswich. Fryatt's father had been the First Officer on SS Cambridge. Fryatt was promoted through the ranks, serving on various ships. His first command was SS Colchester. In 1913, he was appointed master of SS Newmarket.

== U-boat attack ==
On 3 March 1915, Fryatt's command, SS Wrexham, a Great Central Railway ship, was attacked by a German U-boat. The ship was chased for 40 nautical miles (74 km). With deckhands assisting the stokers, the vessel made 16 knots (30 km/h) when it would normally have been difficult to make 14 knots (26 km/h). Wrexham arrived at Rotterdam with burnt funnels. The Great Eastern Railway presented Fryatt with a gold watch for this feat. The watch was inscribed Presented to Captain C. A. Fryatt by the chairman and Directors of the G.E Railway Company as a mark of their appreciation of his courage and skilful seamanship on 2 March 1915. Later that month he was in charge of Colchester when she was attacked unsuccessfully by a U-boat.

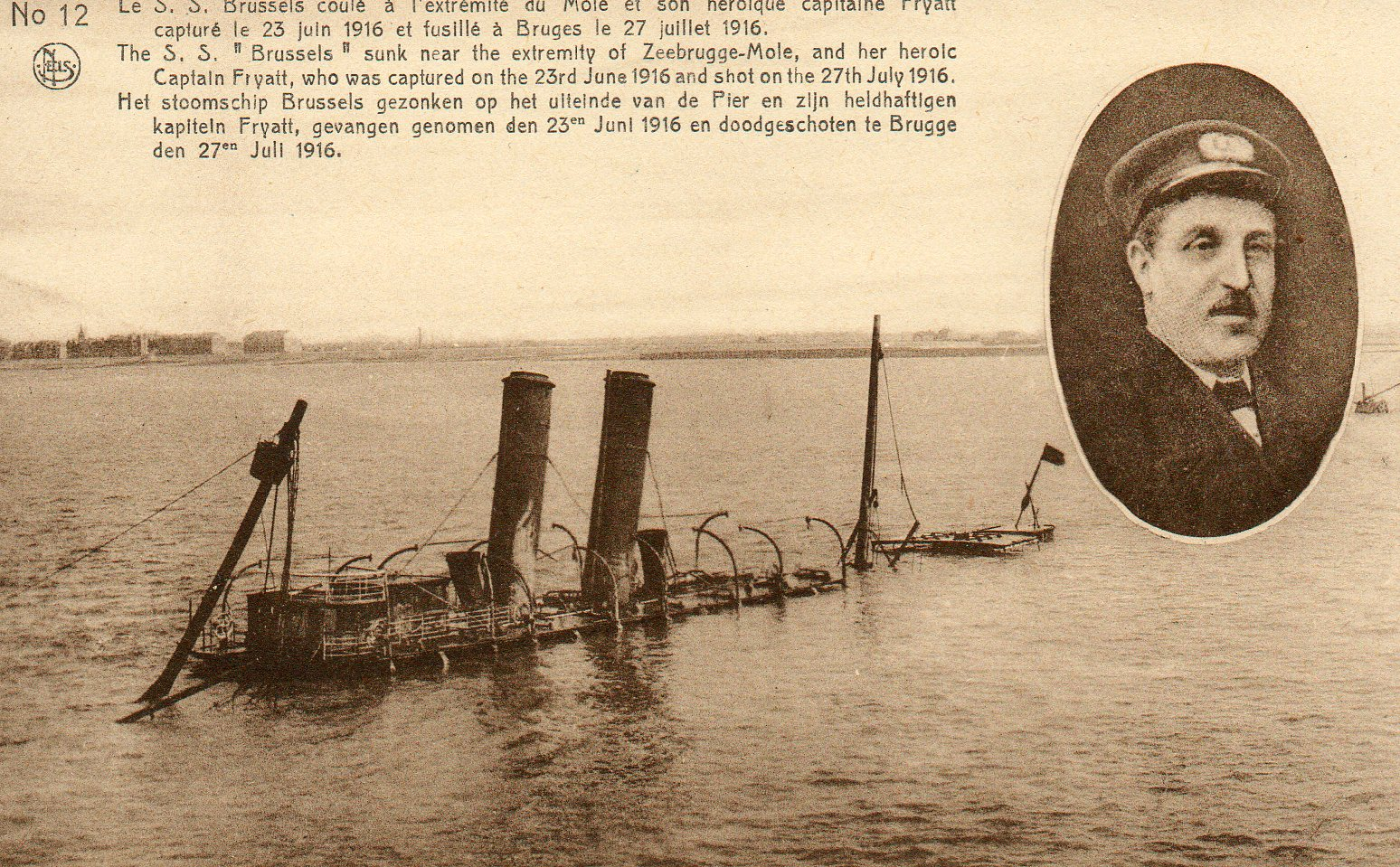
SS Brussels scuttled at Zeebrugge, October 1918

On 28 March 1915, as captain of the SS Brussels, he was ordered to stop by U-33 when his ship was near the Maas lightvessel. Seeing the U-boat had surfaced to torpedo his ship, Fryatt ordered full steam ahead and tried to ram U-33, which crash-dived. For this second action, Fryatt was awarded a gold watch by the Admiralty. The watch was inscribed Presented by the Lords Commissioners of the Admiralty to Chas. Algernon Fryatt Master of the S.S. 'Brussels' in recognition of the example set by that vessel when attacked by a German submarine on 28 March 1915. Fryatt was presented with a certificate on vellum by the Lords Commissioners of the Admiralty. He was also praised in the House of Commons.

== Capture ==
On 23 June 1916 (Note: Boats were seen 12:30 on 23 June, identified as German ships on 12:45 and entered Zeebrudge harbour at 5:30 on 23 June.) Brussels left Hook of Holland bound for Harwich. Lights were shown from the beach and a flare was fired. A passenger is reported to have remained on deck and signalled to shore. Five German destroyers surrounded Brussels. The passengers were told to prepare to take to the lifeboats and the ship's official papers were destroyed. Brussels was then captured by the Germans, the radio was destroyed, and it was escorted into Zeebrugge and then to Bruges.

== Court-martial ==
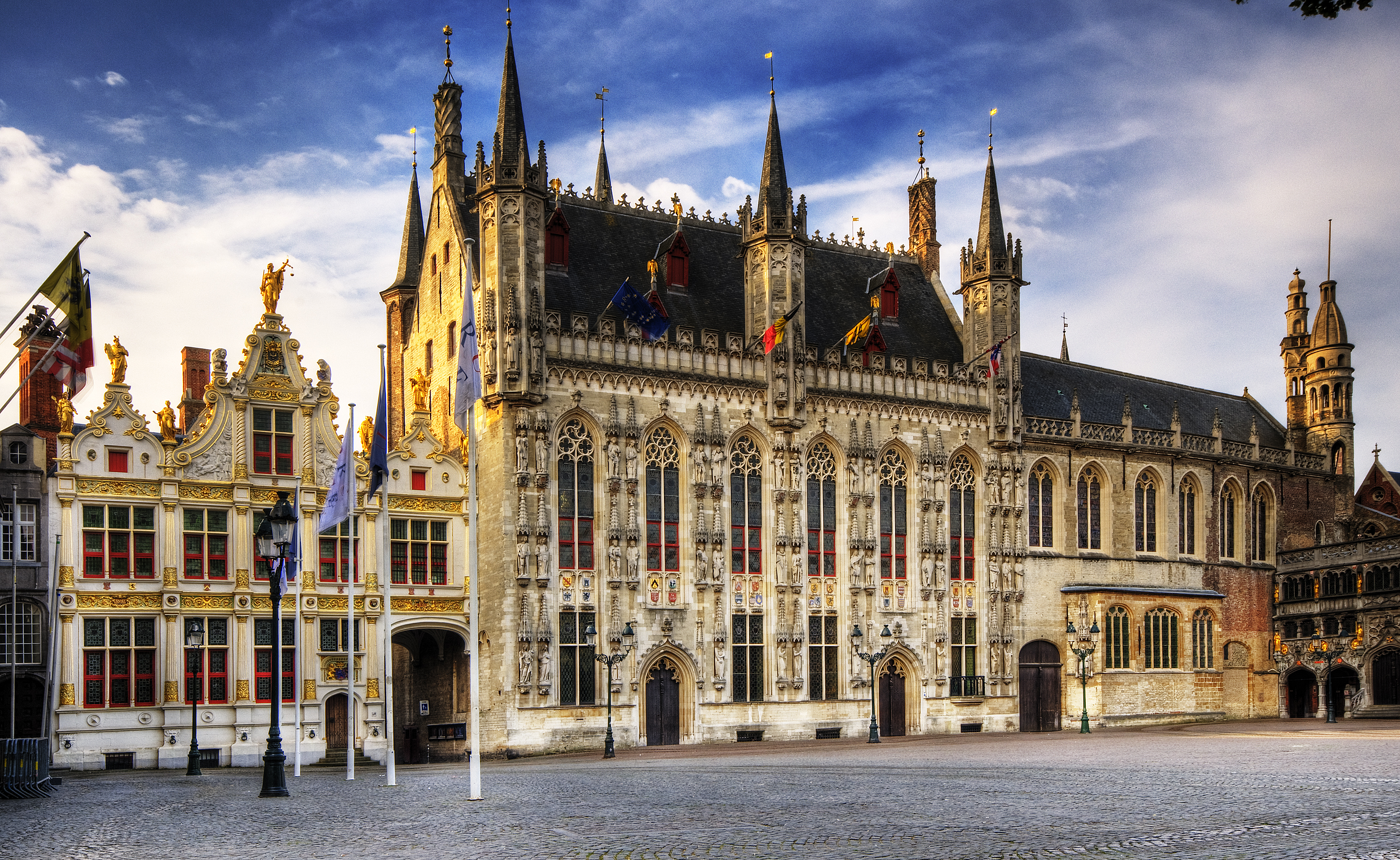
Bruges Town Hall, where Fryatt's court-martial occurred

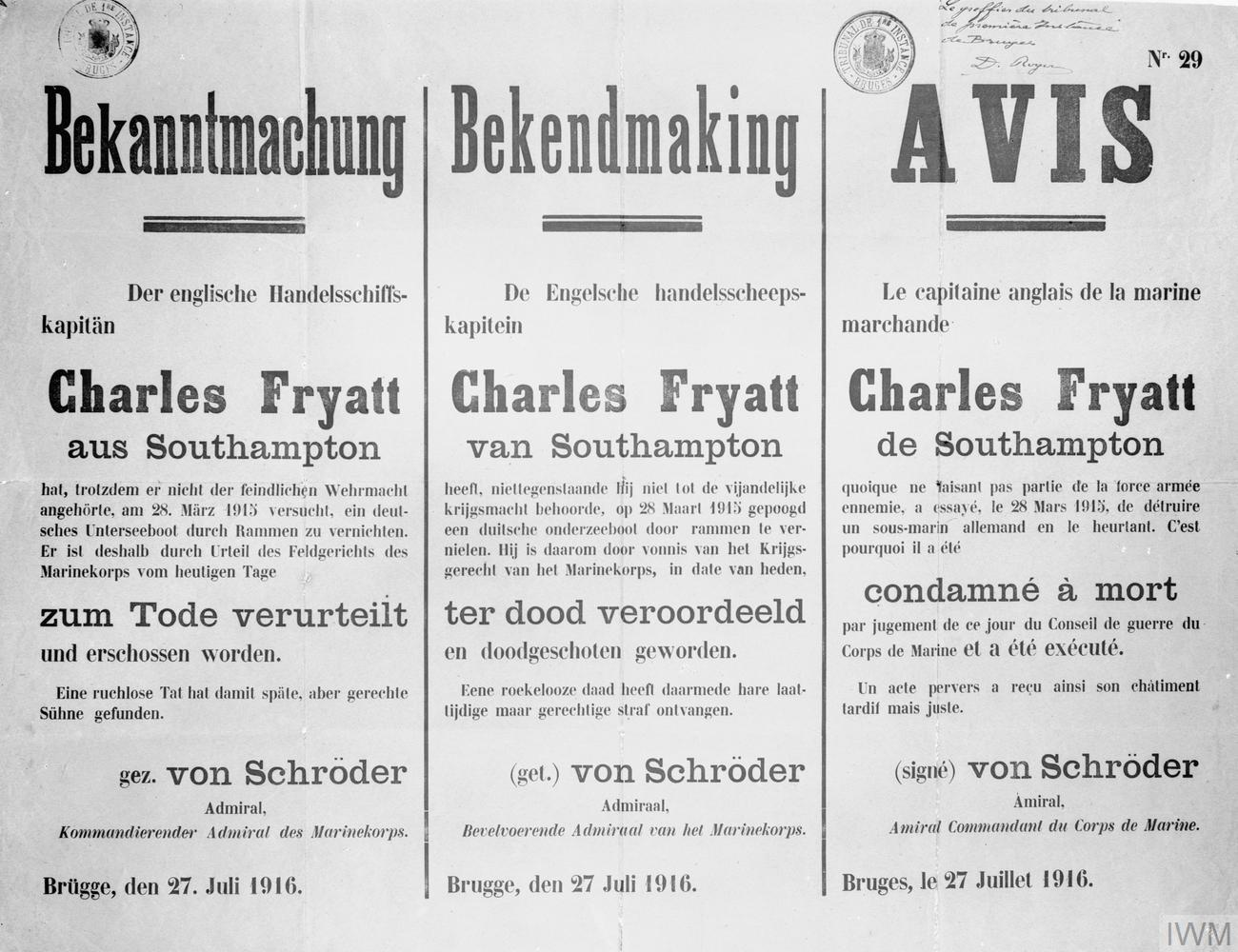
Notice of execution in German, Dutch and French

Fryatt and his crew were sent to the civilian internment camp at Ruhleben, near Berlin. On 16 July 1916, the Dutch newspaper De Telegraaf reported that Fryatt had been charged with sinking a German submarine. In reality, U-33 had not been sunk; at the time of the trial it was on active service as part of the Constantinople Flotilla. The basis for the charge was the inscription on his gold watch from the Admiralty. Fryatt was tried at a court-martial by the Imperial German Navy on 27 July 1916, at Bruges Town Hall. Captain Fryatt was found guilty of being a franc-tireur and sentenced to death. The sentence was confirmed by the Kaiser. At 19:00, Fryatt was executed by a naval firing squad at Bruges within the harbour grounds. The execution was witnessed by one of the town's aldermen. Fryatt was buried in a small cemetery just outside Bruges that was used for burying Belgian civilians executed after being convicted of offenses involving guerrilla warfare or perfidy. The grave was later visited by diplomat Sir Walter Townley (British Ambassador to the Netherlands from 1917 to 1919) and his wife.

An execution notice was published in Dutch, French and German announcing the death of Fryatt. It was signed by Admiral Ludwig von Schröder. A translation of the execution notice reads:

NOTICE. The English captain of a merchant ship, Charles Fryatt, of Southampton, though he did not belong to the armed forces of the enemy, attempted on March 28th, 1915, to destroy a German submarine by running it down. For this he has been condemned to death by judgment this day of the Field Court Martial of the Naval Corps, and has been executed. A ruthless deed has thus been avenged, belatedly but just. Signed VON SCHRÖDER, Admiral Commandant of the Naval Corps, Bruges, July 27th, 1916.

=== German post-war confirmation of court-martial ===
On 2 April 1919, a German international law commission, named the "Schücking Commission" for its chairman Walther Schücking, reconfirmed Fryatt's sentence:

The execution by firing squad of Captain Charles Fryatt, ordered by the Court Martial of Bruges following judgment in the court-martial proceedings of 27 July 1916, involves no violation of international law. [However, t]he Commission regrets most deeply the haste with which the sentence was carried out.

The commission's ruling was not unanimous. Two members of the legal review panel, Eduard Bernstein and Oskar Cohn, dissented because in their opinion Fryatt's conviction and execution had been "a serious violation of international law" and "an inexcusable judicial murder".

== Reaction ==
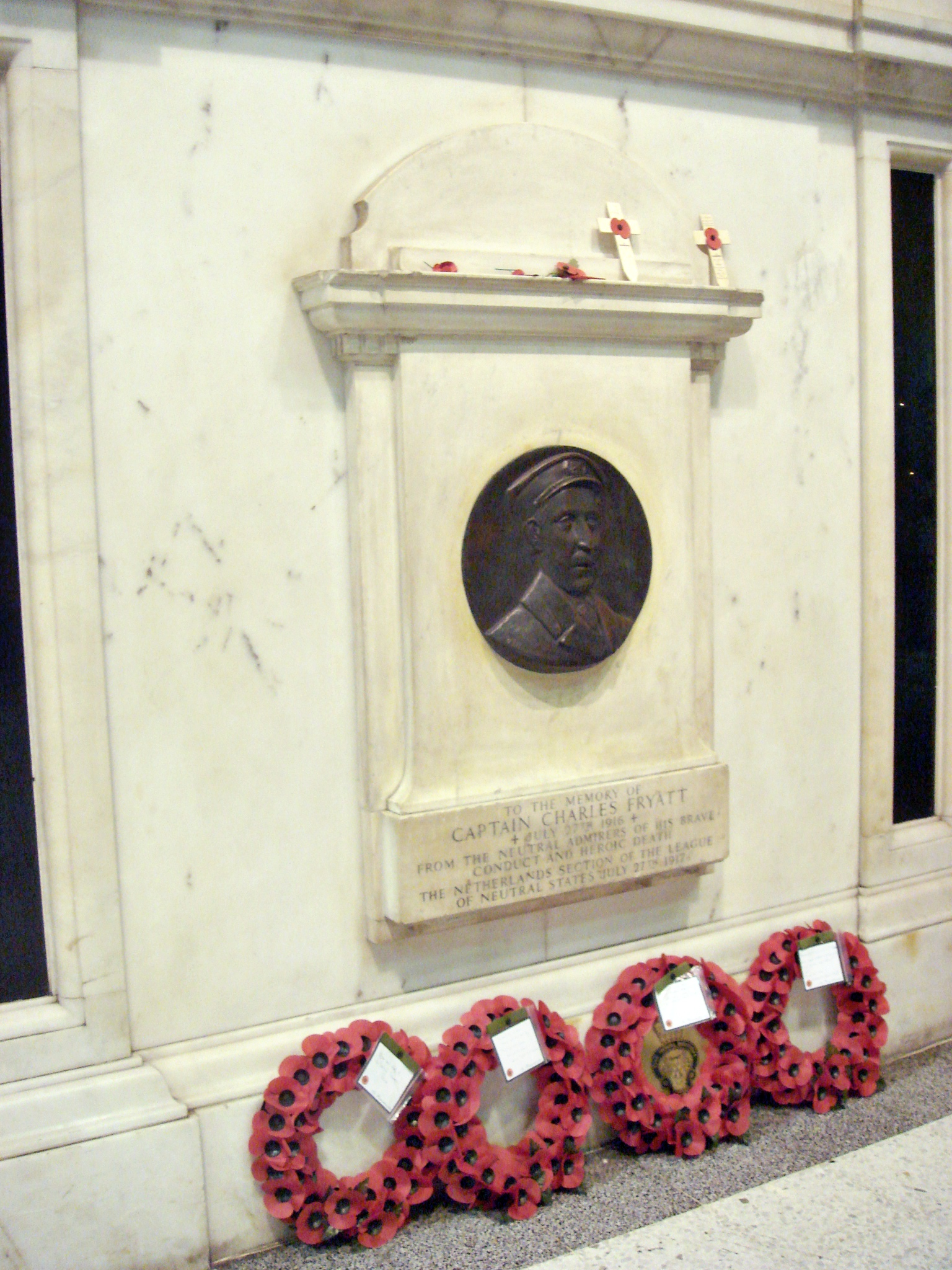
Memorial to Fryatt at Liverpool Street station

On 31 July 1916, British Prime Minister H. H. Asquith issued a statement in the House of Commons.

I deeply regret to say that it appears to be true that Captain Fryatt has been murdered by the Germans. His Majesty's Government have heard with the utmost indignation of this atrocious crime against the laws of nations and the usages of war. Coming as it does contemporaneously with the lawless cruelty towards the population of Lille and other occupied districts of France, it shews that the German High Command, under the stress of military defeat, have renewed their policy of terrorism. It is impossible of course to conjecture to what atrocities they may proceed. His Majesty's Government desire to repeat emphatically their resolve that such crimes shall not, if they can help it, go unpunished. When the time arrives they are determined to bring to justice the criminals whoever they may be and whatever position they may occupy. In such cases as these the authors of the system under which such crimes are committed may well be the most guilty of all. The question of what immediate action can be taken is engaging the earnest attention of the Government and I hope very soon to announce to the House of Commons what we can do.

Lord Balfour said the following in response to the execution of Fryatt.

It means that neither enemy civilians or neutrals are to possess rights against militant Germans; that those who do not resist will be drowned, and those who do will be shot.

Lord Claud Hamilton, MP, Chairman of the Great Eastern Railway, denounced the execution as "sheer, brutal murder". The Mayor of Harwich opened a fund to erect a permanent memorial to Fryatt. A similar fund was opened in the Netherlands.

In the United States, The New York Times denounced the execution as "a deliberate murder". The New York Herald termed it "The crowning German atrocity". In the Netherlands, the Nieuwe Rotterdamsche Courant described the execution as "arbitrary and unjust", while the Handelsblad Holland termed it "A cowardly murder inspired by hatred and revenge". In Switzerland, the Journal de Genève said "It is monstrous to maintain that armed forces have a right to murder civilians but that civilians are guilty of a crime in defending themselves". The Dutch branch of the League of Neutral States presented the Great Eastern Railway a memorial tablet which was erected at Liverpool Street station. The memorial was unveiled on 27 July 1917, exactly a year after Fryatt's execution. The scrap value of Brussels was donated towards the cost.

The Great Eastern Railway awarded Fryatt's widow a pension of £250 per annum. The Government granted her an extra £100 per annum pension in addition to her entitlement. Fryatt's insurers, the Provident Clerk's Association, paid the £300 that Mrs Fryatt was entitled to immediately, dispensing with the usual formalities. The Royal Merchant Seaman's Orphanage offered to educate two of Fryatt's seven children. King George V expressed his indignation and abhorrence at the execution of Fryatt in a letter to Mrs Fryatt. In the letter, he also wrote: "The action of Captain Fryatt in defending his ship against the attack of an enemy submarine was a noble instance of the resource and self-reliance so characteristic of his profession."

The incident inspired an Australian film, The Murder of Captain Fryatt (1917). The script was reportedly based on British admiralty naval reports.

== Funeral and reburial ==
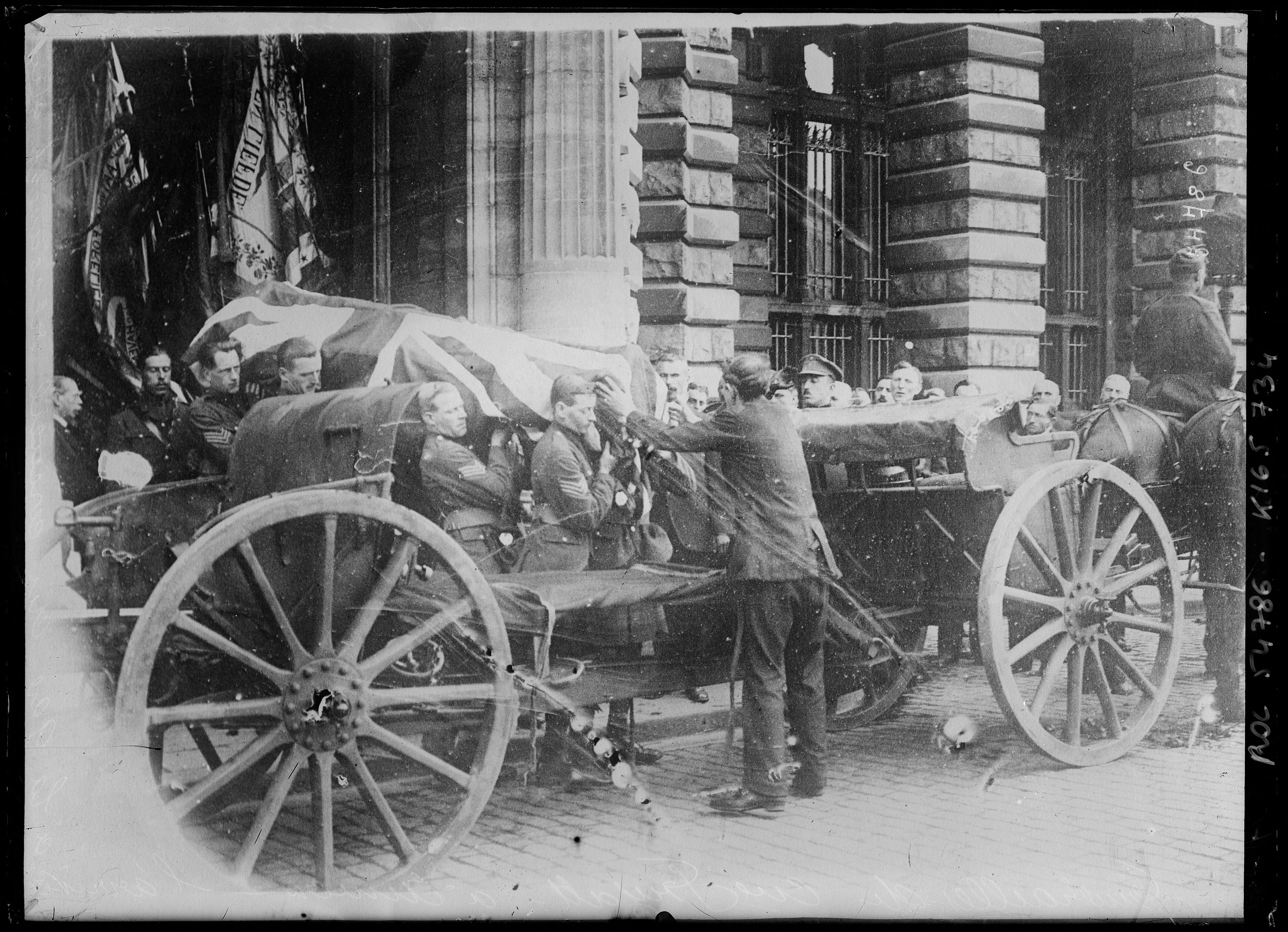
Fryatt's coffin departing from Antwerp, 6 July 1919.

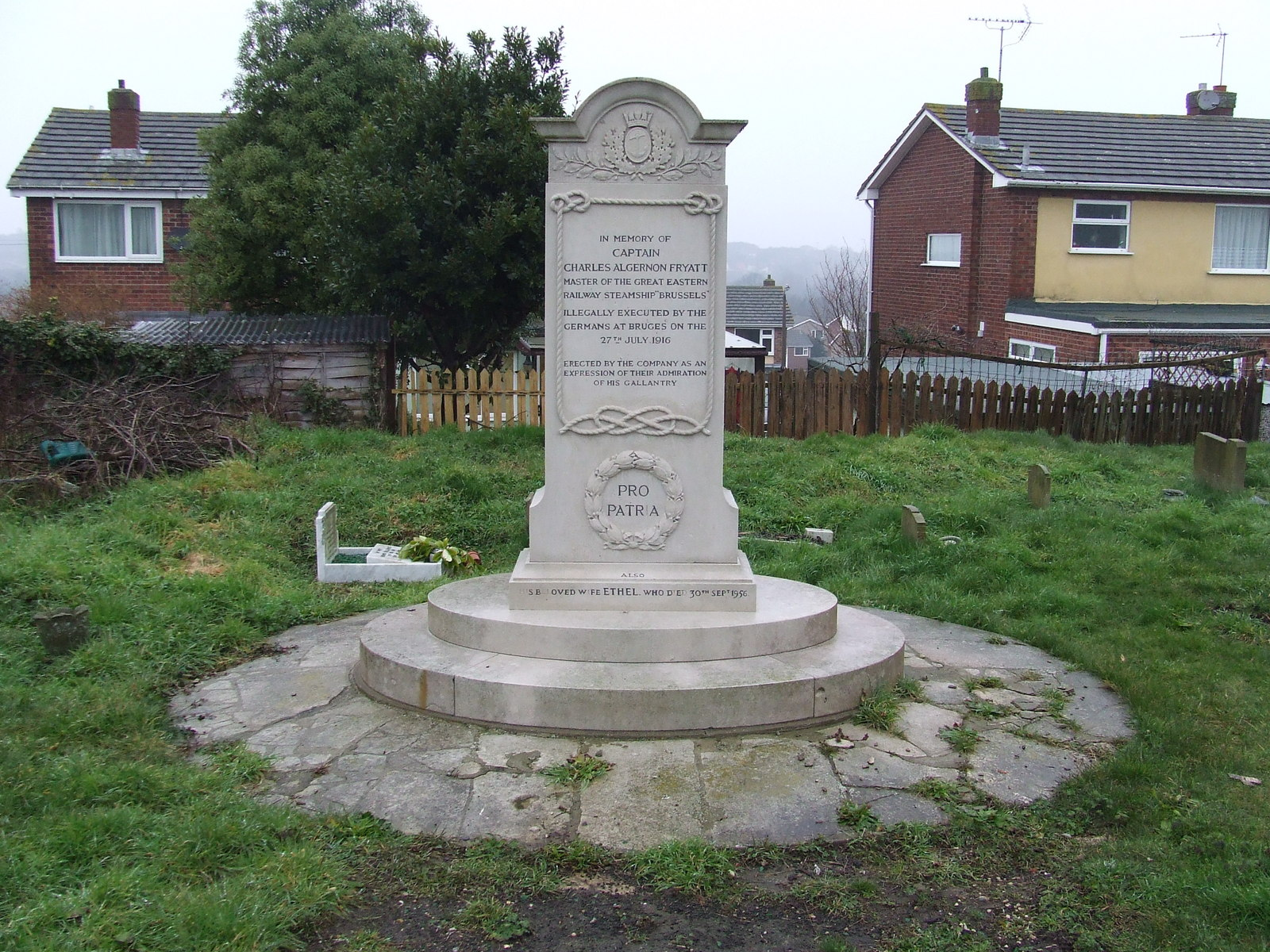
The grave of Charles Fryatt at All Saints' Church, Upper Dovercourt

In July 1919, Fryatt's body was exhumed from the small cemetery near Bruges and returned to the United Kingdom for burial. Fryatt was one of only three sets of British remains given a state funeral following the end of World War I, the others being the nurse Edith Cavell and The Unknown Warrior. His coffin was landed at Dover, and transported in South Eastern and Chatham Railway PMV No.132 to London. On 8 July 1919, his funeral service was held at St Paul's Cathedral. Hundreds of merchant seamen and widows of merchant seamen and fishermen attended. Representing the Government were many members of the Admiralty, the Board of Trade, the Cabinet and the War Office.

The band of the Great Eastern Railway, augmented by drummers from the Royal Marines, played the "Dead March". "Eternal Father, Strong to Save" and "Abide with Me" were sung, and a blessing given by the Bishop of London. The route of the coffin to Liverpool Street station was lined with people.

Fryatt was buried at All Saints' Church, Upper Dovercourt. His coffin was carried from the station to the church on a gun carriage. His widow was presented with the insignia of the Belgian Order of Leopold that had been posthumously awarded to Fryatt. Fryatt was also posthumously awarded the Belgian Maritime War Cross. In November 2018, Fryatt's grave was restored after years of neglect.

== Namesakes ==
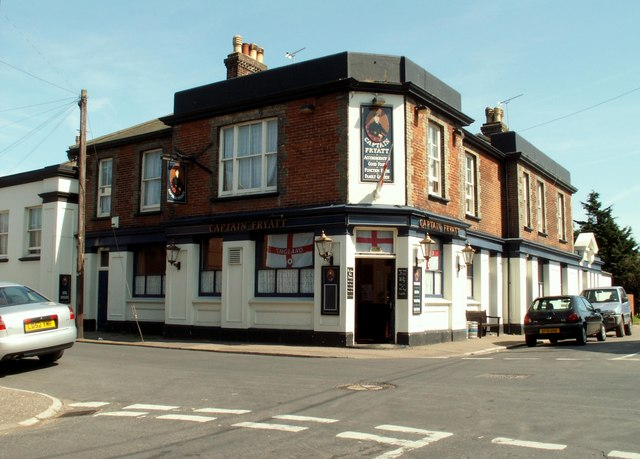
'Captain Fryatt' public house, Parkeston, Essex.

In Zeebrugge there is a street named after Captain Fryatt – Kapitein Fryattstraat. A wing at Dovercourt Cottage Hospital – which is now known as the Captain Fryatt Memorial Hospital. – was named in Fryatt's honour. A public house in nearby Parkeston is also named in Captain Fryatt's honour.

In Canada, the 11,027-foot (3,361 m) high Mount Fryatt (52°33′00″N 117°54′35″W) was named in 1921 in honour of Captain Fryatt. The 10,317-foot (3,145 m) high Brussels Peak (51°31′00″N 117°49′20″W) was named in honour of his ship.

== Commemoration ==
In 2016, an exhibition was held from 23 to 31 July at the Masonic Hall, Harwich, to commemorate the 100th anniversary of his execution.

The local cottage hospital became known as the Harwich and District, Fryatt Memorial Hospital from about 1925. In 2019, the modern Harwich Hospital was renamed in his honour as the Fryatt Memorial Hospital.

== See also ==
- Baralong incidents—Shipwrecked U-boatmen fired upon and massacred by Royal Navy sailors
- Crash of Zeppelin LZ 54 (L 19)—German crew abandoned by British to drown in North Sea
- Thrasher incident

== Sources ==
- Carver, Ben (2016). Captain Charles Fryatt: Courageous Mariner of the First World War. Amberley Publishing Limited. ISBN 9781445658629.
- "The case of Captain Fryatt". Great Eastern Railway Magazine. University of York. 2003. Archived from the original on 25 May 2005.
- "Germans Execute British Skipper" (PDF). The New York Times. 29 July 1916. ISSN 1553-8095. OCLC 1645522.
- Smith, Michael (2011). Six: The Real James Bonds 1909–1939. Biteback Publishing. ISBN 9781849542647.
- "HERE IS A MAN". The New York Times. 30 July 1916.
