= Cavell Van =

British train van

Coordinates: 51°4′14″N 0°41′7″E

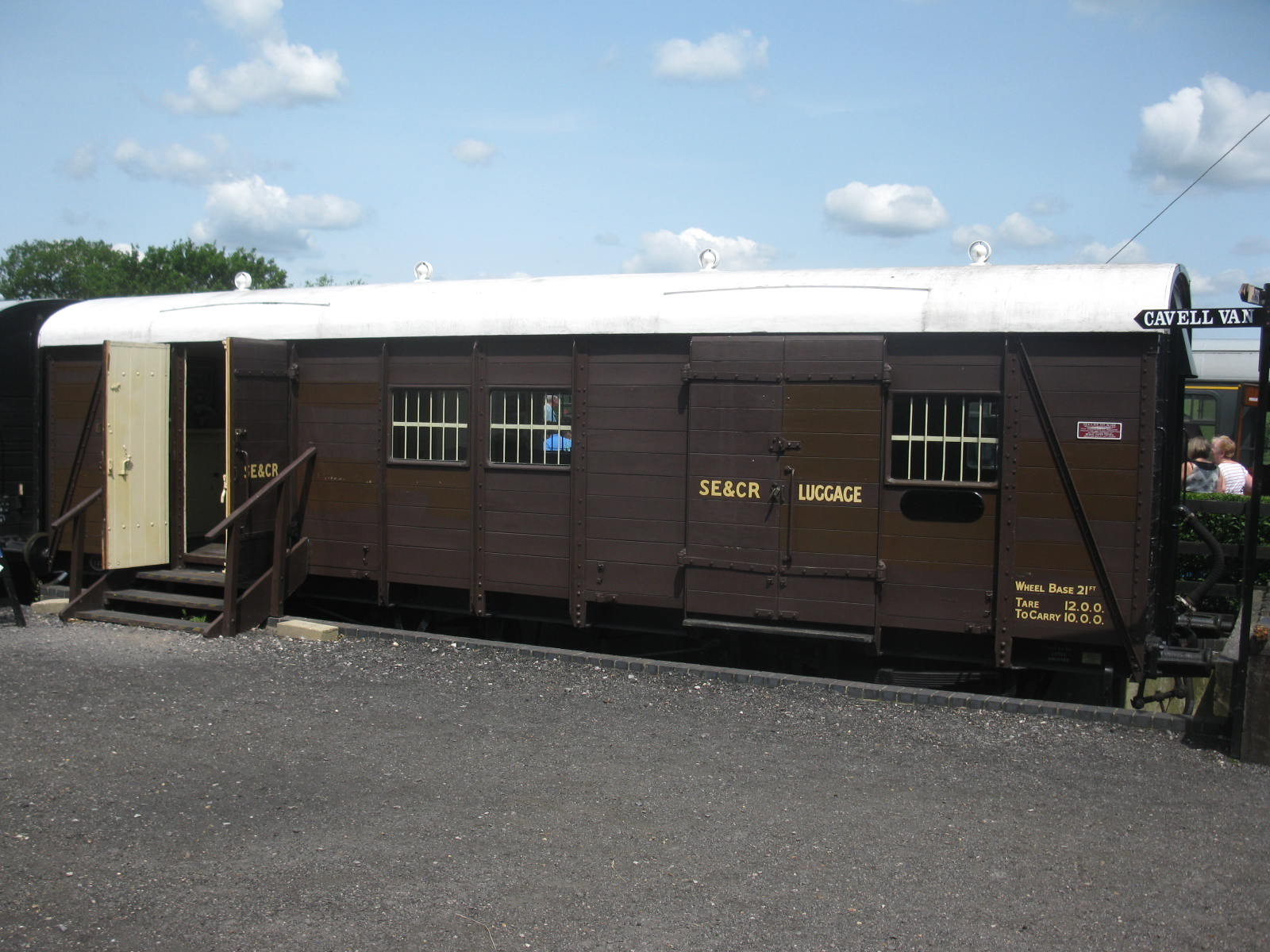
- The Cavell Van after restoration
- In service: 1919–91
- Manufacturer: South Eastern and Chatham Railway
- Built at: Ashford Works
- Family name: PMVY
- Constructed: 1919
- Refurbished: 2010
- Number built: 1
- Number preserved: 1
- Fleet numbers: 132; 1972; DS734; 082757; 93
- Operators: South Eastern and Chatham Railway; Southern Railway; British Railways (Southern Region); Kent and East Sussex Railway

Specifications
- Car length: 32 feet 0 inches (9.75 m)
- Track gauge: 1,435 mm (4 ft 8 1/2 in)

The Cavell Van is the prototype Parcels and Miscellaneous Van (US: boxcar) built by the South Eastern and Chatham Railway in 1919. It is so named because it was the van which carried the body of Edith Cavell when it was repatriated to the United Kingdom following the end of the First World War. The van also carried the bodies of Charles Fryatt and The Unknown Warrior. The three were the only sets of British remains repatriated following the end of World War I. The van served with the South Eastern and Chatham Railway, the Southern Railway and British Railways before entering into preservation at the Kent and East Sussex Railway. The van was fully restored in 2010.

== History ==
The Cavell Van was designed by Richard Maunsell. It was built to Diagram 960 by the South Eastern and Chatham Railway at Ashford Works in 1919 and was the prototype Parcels and Miscellaneous Van. In 1919, it was used for the carriage of the bodies of two people killed during the First World War – Edith Cavell and Charles Fryatt. It carried the body of The Unknown Warrior in 1920.

=== Edith Cavell ===
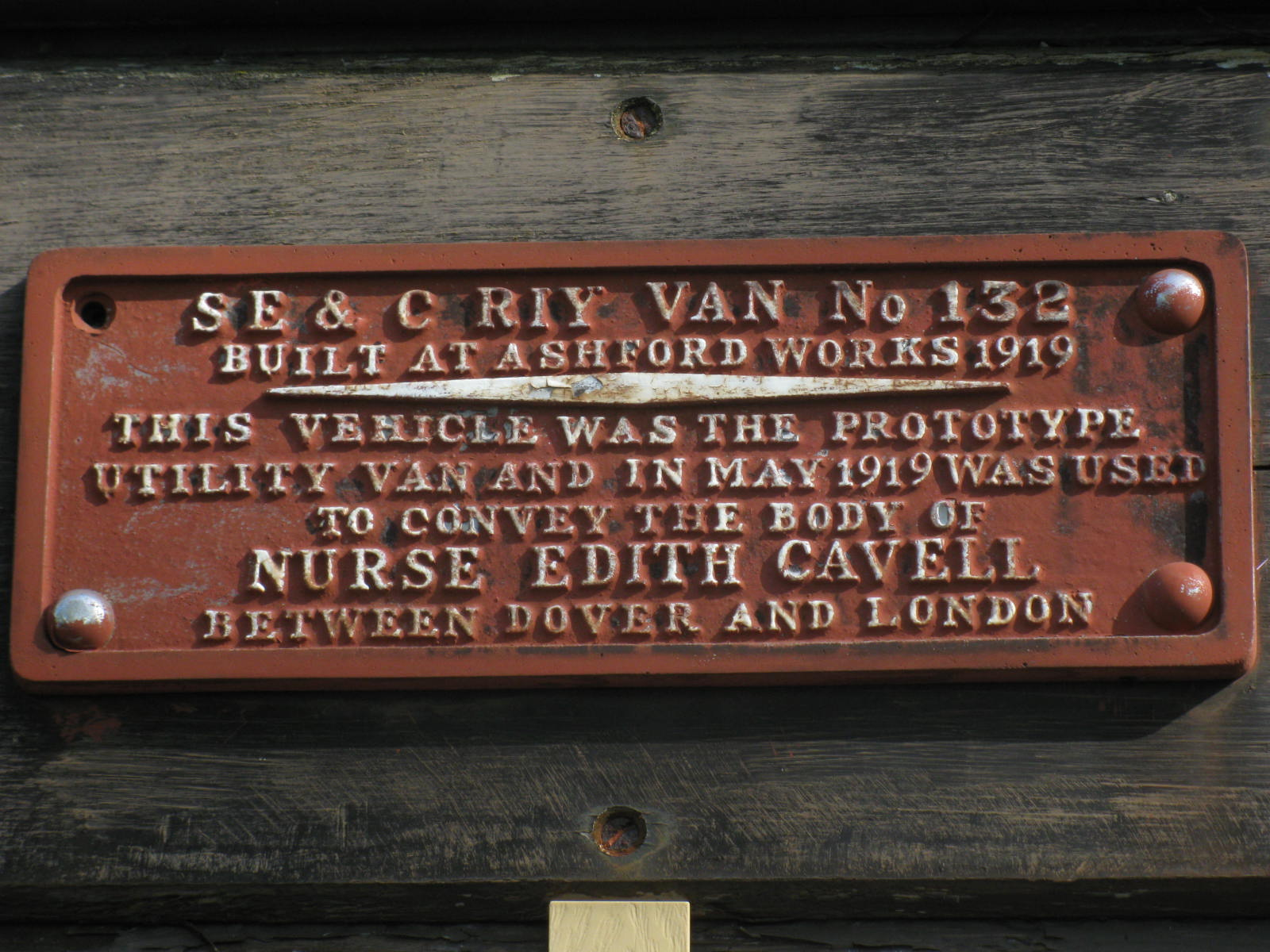
Plaque carried on the van

Edith Cavell was born in Swardeston, Norfolk in 1865. She trained as a nurse in 1907 and worked at various hospitals in Belgium. During 1914–15, she helped over 200 allied POWs escape before being arrested and subsequently executed. Her body was repatriated from Belgium in May 1919, and was transported in the Cavell Van from Dover to London.

=== Charles Fryatt ===
Charles Fryatt was born in Southampton, Hampshire in 1872. A merchant mariner, he joined the Great Eastern Railway in 1892 and took command of his first ship in 1913. On 28 March 1915, his ship, the SS Brussels was ordered to stop by U-33, but Fryatt ordered full steam ahead and attempted to ram U-33, which crash dived. On 25 June 1916, Fryatt's ship was captured by the Germans and escorted into Zeebrugge. Fryatt was Court Martialled and later executed. His body was repatriated in July 1919, and was carried in the Cavell Van from Dover to London, prior to his funeral at St. Paul's Cathedral, London.

=== The Unknown Warrior ===
The Unknown Warrior was a British soldier killed on a battlefield in Europe. His body was carried from Dover to London on board the Cavell Van on 10 November 1920, prior to the funeral service at Westminster Abbey on 11 November 1920.

=== Service history ===
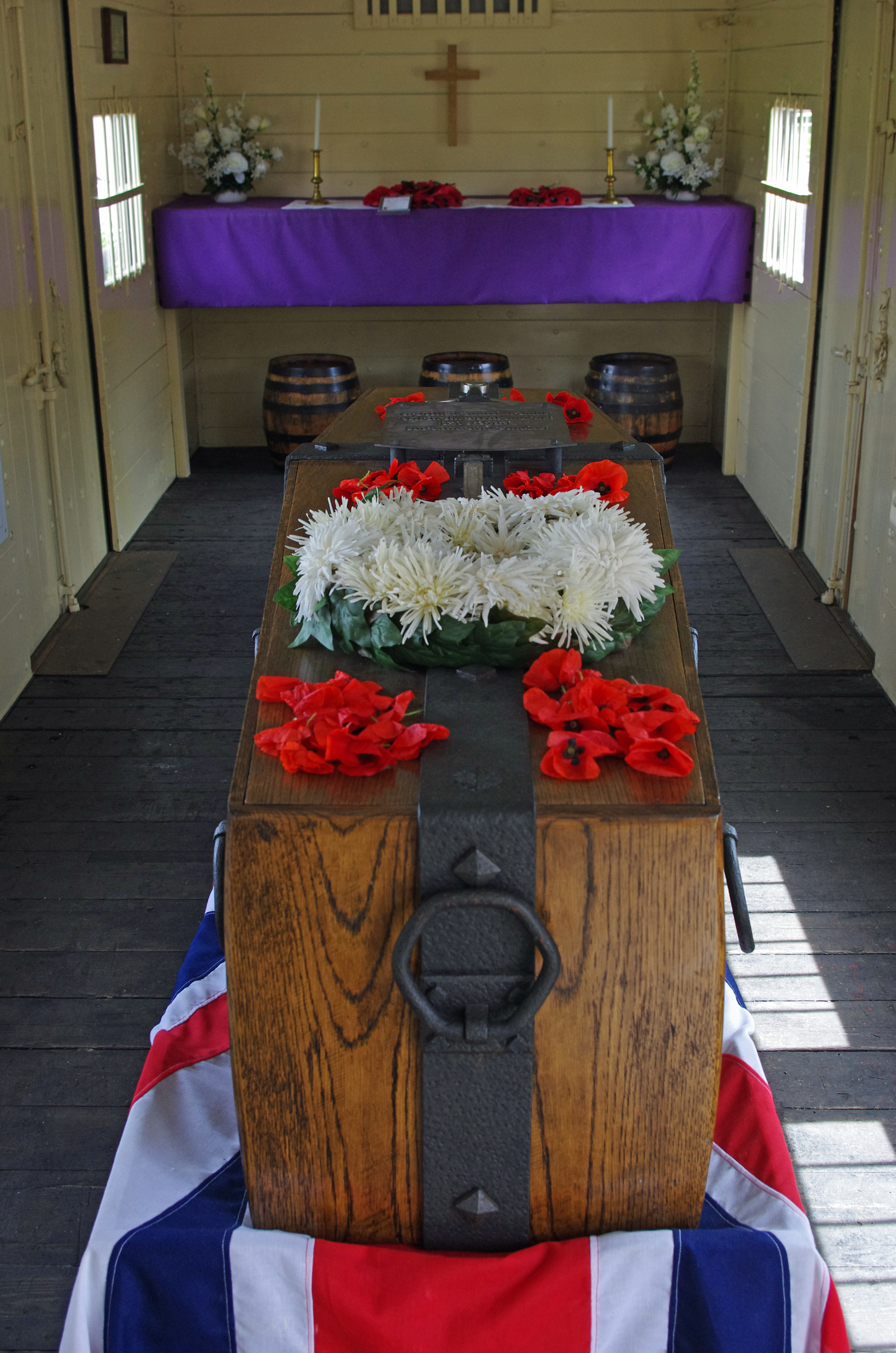
Interior Cavell Van, Bodiam

The van was numbered 132 by the South Eastern and Chatham Railway. It passed to the Southern Railway in 1923 and was renumbered 1972, then 374S on transfer to departmental service in August 1946. The van was used as a stores van serving Lancing Carriage Works and Brighton Works. Under British Railways it was numbered DS734. It was transferred to the internal user pool in October 1967 and renumbered 082757. The van ended its service at Guildford cable depot. The van was withdrawn from service in 1991 and stored at Hoo Junction. It was sold to the Tenterden Rolling Stock Group in 1992 and moved to the Kent and East Sussex Railway. It was delivered to Wittersham Road on 22 January 1992. The van is numbered 93 on the Kent and East Sussex Railway stocklist. In 1994, the van was moved to the Rother Valley Railway at Robertsbridge. During its stay at the Rother Valley Railway, the van was sold and its condition deteriorated. It was sold again in 2003 and returned to the Kent and East Sussex Railway in 2004.

In December 2009, an appeal was opened to raise £35,000 to fully restore the van, with the intention of completion by 10 November 2010, the 90th anniversary of the carriage of the body of The Unknown Warrior. The fully restored van was unveiled on 10 November 2010, and will now be used as a museum to commemorate The Unknown Warrior, Cavell and Fryatt. The exhibition mounted inside the van was put together by pupils from Homewood School, Tenterden, in a joint project between the school and the railway. The pupils carried out research at the Imperial War Museum, London, where they were allowed access to letters written by Cavell. The project was entered in a competition organised by the British Interactive Media Association. Homewood School were declared the winners of the competition on 8 July 2010. The van's historical importance is assessed as "very important" by the Vintage Carriages Trust. In October 2015, the van was transported by road to Norwich, Norfolk as part of the commemorations for the 100th anniversary of Edith Cavell's death. The van was on display outside The Forum until 17 October.
