= Fryatt Memorial Hospital =

Hospital in Dovercourt, England

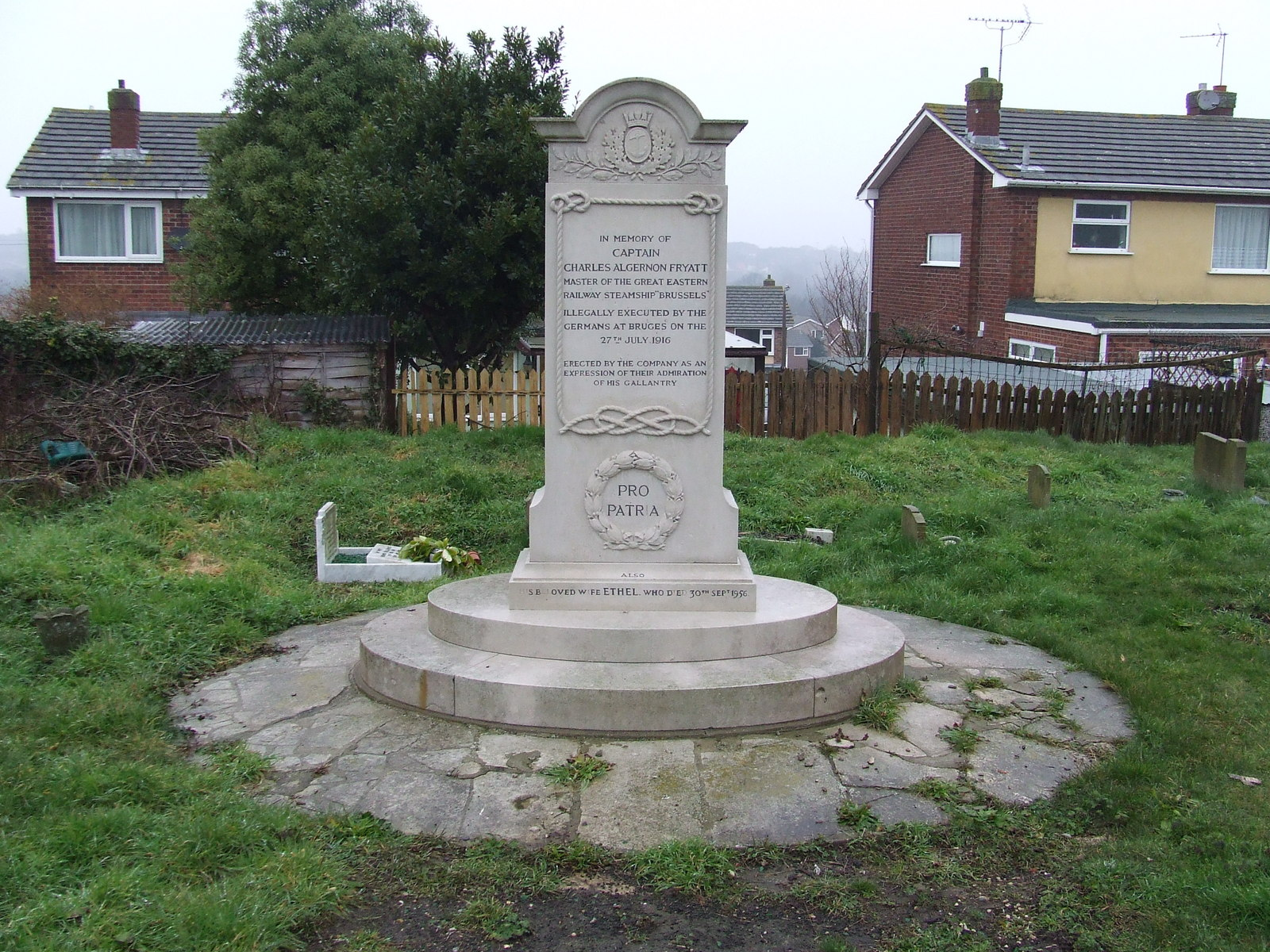
The memorial to Captain Fryatt

Fryatt Memorial Hospital, previously known as Harwich and District Hospital opened in Dovercourt in a large house in 1922, which was converted into a twelve bedded cottage hospital. It was also known as Harwich and Dovercourt Hospital. By 1925, the hospital was referred as the Harwich and District Hospital and Fryatt Memorial after Captain Charles Algernon Fryatt, a Harwich Mariner who was executed in Bruges in 1916 after he tried to ram a German U-boat during the First World War with his civilian boat. Fryatt had a state funeral in St Paul's Cathedral, London. The hospital was eventually enlarged to have 26 beds. In 1925 a new wing was opened which contained two private wards, a ward for men, an operating theatre, nurses accommodation. The hospital was pulled down in the early twenty-first century. This was replaced with a new hospital Harwich and District Hospital which opened in 2006. Although informally known as the Fryatt Hospital, it was formerly renamed as the Fryatt Memorial Hospital in 2019.

== Notable staff ==
- Clarita Carmen Sable (1883–1964) Matron, 1926- until at least 1946. Sable trained at The London Hospital under Eva Luckes between 1913 and 1917. For the last two years of her training Sable worked as a staff nurse at the hospital and also for the hospitals Private Nursing Institution. Sable joined the College of Nursing in 1919. During the Second World War she oversaw the care of casualties of war, alongside organising regular civilian care.
