= SS Colchester =

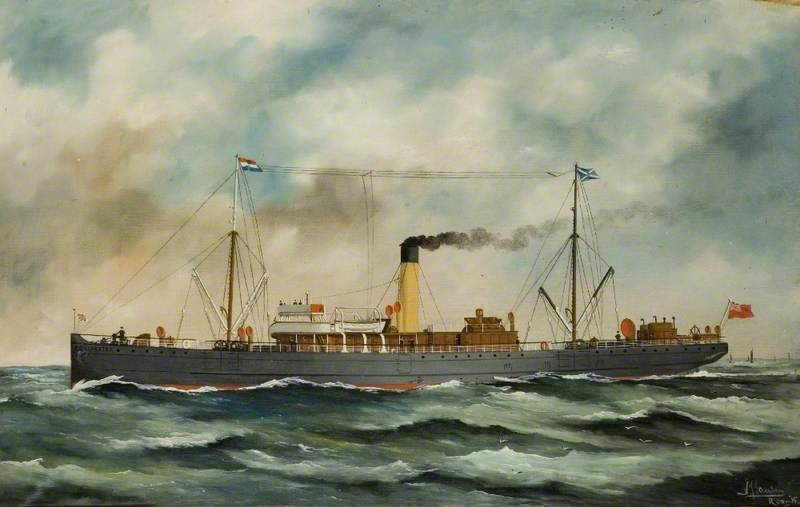
- SS Colchester by A. J. Jansen

History
- Name: 1886–1919: TSS Colchester
- Operator: 1886–1916: Great Eastern Railway
- Route: 1886–1916: Harwich to Rotterdam and Antwerp
- Builder: Earle's Shipbuilding, Hull
- Launched: 16 October 1888
- Out of service: 1919
- Fate: Scrapped 1919

General characteristics
- Tonnage: 1,160 gross register tons (GRT)
- Length: 280.8 feet (85.6 m)
- Beam: 31 feet (9.4 m)
- Depth: 15.2 feet (4.6 m)
- Speed: 14.5 knots

TSS Colchester was a passenger vessel built for the Great Eastern Railway in 1888.

== History ==
The ship was built by Earle's Shipbuilding in Hull for the Great Eastern Railway and launched on 16 October 1888. She was launched by the Mayoress of Colchester (Miss Paxman). She was placed on the Harwich to Hook of Holland route.

Was operating to neutral Holland when captured by Germany on 21 September 1916. Captain Bennett and his crew of 29 were interned at Ruhleben. The Colchester was damaged in an attack on Zeebrugge on 17 February 1917.

She grounded at Kiel in 1918 and was scrapped in 1919.
