= The Unknown Warrior =

Unidentified British soldier killed in WWI

- United Kingdom
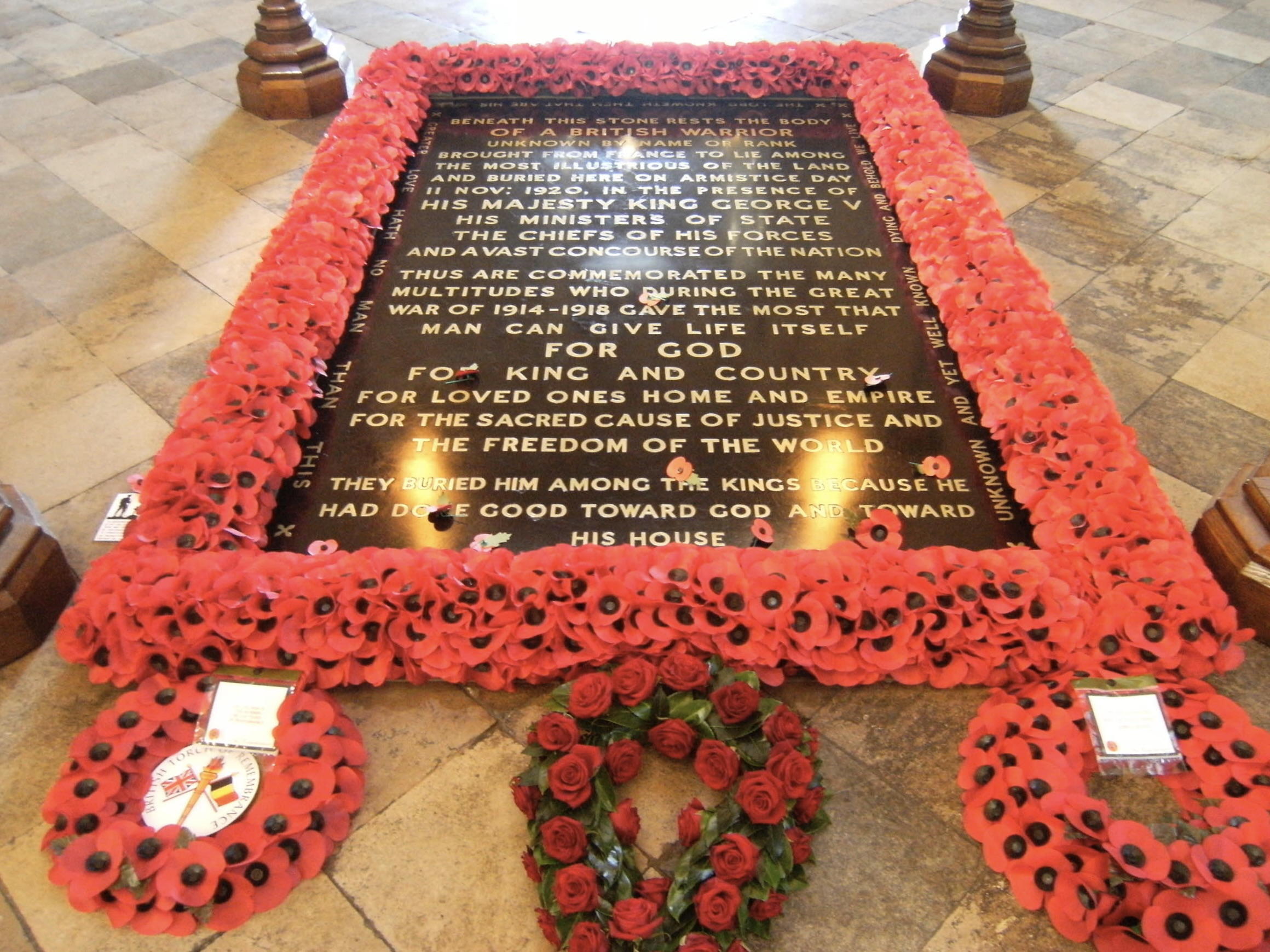
- The Tomb of the Unknown Warrior
- For the unknown war dead, wherever they fell
- Unveiled: 11 November 1920
- Location: 51°29′58″N 0°7′39″W near London, England

The Unknown Warrior is an unidentified member of the British Imperial armed forces who died on the Western Front during the First World War. He is interred in a grave at Westminster Abbey, also known as the Tomb of the Unknown Warrior.

He was given a state funeral and buried on 11 November 1920, simultaneously with a similar interment of a French unknown soldier at the Arc de Triomphe in France, making both graves the first examples of a tomb of the unknown soldier, and the first to honour the unknown dead of the First World War.

Officially, the buried man may be from the army, navy or air force, and from any part of the British Empire at the time. However, the National Army Museum notes that the methodology used to choose a body may have been more likely to lead to the selection of a British Isles soldier who died in 1914.

== History ==
=== Origins ===
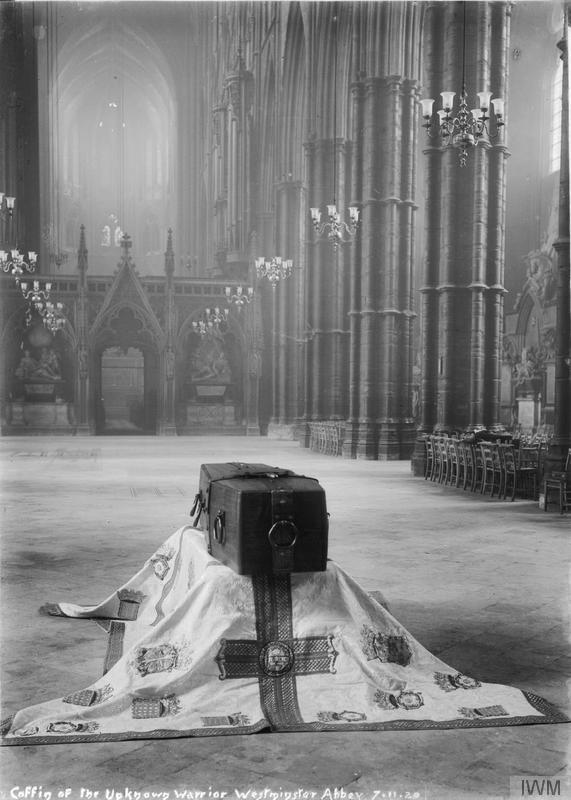
The coffin of the Unknown Warrior in state in the Abbey in 1920, before burial.

The idea of a Tomb of the Unknown Warrior was first conceived in 1916 by the Reverend David Railton, who, while serving as an army chaplain on the Western Front, had seen a grave marked by a rough cross, which bore the pencil-written legend 'An Unknown British Soldier'.

He wrote to the dean of Westminster, Herbert Ryle, in 1920 proposing that an unidentified British soldier from the battlefields in France be buried with due ceremony in Westminster Abbey "amongst the kings" to represent the many hundreds of thousands of Empire dead. The idea was strongly supported by the dean and the prime minister, David Lloyd George, who later wrote "The Cenotaph is the token of our mourning as a nation; the Grave of the Unknown Warrior is the token of our mourning as individuals".

=== Selection, arrival and ceremony ===
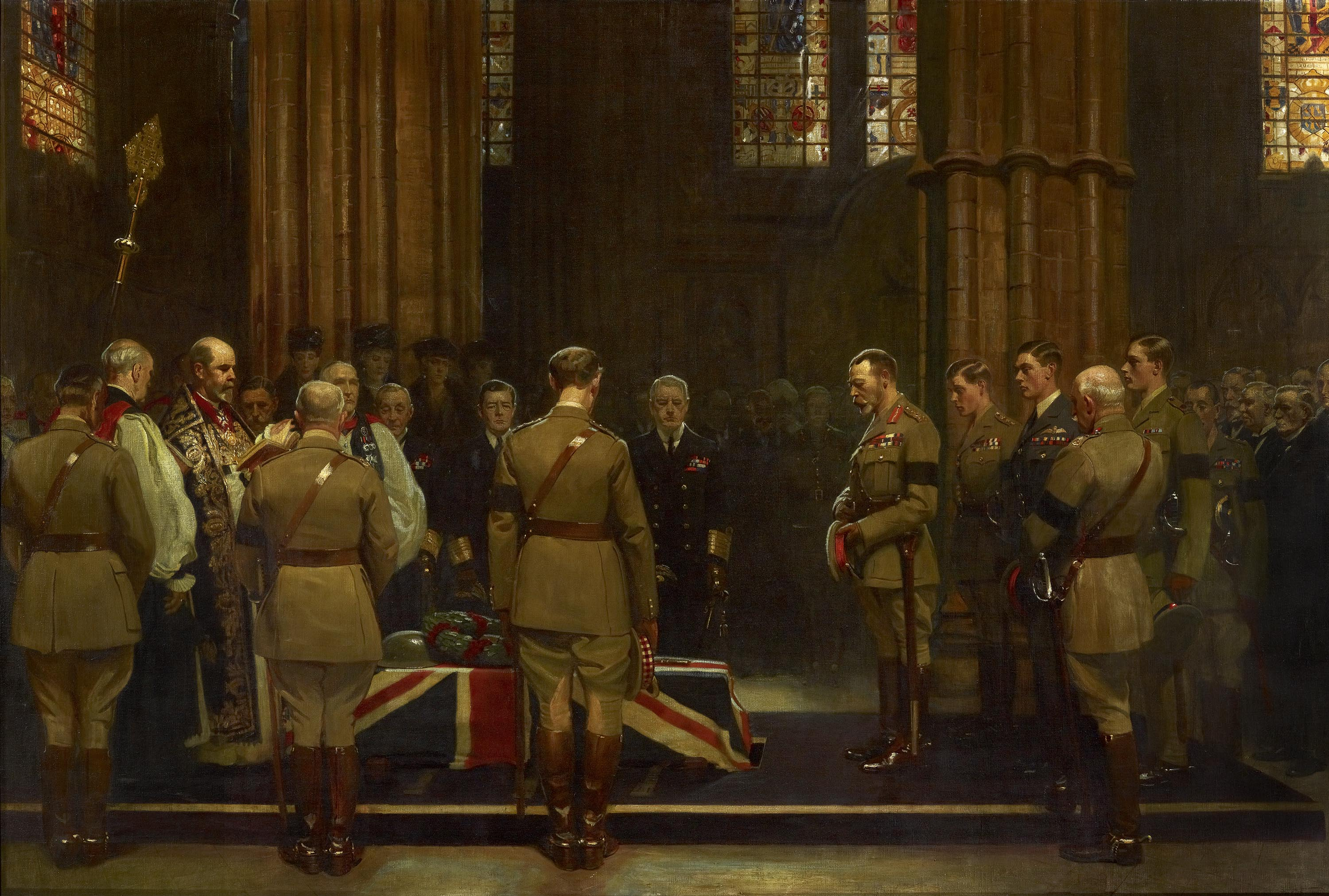
Burial of The Unknown Warrior in Westminster Abbey, with King George V in attendance, 1920.

Arrangements were placed in the hands of Lord Curzon of Kedleston who prepared in committee the service and location. Suitable remains were exhumed from various battlefields and brought to the chapel at Saint-Pol-sur-Ternoise near Arras, France, on the night of 8 November 1920. The bodies were received by the Reverend George Kendall OBE. Brigadier L. J. Wyatt and Lieutenant Colonel E. A. S. Gell of the Directorate of Graves Registration and Enquiries went into the chapel alone. The remains were then placed in four plain coffins each covered by Union Flags: the two officers did not know from which battlefield any individual soldier had come. Brigadier Wyatt with closed eyes rested his hand on one of the coffins. The other soldiers were then taken away for reburial by Kendall.

The coffin of the unknown warrior then stayed at the chapel overnight and on the afternoon of 9 November, it was transferred under guard and escorted by Kendall, with troops lining the route, from St Pol to the medieval castle within the ancient citadel at Boulogne. For the occasion, the castle library was transformed into a chapelle ardente: a company from the French 8th Infantry Division, recently awarded the Légion d'Honneur en masse, stood vigil overnight.

The following morning, two undertakers entered the castle library and placed the coffin into a casket of the oak timbers of trees from Hampton Court Palace. The casket was banded with iron, and a 16th-century sword chosen personally by King George V from the Royal Collection was affixed to the top and surmounted by an iron shield bearing the inscription 'A British Warrior who fell in the Great War 1914–1918 for King and Country'.

The casket was then placed onto a French military wagon, drawn by six black horses. At 10:30 a.m., all the church bells of Boulogne tolled; the massed trumpets of the French cavalry and the bugles of the French infantry played Aux Champs (the French "Last Post"). Then, the mile-long procession—led by 1,000 local schoolchildren and escorted by a division of French troops—made its way down to the harbour.

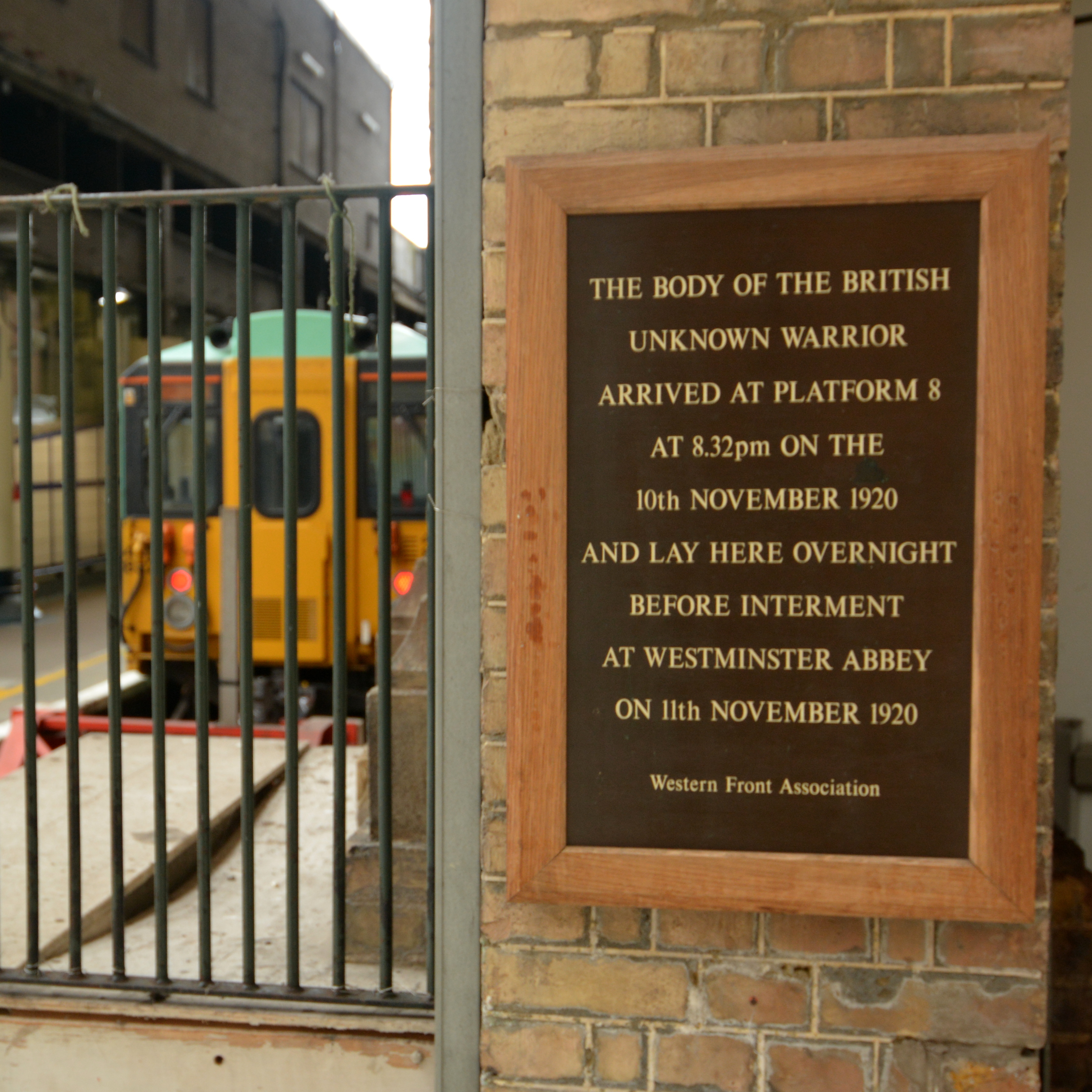
A plaque at Victoria Station marking site of the arrival of the coffin on 10 November.

At the quayside, Marshal Foch saluted the casket before it was carried up the gangway of the destroyer, HMS Verdun, and piped aboard with an admiral's call. The Verdun slipped its moorings just before noon and was joined by an escort of six destroyers (HMS Witherington, HMS Wanderer, HMS Whitshed, HMS Wivern, HMS Wolverine, and HMS Veteran). As the flotilla carrying the casket closed on Dover Castle it received a 19-gun Field Marshal's salute. It was landed at Dover Marine Railway Station at the Western Docks on 10 November. The body of the Unknown Warrior was carried to London in South Eastern and Chatham Railway General Utility Van No.132, which had previously carried the bodies of Edith Cavell and Charles Fryatt. The van has been preserved by the Kent and East Sussex Railway. The train went to Victoria Station, where it arrived at platform 8 at 8:32 p.m. that evening and remained overnight. A plaque marking the site was unveiled on 10 November 1998. Every year on the same date, a small Remembrance service, organised by the Western Front Association, takes place between platforms 8 and 9.

The Unknown Warrior was granted a full state funeral, the only time that this honour has been bestowed on an anonymous person or a representative of a whole group of people. On the morning of 11 November 1920, the casket was placed onto a gun carriage of the Royal Horse Artillery (N Battery RHA) and drawn by six black horses through immense and silent crowds. As the cortege set off, a further Field Marshal's salute was fired in Hyde Park. The route followed was Hyde Park Corner, The Mall, and to Whitehall where the Cenotaph, a "symbolic empty tomb", was unveiled by King George V. The cortège was then followed by The King, the Royal Family and ministers of state to Westminster Abbey, where the casket was borne into the West Nave of the Abbey flanked by a guard of honour of 100 recipients of the Victoria Cross. The guests of honour were a group of about 100 women. They had been chosen because they had each lost their husband and all their sons in the war. "Every woman so bereft who applied for a place got it."

The coffin was then interred in the far western end of the Nave, only a few feet from the entrance, in soil brought from each of the main battlefields, and covered with a silk pall. Servicemen from the armed forces stood guard as tens of thousands of mourners filed silently past. The ceremony appears to have served as a form of catharsis for collective mourning on a scale not previously known.

The grave was then capped with a black Belgian marble stone (the only tombstone in the Abbey on which it is forbidden to walk) featuring this inscription, composed by Herbert Edward Ryle, Dean of Westminster, engraved with brass from melted down wartime ammunition.

Beneath this stone rests the body
Of a British warrior
Unknown by name or rank
Brought from France to lie among
The most illustrious of the land
And buried here on Armistice Day
11 Nov: 1920, in the presence of
His Majesty King George V
His Ministers of State
The Chiefs of his forces
And a vast concourse of the nation

Thus are commemorated the many
Multitudes who during the Great
War of 1914 – 1918 gave the most that
Man can give life itself
For God
For King and country
For loved ones home and empire
For the sacred cause of justice and
The freedom of the world

They buried him among the kings because he
Had done good toward God and toward
His house

This last sentence is a paraphrase of 2 Chronicles 24:16, taken from the story of Jehoiada: "And they buried him in the city of David among the kings, because he had done good in Israel, both toward God, and toward his house."

Around the main inscription are four New Testament quotations:

- The Lord knoweth them that are his (top; 2 Timothy 2:19)
- Unknown and yet well known, dying and behold we live (side; 2 Corinthians 6:9)
- Greater love hath no man than this (side; John 15:13)
- In Christ shall all be made alive (base; 1 Corinthians 15:22)

=== Later history ===
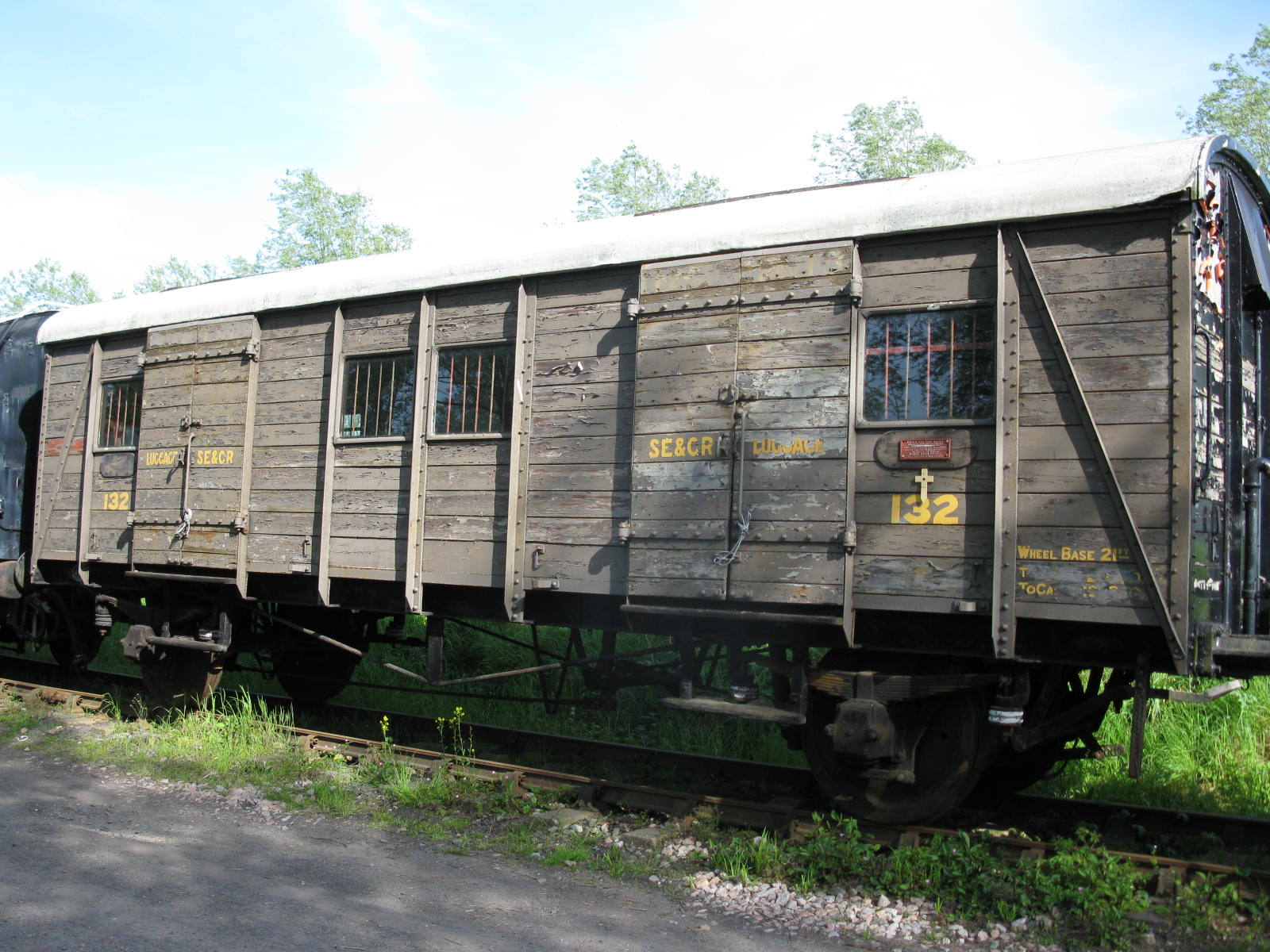
The Cavell Van - the van in which the body of the Unknown Warrior was carried - before restoration in 2010.

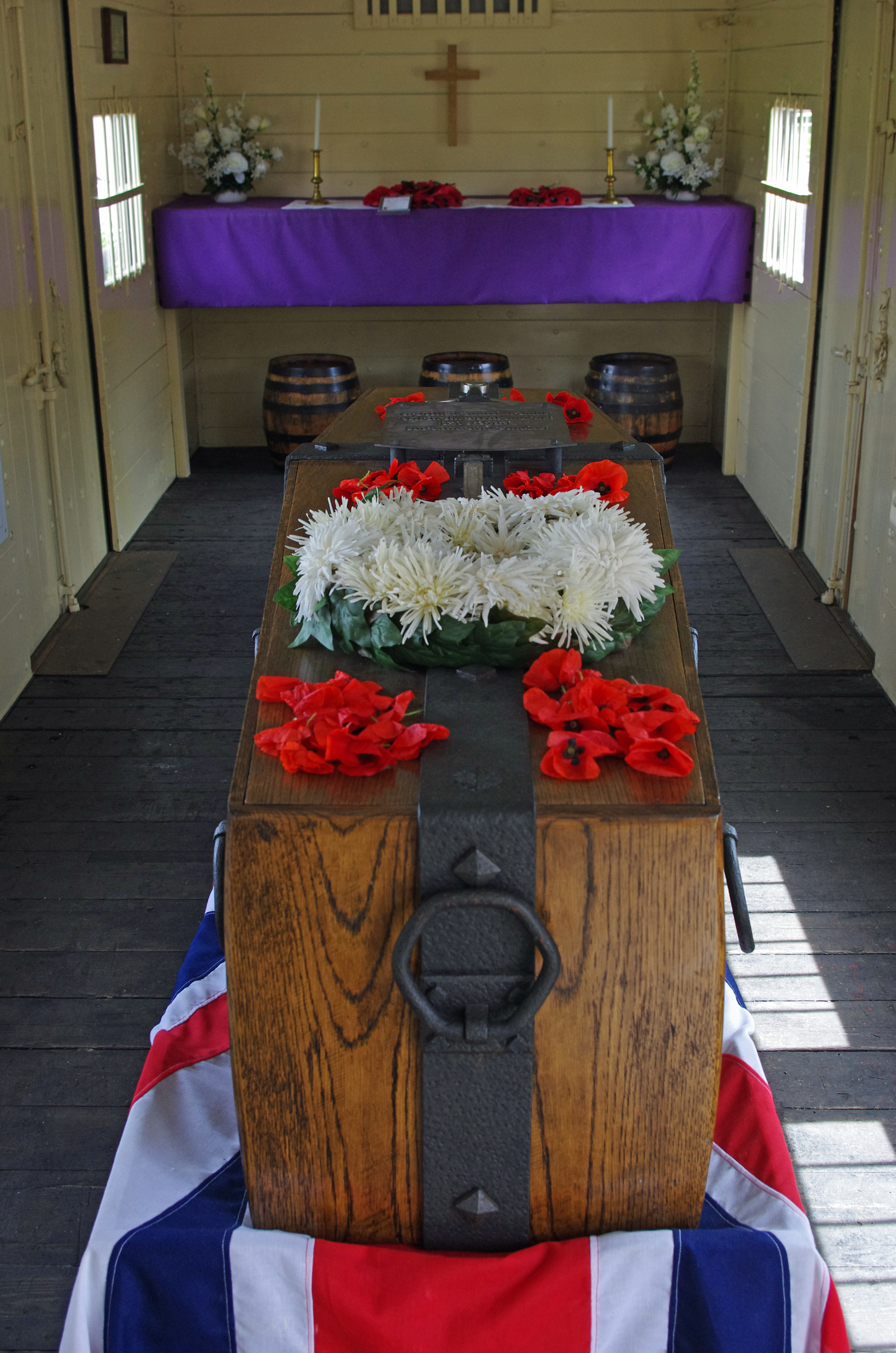
Replica coffin of the Unknown Warrior; interior of the Cavell Van, Bodiam.

A year later, on 17 October 1921, the Unknown Warrior was given the United States' highest award for valour, the Medal of Honor, from the hand of General John Pershing; it hangs on a pillar close to the tomb. On 11 November 1921, the American Unknown Soldier was reciprocally awarded the Victoria Cross.

When Elizabeth Bowes-Lyon (later Queen Elizabeth the Queen Mother) married Prince Albert, Duke of York (who became King George VI) on 26 April 1923, she laid her bouquet at the Tomb on her way into the Abbey, as a tribute to her brother Fergus who had died at the Battle of Loos in 1915. His name was then listed among those of the missing on the Loos Memorial although in 2012 a new headstone was erected in the Quarry Cemetery, Vermelles. Royal brides, whether married at the Abbey or elsewhere, have since had their bouquets laid on the tomb the day after the wedding and all official wedding photographs have been taken. It is also the only tomb not to have been covered by red carpet for the wedding of then-Philip Mountbatten to Princess Elizabeth.

Before she died in 2002, Queen Elizabeth the Queen Mother expressed a wish for her wreath to be placed on the Tomb of the Unknown Warrior as at her wedding day. Her daughter, Queen Elizabeth II, laid the wreath the day after the funeral.

The British Unknown Warrior came 76th in the 100 Great Britons poll. A new steam locomotive, LMS Patriot Class 5551 The Unknown Warrior, is being constructed by a charitable project, the LMS-Patriot Project, at Tyseley Locomotive Works. The new locomotive is destined to be the new National Memorial Engine, continuing the Remembrance tradition of the Patriot class steam locomotive and its predecessors. A public appeal to build the locomotive was launched in 2008 and work continues today.

Heads of state from more than 70 countries have lain wreaths in memory of the Unknown Warrior.

On the 100th anniversary of the interment, a ceremony attended by Prince Charles (later Charles III), his wife Camilla, and then-Prime Minister Boris Johnson, was held at the Abbey and broadcast live to the nation by the BBC. The Poet Laureate, Simon Armitage, read a newly written poem "The Bed". Queen Elizabeth II also laid a wreath at the tomb.

== Related memorials ==
There have been three related memorials erected since 1920 for the Unknown Warrior:

- St. Pol where the Unknown Warrior was selected
- Dover harbour at the cruise terminal, where the Unknown Warrior was brought ashore
- Victoria Station, London, where the Unknown Warrior rested before his burial on 11 November
