= SS Cambridge (1886) =

Great eastern Ocean liner during 1886

History
- Name: 1886–1919: TSS Cambridge; 1919–1922: TSS Gul Nehad; 1922–1937: TSS Gulnihal
- Operator: 1886–1912: Great Eastern Railway; 1912–1919: Anglo-Ottoman Steamship Company; 1919–1922: Administration de Navire a Vapeur Ottomane, Galatea, Constantinople; 1922–1937: ?
- Port of registry: (United Kingdom)
- Route: 1886–1912: Harwich to Rotterdam and Antwerp
- Builder: Earle's Shipbuilding, Hull
- Launched: 11 October 1886
- Out of service: 1937
- Fate: Scrapped 1937

General characteristics
- Tonnage: 1,194 gross register tons (GRT)
- Length: 280.5 feet (85.5 m)
- Beam: 31 feet (9.4 m)
- Depth: 15.2 feet (4.6 m)
- Speed: 14.5 knots

TSS Cambridge was a passenger vessel built for the Great Eastern Railway in 1886.

== History ==
The ship was built by Earle's Shipbuilding in Hull for the Great Eastern Railway and launched on 11 October 1886. She was launched by the Mayor of Cambridge (Mr. W. B. Redfern), accompanied by the Deputy-Mayor (Mr. Alderman Deck).

She was placed on the Harwich to Hook of Holland route.

She was sold in 1912 to the Anglo-Ottoman Steamship Company. In 1919 she was acquired by the Administration de Navire a Vapeur Ottomane, Galatea, Constantinople and renamed Gul Nehad. She was sold again in 1922 and renamed Gulnihad. She was scrapped in 1937.
