= Grade II* listed buildings in Rother =

Rother shown within East Sussex

There are over 20,000 Grade II* listed buildings in England. This page is a list of these buildings in the district of Rother in East Sussex.

== Rother ==
Name	Location	Type	Completed (Note: The date given is the date used by Historic England as significant for the initial building or that of an important part in the structure's description.)	Date designated	Grid ref. (Note: The grid reference is based on the British national grid reference system, sometimes known as OSGB36, used by the Ordnance Survey.) Geo-coordinates	Entry number (Note: The "List Entry Number" is a unique number assigned to each listed building and scheduled monument by Historic England.)	Image
Court Lodge Farmhouse	Court Lodge, Ashburnham, Rother	Farmhouse	Early 17th century	3 August 1961	TQ6822016383; 50°55′21″N 0°23′31″E	1352831	Upload Photo
The former stables at Ashburnham Place	Ashburnham Place, Ashburnham, Rother	Stable	Early 18th century	3 August 1961	TQ6892014524; 50°54′20″N 0°24′04″E	1278909	The former stables at Ashburnham Place
Church of St John	Netherfield, Battle, Rother	Church	1859	13 May 1987	TQ7231918526; 50°56′26″N 0°27′05″E	1278194	Church of St John More images
Lewins Croft	Battle, Rother	House	Post 16th century	3 August 1961	TQ7475916194; 50°55′07″N 0°29′06″E	1044164	Upload Photo
Priory House Hotel	Battle, Rother	House	1700	3 August 1961	TQ7476715910; 50°54′58″N 0°29′06″E	1044216	Upload Photo
The Almonry	Battle, Rother	House	16th century	3 August 1961	TQ7464916078; 50°55′04″N 0°29′00″E	1044222	The Almonry More images
The Deanery including the Former Stables	Battle, Rother	Deanery	16th century	3 August 1961	TQ7502415850; 50°54′56″N 0°29′19″E	1352882	The Deanery including the Former Stables
The Pilgrims Rest Restaurant	Battle, Rother	Guest House	15th century	3 August 1961	TQ7480615794; 50°54′54″N 0°29′07″E	1230278	The Pilgrims Rest Restaurant More images
No. 18 High Street	Battle, Rother	House	18th century	3 August 1961	TQ7475615924; 50°54′59″N 0°29′05″E	1044217	Upload Photo
Knelle Dower Farmhouse	Beckley, Rother	Farmhouse	15th century	3 August 1961	TQ8387723680; 50°58′59″N 0°37′06″E	1277352	Upload Photo
Parish Church of St Giles	Bodiam, Rother	Parish Church	Early 14th century	3 August 1961	TQ7823726191; 51°00′27″N 0°32′21″E	1352896	Parish Church of St Giles More images
Brede Place	Brede, Rother	House	Pre 15th century	3 August 1961	TQ8363918324; 50°56′06″N 0°36′44″E	1044120	Brede Place More images
Reysons Farmhouse	Reysons Farm, Brede, Rother	Farmhouse	Medieval	13 May 1987	TQ8323719576; 50°56′47″N 0°36′25″E	1044107	Upload Photo
Brightling Needle	Brightling, Rother	Obelisk	Early 19th century	3 August 1961	TQ6700721209; 50°57′58″N 0°22′37″E	1044089	Brightling Needle More images
Brightling Park	Brightling, Rother	House	Early 18th century	14 September 1954	TQ6833720933; 50°57′48″N 0°23′45″E	1352916	Brightling Park More images
The Mausoleum of John Fuller in the Churchyard	Brightling, Rother	Mausoleum	1810	3 August 1961	TQ6837720980; 50°57′49″N 0°23′47″E	1232442	The Mausoleum of John Fuller in the Churchyard More images
The Observatory	Brightling, Rother	Observatory/House	Early 19th century	3 August 1961	TQ6706920748; 50°57′43″N 0°22′40″E	1277117	The Observatory More images
The Summerhouse or Alcove at Brightling Park to the west of the house	Brightling Park, Brightling, Rother	Summerhouse	Early 19th century	3 August 1961	TQ6774120760; 50°57′43″N 0°23′14″E	1044062	Upload Photo
The Temple at Brightling Park to the south west of the house	Brightling Park, Brightling, Rother	Folly	Early 19th century	3 August 1961	TQ6803220326; 50°57′28″N 0°23′28″E	1352934	The Temple at Brightling Park to the south west of the house More images
Burghurst	Burwash, Rother	House	18th century	3 August 1961	TQ6763824778; 50°59′53″N 0°23′15″E	1044051	Burghurst More images
Chateaubriand, Premises occupied by E Watson and Sons, E Workman Greengrocers and Villiers, High St	Burwash, Rother	House	18th century	3 August 1961	TQ6744324723; 50°59′51″N 0°23′05″E	1232850	Chateaubriand, Premises occupied by E Watson and Sons, E Workman Greengrocers and Villiers, High St More images
Glebe House	Burwash, Rother	House	1961	3 August 1961	TQ6823024997; 50°59′59″N 0°23′46″E	1232557	Upload Photo
The Old House	Burwash, Rother	House	Later-Post 15th century	3 August 1961	TQ6768924693; 50°59′50″N 0°23′18″E	1276843	Upload Photo
Parish Church of St Laurence	Catsfield, Rother	Parish Church	Early 12th century	3 August 1961	TQ7285513363; 50°53′38″N 0°27′23″E	1233163	Parish Church of St Laurence More images
Hye House	Crowhurst, Rother	House	1744	3 August 1961	TQ7563611725; 50°52′42″N 0°29′43″E	1233348	Upload Photo
The Old Manor House	Dallington, Rother	Wealden House	15th century	3 August 1961	TQ6572619030; 50°56′49″N 0°21′28″E	1233383	The Old Manor House More images
The Parish Church of St Giles	Dallington, Rother	Parish Church	Early 16th century	3 August 1961	TQ6578119059; 50°56′50″N 0°21′31″E	1233384	The Parish Church of St Giles More images
The Sugarloaf	The Sugarloaf, Dallington, Rother	Obelisk	Early 19th century	3 August 1961	TQ6692119550; 50°57′04″N 0°22′30″E	1233371	The Sugarloaf More images
The Parish Church of St Mary	East Guldeford, Rother	Church	1499-1505	3 August 1961	TQ9368821563; 50°57′39″N 0°45′24″E	1276544	The Parish Church of St Mary More images
Great Maxfield	Guestling, Rother	Jettied House	15th century	3 August 1961	TQ8339315222; 50°54′26″N 0°36′26″E	1365297	Upload Photo
Iridge Place	Hurst Green, Rother	House	18th century	3 August 1961	TQ7377726953; 51°00′57″N 0°28′34″E	1365292	Iridge Place More images
Periteau House, including the cellar under the garden	Winchelsea, Icklesham, Rother	House	18th century	3 August 1961	TQ9055517418; 50°55′29″N 0°42′36″E	1234400	Periteau House, including the cellar under the garden More images
Strand Platt, Rookery Lane	Winchelsea, Icklesham, Rother	House	18th century	3 August 1961	TQ9062417380; 50°55′28″N 0°42′39″E	1275964	Strand Platt, Rookery Lane More images
The Armoury	Winchelsea, Icklesham, Rother	House	Medieval	3 August 1961	TQ9056117459; 50°55′30″N 0°42′36″E	1234432	The Armoury More images
The Five Houses, Nos 4 & 5, Higham Green	Winchelsea, Icklesham, Rother	House	17th century	3 August 1961	TQ9046717579; 50°55′34″N 0°42′32″E	1234608	The Five Houses, Nos 4 & 5, Higham Green
The Five Houses, Nos 1-3, North St	Winchelsea, Icklesham, Rother	House	17th century	3 August 1961	TQ9047217588; 50°55′35″N 0°42′32″E	1234560	The Five Houses, Nos 1-3, North St More images
Wickham Manor House	Winchelsea, Icklesham, Rother	House	Early 16th century	3 August 1961	TQ8983616489; 50°55′00″N 0°41′57″E	1234746	Wickham Manor House More images
No. 1-10 Barrack Square	Winchelsea, Icklesham, Rother	House	18th century	3 August 1961	TQ9063817478; 50°55′31″N 0°42′40″E	1234386	No. 1-10 Barrack Square More images
Oxenbridge Farmhouse	Iden, Rother	Farmhouse	Early 15th century	3 August 1961	TQ9165824567; 50°59′19″N 0°43′46″E	1234970	Oxenbridge Farmhouse More images
Mountfield Court	Mountfield, Rother	House	Late 17th century or Early 18th century	3 August 1961	TQ7358520854; 50°57′39″N 0°28′14″E	1234935	Mountfield Court More images
Parish Church of All Saints	Mountfield, Rother	Parish Church	Early 12th century	3 August 1961	TQ7347320276; 50°57′21″N 0°28′07″E	1275863	Parish Church of All Saints More images
Church House	Northiam	House	Late 18th century or Early 19th century	3 August 1961	TQ8306224552; 50°59′29″N 0°36′26″E	1235021	Church House
Newenden Bridge	Northiam	Bridge	1706	3 August 1961	TQ8352127039; 51°00′48″N 0°36′54″E	1217121	Newenden Bridge More images
Oakside	Northiam	House	18th century	3 August 1961	TQ8294424475; 50°59′26″N 0°36′19″E	1216981	Oakside
Oasthouses and Barn at Great Dixter to the North West of the House	Northiam	Oasthouse	Oasthouse 18th century, barn 15th century	20 May 1976	TQ8195725164; 50°59′50″N 0°35′30″E	1216899	Oasthouses and Barn at Great Dixter to the North West of the House More images
Strawberry Hole	Strawberry Hole, Northiam, Rother	House	Later-Post 15th century	3 August 1961	TQ8208724143; 50°59′16″N 0°35′35″E	1235029	Strawberry Hole
The Parish Church of St Mary (including the Frewen Mausoleum)	Northiam, Rother	Parish Church	Norman	3 August 1961	TQ8300824517; 50°59′27″N 0°36′23″E	1275827	The Parish Church of St Mary (including the Frewen Mausoleum) More images
Flackley Ash Hotel	Flackley Ash, Peasmarsh, Rother	House	18th century	3 August 1961	TQ8804123310; 50°58′43″N 0°40′38″E	1275455	Flackley Ash Hotel More images
Woodside	Peasmarsh, Rother	House	c. 1790	3 August 1961	TQ8853123097; 50°58′35″N 0°41′03″E	1217327	Upload Photo
Church Farmhouse	Church Farm, Penhurst, Rother	Farmhouse	Early 17th century	3 August 1961	TQ6944016509; 50°55′23″N 0°24′34″E	1217564	Upload Photo
Bank Chambers (the Justices' Clerk's Offices)	Rye, Rother	Legal Chambers	18th century	12 October 1951	TQ9199820348; 50°57′02″N 0°43′55″E	1251665	Bank Chambers (the Justices' Clerk's Offices) More images
Cobble Cottage, 18, West St	Rye, Rother	House	Refaced early 19th century	12 October 1951	TQ9202020324; 50°57′01″N 0°43′56″E	1252157	Cobble Cottage, 18, West St More images
Flushing Inn & 3, Monks Way	Rye, Rother	House	16th century	12 October 1951	TQ9218020347; 50°57′02″N 0°44′05″E	1251880	Flushing Inn & 3, Monks Way More images
Hartshorn House 31, Mermaid St	Rye, Rother	House	16th century	12 October 1951	TQ9195620280; 50°57′00″N 0°43′53″E	1251959	Hartshorn House 31, Mermaid St More images
Lamb House	Rye, Rother	House	Beginning of the 18th century	12 October 1951	TQ9204820272; 50°57′00″N 0°43′58″E	1252151	Lamb House More images
The Mermaid Inn	Rye, Rother	House	18th century	12 October 1951	TQ9200820293; 50°57′00″N 0°43′56″E	1251961	The Mermaid Inn More images
St Anthony of Padua (house in Church Square, Rye)	Rye, Rother	Jettied House	15th century	12 October 1951	TQ9210520247; 50°56′59″N 0°44′01″E	1262779	St Anthony of Padua (house in Church Square, Rye) More images
The Town Hall	Rye, Rother	Town Hall	1831	12 October 1951	TQ9215120332; 50°57′01″N 0°44′03″E	1251881	The Town Hall More images
The Water Tower (standing in the North East Corner of the Churchyard)	Rye, Rother	Water Tower	1733-1735	12 October 1951	TQ9217620322; 50°57′01″N 0°44′04″E	1044326	The Water Tower (standing in the North East Corner of the Churchyard) More images
No. 1 East Street and 104 and 104A High Street	Rye, Rother	House	Late 18th century or early 19th century	12 October 1951	TQ9215320426; 50°57′04″N 0°44′03″E	1251729	No. 1 East Street and 104 and 104A High Street More images
Cordbatt Cottage	Lea Farm, Rye Foreign, Rother	House	Early 19th century	13 May 1987	TQ9010422553; 50°58′16″N 0°42′23″E	1275286	Cordbatt Cottage
Robertsbridge Abbey	Robertsbridge, Salehurst and Robertsbridge, Rother	Abbey ruins	1176	3 August 1961	TQ7546123825; 50°59′14″N 0°29′55″E	1274121	Robertsbridge Abbey More images
Great Wigsell	Bodiam, Salehurst and Robertsbridge, Rother	House	Early 17th century	3 August 1961	TQ7607227352; 51°01′07″N 0°30′32″E	1221404	Great Wigsell More images
Monk's Cottage	Robertsbridge, Salehurst and Robertsbridge, Rother	House	16th century	3 August 1961	TQ7387024117; 50°59′25″N 0°28′34″E	1221521	Monk's Cottage More images
Rosebank	Robertsbridge, Salehurst and Robertsbridge, Rother	House	16th century	3 August 1961	TQ7382023727; 50°59′12″N 0°28′31″E	1221397	Rosebank More images
The Seven Stars Inn (Seven Sisters)	Robertsbridge, Salehurst and Robertsbridge, Rother	Wealden House	14th century	3 August 1961	TQ7378923622; 50°59′09″N 0°28′29″E	1275146	The Seven Stars Inn (Seven Sisters) More images
Durhamford Manor	Sedlescombe, Rother	Jettied House	Early 16th century	3 August 1961	TQ7728418852; 50°56′31″N 0°31′19″E	1222027	Durhamford Manor More images
The Parish Church of St John the Baptist	Sedlescombe, Rother	Parish Church	Early 15th century	3 August 1961	TQ7771218803; 50°56′29″N 0°31′41″E	1275087	The Parish Church of St John the Baptist More images
Courthorpes & Whiligh	Ticehurst, Rother	House	1586	3 August 1961	TQ6566531255; 51°03′24″N 0°21′45″E	1237733	Courthorpes & Whiligh More images
Dunsters Mill House	Three Leg Cross, Ticehurst, Rother	House	Later-Post 15th century	3 August 1961	TQ6896231991; 51°03′45″N 0°24′35″E	1222585	Upload Photo
The Parish Church of St Mary	Ticehurst, Rother	Parish Church	Medieval	3 August 1961	TQ6887930101; 51°02′44″N 0°24′28″E	1222324	The Parish Church of St Mary More images
Wardsbrook Farmhouse	Ticehurst, Rother	Farmhouse	16th century	3 August 1961	TQ6872429102; 51°02′11″N 0°24′18″E	1237751	Upload Photo
Knellstone	Udimore, Rother	House	15th century	3 August 1961	TQ8791718710; 50°56′14″N 0°40′23″E	1237763	Upload Photo
The Hammonds	Udimore, Rother	Farmhouse	Late 17th century	3 August 1961	TQ8848219341; 50°56′34″N 0°40′54″E	1238077	Upload Photo
The Parish Church of St Mary Magdalen	Whatlington, Rother	Parish Church	13th century	3 August 1961	TQ7605618225; 50°56′12″N 0°30′16″E	1238301	The Parish Church of St Mary Magdalen More images
Parish Church of St Peter	Bexhill-on-Sea	Church	Late 11th century or early 12th century	11 May 1949	TQ7460708096; 50°50′46″N 0°28′44″E	1352817	Parish Church of St Peter More images
Burwash War Memorial	Burwash	War memorial	1920	25 August 1998	TQ6765424754; 50°59′52″N 0°23′16″E	1376156	Burwash War Memorial More images
Etchingham Stationmaster's House	Etchingham, Rother	House	1852	13 May 1987	TQ7142226308; 51°00′38″N 0°26′32″E	1233612	Etchingham Stationmaster's House More images
