= Murder of Alan Grebell =

1743 murder of the Deputy Mayor of Rye, Sussex, England

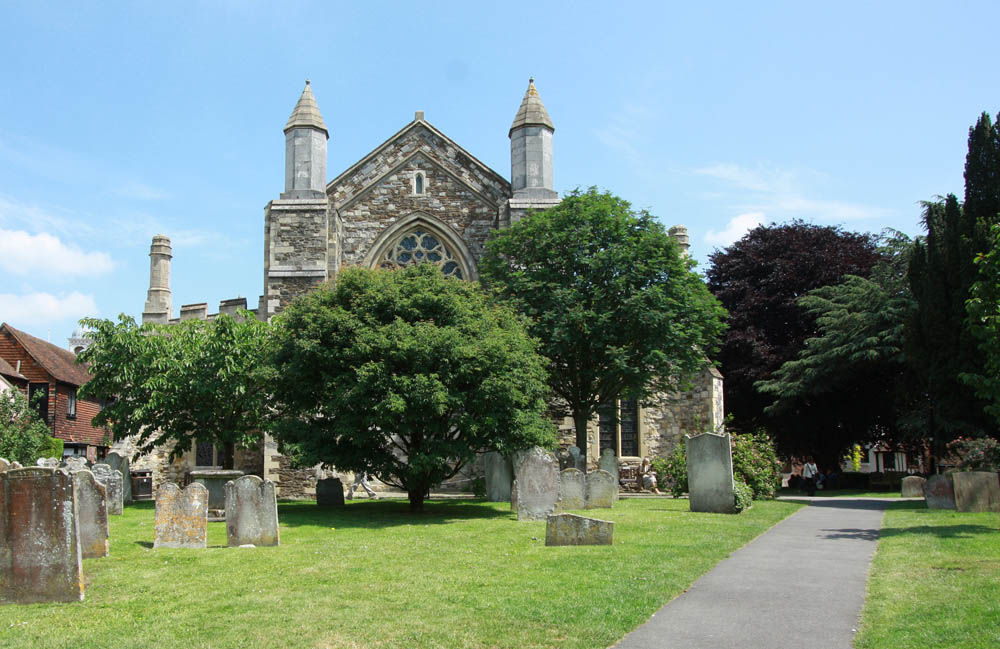
- The churchyard of St Mary's, the site of Alan Grebell's murder
- Location: Churchyard of St Mary's, Rye
- Date: 16 March 1743; Around midnight
- Victim: Alan Grebell
- Assailant: John Breads
- Motive: Intent to kill James Lamb
- Verdict: Guilty
- Convictions: Murder
- Judge: James Lamb

After midnight on 17 March 1743, 50-year-old Alan Grebell, the Deputy Mayor of Rye, Sussex in England, was stabbed in the churchyard of St Mary's, Rye by John Breads (or Breeds), who was a butcher, former victualler, and owner of the town's Flushing Inn. Breads had intended to stab and kill the Mayor of Rye, James Lamb. However, he instead mistakenly stabbed Lamb's brother-in-law Grebell.

Breads was arraigned on 25 May 1743 in a trial with Lamb himself as judge. He was found guilty of murder, and on 8 June was hanged before being gibbeted on what would come to be known as Gibbet Marsh, where his gibbet remained standing for over 20 years. The gibbet was buried but later exhumed by the Town Corporation of Rye. His skull remained in the gibbet cage and this remains the case today, the cage and skull being stored in Rye Town Hall and a replica gibbet cage viewable at Rye Castle.

== Background ==
The murder took place following the end of the administration of Sir Robert Walpole in the United Kingdom in 1742. Rye was largely led by James Lamb, the Mayor of Rye who was also the owner of Lamb House in the town, as well as his deputy Alan Grebell, his 50-year-old brother-in-law, who lived opposite his house. Grebell had previously been mayor on a number of occasions, and was the heir of a leading local merchant family.

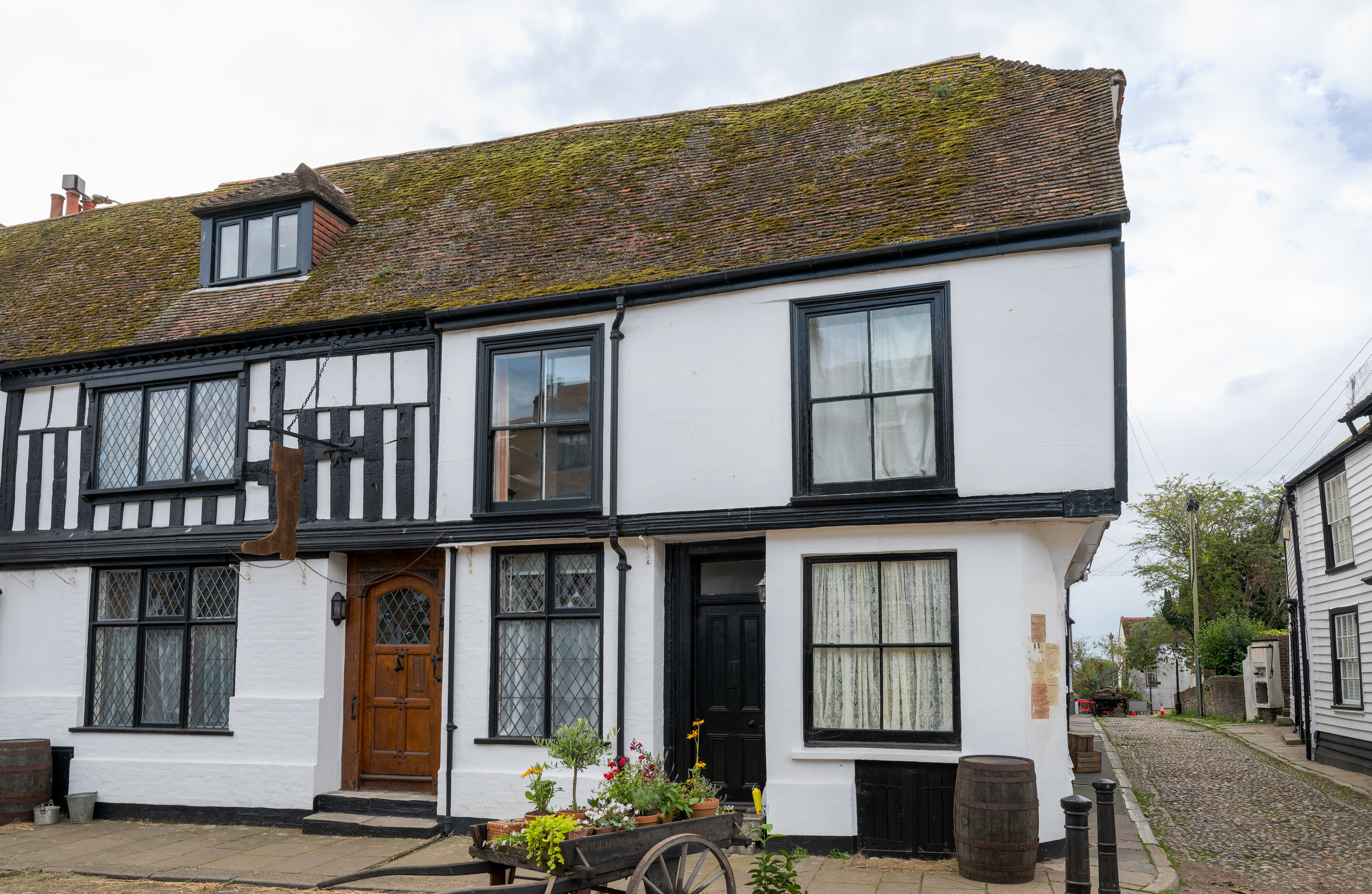
John Breads, the murderer, owned the Flushing Inn in Rye.

John Breads was a butcher who also owned the Flushing Inn on Market Street, Rye. He had a wife, Mary Breads, and two sons; John and Richard. There were two butchers named John Breads in the town, which causes confusion for present-day scholars; the younger Breads who was a butcher throughout his life, and the older Breads who switched jobs from victualler to butcher when leasing his inn to one John Igglesdon in December 1738. The latter Breads was the murderer. Records show that a man named John Breads paid a £1.1s fine to the town chamberlain for an unknown offence in 1730, and a butcher named "John Breads junior", likely the younger Breads, was presented for using three light weights in 1737, for which a fine was not recorded. Breads's wife died and was buried in February 1739. According to private correspondence by one Rye resident, lawyer Henry Dodson, Breads had previously been imprisoned for "feigned madness".

=== 16 March 1743 ===
As a celebration of Lamb's third son John's appointment to the customs service, Lamb was invited to dinner on a revenue sloop for 16 March 1743 (1742 O.S.). However, on the day of this dinner Lamb felt ill and instead sent Grebell. Local pamphlets detail that Grebell borrowed Lamb's red mayoral cloak for the duration of that evening, though this is not backed up by newspaper reports of the murder.

It was stated in newspaper reports that prior to Grebell's murder, Breads attacked another man who he later said he mistook for Ralph Norton, one of the richest men in the town. This may have been William Fowl, who he purportedly met in Dead Man's Lane, though this man was from a poor fishing family, and so was unlikely to have been confused with Norton.

== Murder of Alan Grebell ==
The narrative of Grebell's murder differs between national newspapers and the popular version of events local pamphlets and guides. John Breads lay waiting in the churchyard of St Mary's, Rye, waiting for the return of Lamb, whom he believed had gone to the dinner. At around midnight according to local pamphlets, or according to newspaper reports between 2 am and 3 am on 17 March, Grebell walked through the churchyard, returning from the dinner. The pamphlets and newspapers both state that Breads mistook Grebell for Lamb, and accidentally stabbed the former instead. The newspapers wrote that Breads met Grebell and stabbed him twice in the left breast, with one wound perforating his thorax and the other stabbing somewhat lower and closer to his arm. The papers wrote that both wounds punctured his left lung, and that he died quickly of blood loss.

The popular version of events as portrayed in local pamphlets instead state that Bread mistook Grebell for Lamb because of the swapped cloak, and that Grebell did not realise that he had been stabbed by Breads, only feeling that he had been knocked; on returning home, Grebell purportedly sent his servant to bed, and himself sat down by the fire in a chair where he bled to death.

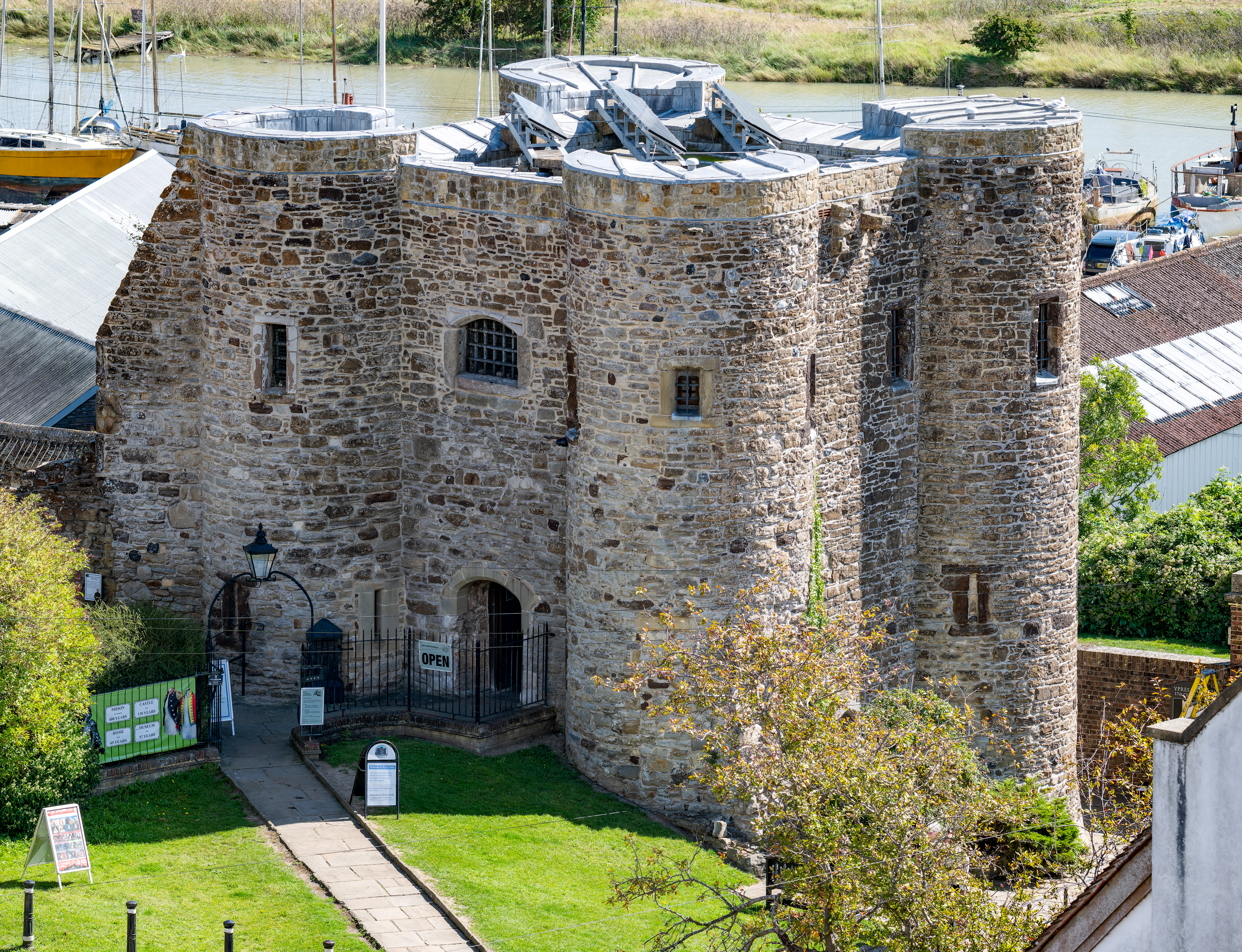
Breads was imprisoned for three months in Ypres Tower before his trial

According to the local pamphlets, after dreaming of his late wife warning him that harm had been caused to her brother, Grebell, Lamb found Grebell's corpse sitting upright in the chair at daybreak. Lamb served as coroner, though records of the inquest do not survive. Surviving vouchers evidence that there was a medical examination of Grebell's corpse, though the coroner's jury did not indict Breads. By the account of the pamphlets, Grebell's servant was initially under suspicion. One later 19th-century source, by William Holloway, described that Breads was seen around Rye drunk and half-clothed, dancing and shouting "butchers should kill lambs!" Paul Monod in 2003 disputed this claim, stating that it was more likely later fabricated for the story. Breads was arrested. He waited for trial imprisoned in Ypres Tower – which had not housed a prisoner for many years prior – for three months. The trial was delayed by two months, likely due to Lamb's attempt to have Breads tried in Rye which may have been against the wishes of other legal authorities. In gaol, he was kept in leg irons, chains, and staples, remaining under close watch.

== Trial and execution of John Breads ==
Because the town hall was under construction, the court took place at Lamb's warehouse in the Strand. The trial was overseen by Lamb himself as judge; Robert Monypenny, legal counsel for Dover at the time, wrote that Whig MP for Rye Phillips Gybbon, and Lord Chancellor Hardwicke had both attempted to persuade Lamb not to preside over the trial, to no avail. Peter Burrell, MP for Haslemere, was more supportive. Lamb was accompanied by three jurats; Ralph Norton (whom Breads had said he had intended to attack), John Slade and Henry Carleton. The legal counsel of the town, John Kirke, was absent, and as such counsellor John Knowler was brought in from Canterbury by obligation. On 25 May, Breads was indicted, and arraigned for murder. A 14-person grand jury, which included Mermaid Tavern owner William Rockett, determined Breads's indictment to be a true bill, and then a petit jury of 12 people heard the case. One newspaper report details that the trial lasted 11.5 hours, despite the average trial length at this time being around 0.5 hours. No depositions survive for the case, nor any recorded testimonies, and no witnesses are known. Breads defended himself, pleading not guilty, and did not use a lawyer. A newspaper account details that he argued that he was "in Distraction", or temporarily insane, when committing the murder; this could have worked as a legitimate legal defence at this time, though the defence was denied by Lamb.

Breads was convicted for Grebell's murder, though the jury declared that Breads had no property in an attempt to ensure that Breads's family would retain his assets. Pamphlets describe that before his sentencing Breads threatened Lamb; "I did not mean to kill Mr Grebell. It was you I meant it for and I would murder you now, if I could!" However, the newspaper reports of the trial do not include any threats from Breads. He was then sentenced to death by hanging and then gibbeting.

During the trial, 5s worth of wine was served, and following the trial, 40 gentlemen and 25 servants held a dinner at the Red Lion inn, spending £14.11.10, and payments were given to participants for their expenses of as much as £21.

On 8 June 1743, John Breads was hanged on the west side of Rye, "upon the Salts without the Strand Gate of the Town".

== Gibbeting of John Breads ==
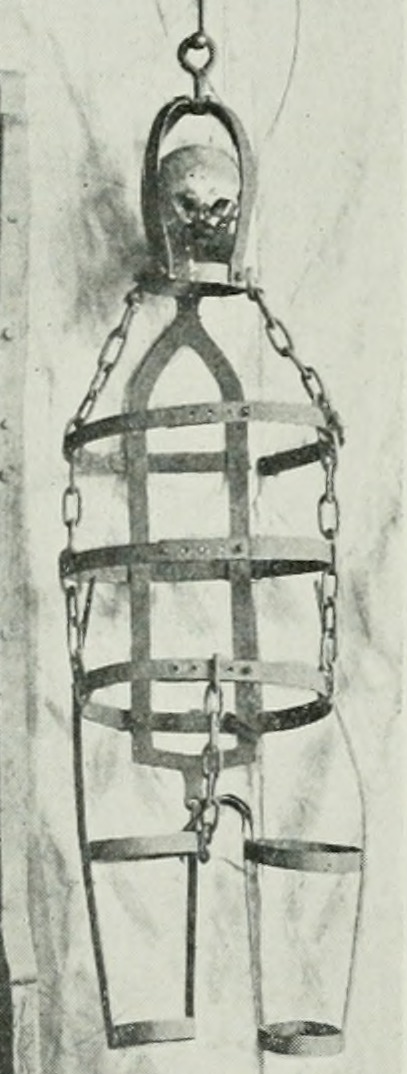
A c. 1900 photograph of John Breads's skull in his gibbet cage

A gibbet cage was constructed for Breads on 5 June; it cost 15s despite the budget only allowing 8s.2d. Breads was gibbeted near the scaffold where he was hanged; the location would come to be known as Gibbet Marsh, where it stood for over 20 years. During this time, its hook would have regularly caused an unsettling and eerie noise when the cage was blown by the wind.

The headpiece, to which is fastened a hook, consists of four curved vertical straps as well as a neck brace which connects these straps at the bottom. The torso section consists of three wide hoops that wrap around and are connected by the links of an iron chain, and these hoops are held up by solid straps on the back. Breads's arms likely fit inside the torso section, as the gibbet iron lacks separate arm pieces. More chain forms the gusset of the gibbet iron. The legs both have iron straps on the outside and inside of each leg, held together each by two hoops.

The town corporation of Rye took control of his estate and went about educating his two children, putting them in the care of one Edward Pearson. The town's interest in Breads' estate was revived in late 1743 when Pearson and his wife began a lawsuit against Igglesdon, claiming that they were the Flushing Inn's legitimate tenants. On 27 February 1744, Mayor Lamb as well as jurats Nathaniel Pigram and Samuel Jeake III began an inquiry to find Breads's full estate. The Pearsons lost the lawsuit, and by 15 June the town corporation was leasing the inn.

The murder, execution and gibbeting was reported on by the General Evening Post and the Daily Post in March and May 1743, and then the Daily Post published an update report that June.

The body of Breads slowly broke down over time, and the majority of his skeleton, save for his skull, dissipated into the marsh. The cage was eventually buried, with what was left of Breads's remains still inside. The Town Corporation of Rye eventually dug up and retrieved the cage, which was then moved inside the parish church. Here, elderly women stole several of his bones in an attempt to create a cure for rheumatism.

The gibbet finally was taken to Rye Town Hall. In 2004, Breads's gibbet iron and his skull, still inside it, were located in a small upstairs room in Rye town hall, which was an area not accessible to the public. By this time, the skull had been in the cage for over 250 years. The hook of the gibbet cage is now well-worn. In 2013, there was a replica being used at the town's heritage centre, and there was ongoing discussion on how the gibbet cage could be sensitively displayed. By 2015, the replica of the gibbet resided in Rye Castle Museum, and it remains there as of 2023.

== Legacy ==
Grebell's memorial, in Rye church, reads:

Here Lyeth the Body of ALLEN GREBELL Esqr. Who after having served the Office of Mayor of this Town for Ten Years, with the Greatest Honour and Integrity, fell by the Cruel Stab of a Sanguinary Butcher on the 17th of March 1742 Aged 50. He left Issue one Son & one Daughter.

Breads's son Richard would later in life obtain a license for the Two Brewers Inn, which is now the Queen's Head in the Landgate in Rye. He remained illiterate, marking his license instead of signing it.

The story of the murder was covered, with varying accuracy, in William Holloway's The History and Antiquities of the Ancient Town and Port of Rye (1847), Leopold Amon Vidler's New History of Rye (1934), and E. F. Benson's Final Edition (1940). The latter adds ghost stories to the account. The chair in which Grebell purportedly died was located in the Garden Room at Lamb House, and was under Benson's ownership in 1940. A bombing raid during World War II destroyed it.

On 17 March 2023, for the 280th anniversary of Grebell's murder, Rye commemorated the occasion with a march led by drummers, an address by the town crier Paul Goring and mayor Andi Rivett, and prayers at St Mary's led by Reverend Christopher Breeds before the laying of a wreath at Grebell's tombstone.

== Sources ==
- Monod, Paul Kléber (2003). The Murder of Mr. Grebell: Madness and Civility in an English Town. Yale University Press. ISBN 9780300099850.
- Tarlow, Sarah (1 December 2014). "The Technology of the Gibbet". International Journal of Historical Archaeology. 18 (4). doi:10.1007/s10761-014-0275-0. ISSN 1092-7697. PMC 4372825. PMID 25834380.
