= Rye Town Hall, East Sussex =

Municipal building in Rye, East Sussex, England

Rye Town Hall
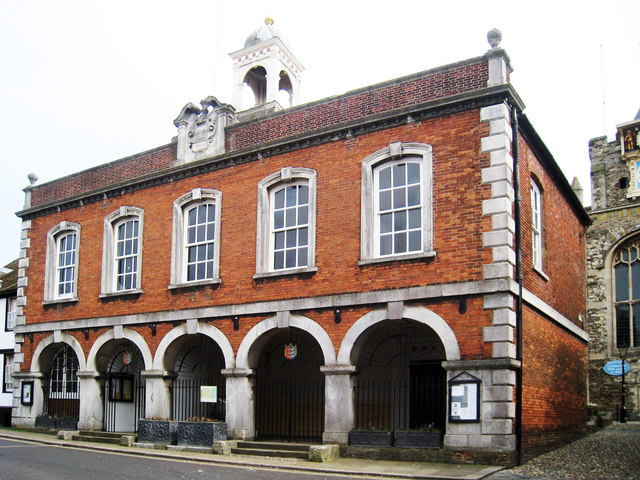
- Rye Town Hall

- Shown in East Sussex
- 50.9503°N 0.7342°E
- Location: Market Street, Rye

History
- Built: 1743

Site notes
- Architect: Andrews Jelfe
- Architectural style: Neoclassical style

Listed Building – Grade II*
- Official name: The Town Hall
- Designated: 12 October 1951
- Reference no.: 1251881

Rye Town Hall is a municipal building in Market Street, Rye, East Sussex, England. The building, which is the meeting place of Rye Town Council, is a Grade II* listed building.

== History ==
The first town hall was a medieval structure which was burnt down by French forces under the command of the Admiral of France, Jean de Vienne, in summer 1377 during the Hundred Years' War. A second structure was erected on the site in Market Street to accommodate the courts when they relocated from Rye Castle in the early fifteenth century.

The current structure was designed by Andrews Jelfe in the neoclassical style, built in red brick with Portland stone dressings and was completed in 1743. The design involved a symmetrical main frontage with five bays facing onto Market Street; the ground floor was arcaded, so that markets could be held, with an assembly hall on the first floor. The openings on the ground floor incorporated architraves, keystones and wrought iron gates. On the first floor, there were five segmental sash windows with architraves and keystones and, at roof level, there was a parapet and a central panel which contained a carving of the borough coat of arms and was flanked by pilasters supporting a broken pediment. There was also a cupola in the centre of the roof.

Internally, the principal room was the courtroom, which also served as a council chamber, on the first floor. Wooden boards, which recorded the names of mayors of Rye since the 13th century, were also installed in the council chamber. A small museum store was established in the attic: items collected included a gibbet cage which was used to display the hanged body of the murderer John Breads in 1742, and a pillory which was last used to punish a local publican, who had assisted the escape of the French General Armand Philippon, in 1813 during the Napoleonic Wars. The two left hand openings on the ground floor were infilled, sometime after 1825, to form a magistrates' room. In January 1929, the town hall was the venue for the Board of Trade inquiry into the loss of the lifeboat, Mary Stanford, which had capsized with the loss of 15 people two months earlier.

The building continued to serve as the headquarters of Rye Borough Council for much of the 20th century, but ceased to be the local seat of government when the enlarged Rother District Council was formed in 1974. The building, instead became the offices and meeting place of Rye Town Council. On 15 October 1990, the singer, Paul McCartney and his wife, Linda, led a march from the town hall to Rye Memorial Hospital as part of a campaign, which was ultimately successful, to save the hospital from closure. The building continued to be used as a magistrates' court until 1992. A nativity scene, created by the local animator and cartoonist, John Ryan, and intended to re-create the Adoration of the Magi by Gentile da Fabriano, was first unveiled in the right hand opening on the ground floor in December 1996, and then subsequently re-unveiled annually in December each year.

Works of art in the town hall included a portrait by Charles Jervas of the local member of parliament, Phillips Gybbon.

== See also ==
- Grade II* listed buildings in Rother
