= Mary Stormont =

English painter

Mary Elizabeth Stormont (nee Sapsworth; 2 January 1871 – 11 October 1962) was a British painter.

== Life ==
Mary Elizabeth Sapsworth was born in London, England on 2 January 1871. She was the daughter of George Sapsworth, leather merchant, and Elizabeth Deur, and elder sister to Katherine Emma Maltwood.

She married Howard Gull Stormont, an artist, in 1898, against the wishes of her parents. The couple eloped to Rye. They lived in Ypres Studio, Rye, East Sussex and they became the focus in Rye for visiting artists. In the 1920s she was a founder member of the Rye Art Club (under the patronage of author Henry James). The Rye Society of Artists continues the ethos and traditions of the founder members to this day.

She exhibited throughout her life, showing regularly at many locations, notably the Royal Academy, the Bruton Galleries (London), Walker Art Gallery (Liverpool), Royal Institute and the Ridley Art Club (Grafton Galleries). She first exhibited at the Royal Academy Summer Exhibition in 1899 with an oil painting, A wayside inn. In the following year she exhibited both an oil painting and a watercolour. She continued to exhibit in at least 17 Royal Academy Exhibitions, her last being in 1940.

She was especially sought after for her flower paintings but also painted interiors and landscapes.

The water colour drawing, Dimant-Sur-Meuse, which we give this month as a coloured supplement, well represents the colours of Mrs. Mary Stormont,…Apart from the excellence of the handling and the very good colour, the originality of this composition contributes not a little to its charm.

— The Studio

As well as a painter, Stormont was an accomplished photographer. She chose women on the land and beaches around Rye as her subjects.

Observing women at work in a narrative context is a returning theme throughout her photographic work to date. She wants to tell visual stories in long form photo journalistic essays, sometimes shot over a period of years by returning to the same place or through exploring unexpected common links between people from different places.

— Susan Benn

After her husband died in 1935 Stormont continued to live in Ypres Studio. In 1957 she founded the Rye Art Gallery Trust to promote interest in art through lessons, lectures and exhibitions.

She died in Battle, Sussex on 11 October 1962 and was buried in Rye. On her death she bequeathed Ypres Studio, approximately 100 art works, and money to the Rye Gallery Trust. The Ypres Studio became The Rye Art Gallery and opened in 1965. The works she donated form the core of its permanent collection, which is housed in The Stormont Studio of the Rye Art Gallery. The permanent collection includes works by artists associated with Rye, such as Edward Burra and Paul Nash, and also a portrait of her painted by George James Coates.
