= The Olde Bell, Rye =

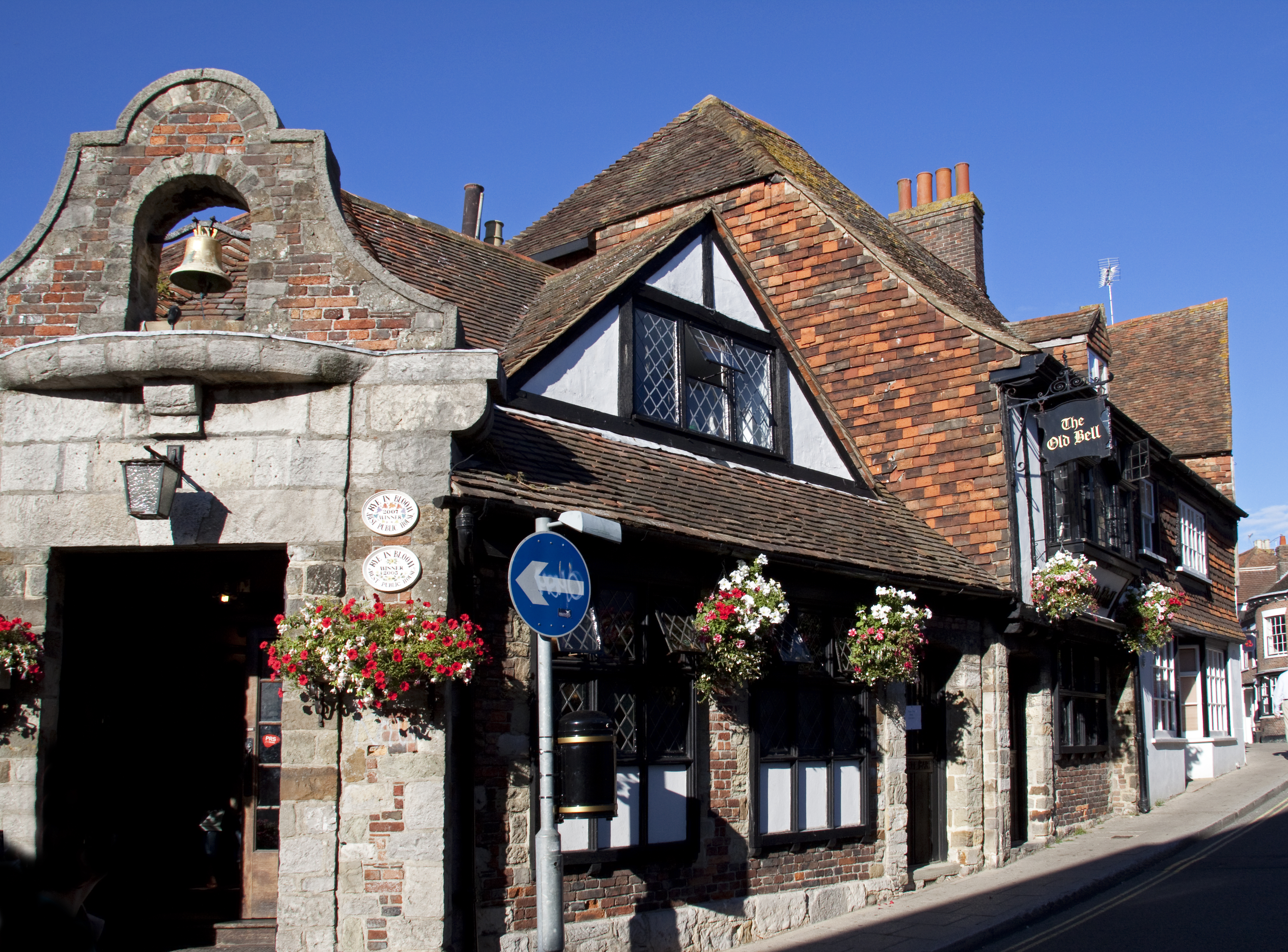

- Location within East Sussex
- 50°57′2″N 0°43′53″E
- Type: Inn
- Location: High Street, Rye
- OS grid reference: TQ9197820366

History
- Built: 1390

Site notes
- Area: East Sussex
- Architectural style: Timber framed

Listed Building – Grade II
- Official name: The Mint, Ye Olde Bell Inn
- Designated: 11 September 1972
- Reference no.: 1251623

The Olde Bell inn, also known as Ye Olde Bell, is a Grade II listed historical inn in Rye, East Sussex. It was built in 1390. It has a turbulent history and was once used for smuggling, connected by a secret tunnel with the nearby Mermaid Inn to the south. It was used by the infamous Hawkhurst Gang in the 1730s and 1740s who moved goods along the tunnel from the Mermaid to a revolving cupboard in the Old Bell for a quick getaway. The inn has two separate bar areas with original oak beams and a terrace with an 80-year-old Wysteria tree.
