= John Fuller (1680–1745) =

John Fuller FRS (1680 – 4 August 1745) was a British landowner, MP and Jamaican plantation owner.

He was the eldest son of John Fuller of Tanners, Waldron, Sussex. He developed the Heathfield ironworks started by his father into a successful operation.

He was elected a Fellow of the Royal Society in 1704. In 1713 he was elected Member of Parliament for Sussex, sitting until 1715.

He died in 1745. He had married Elizabeth, the daughter and coheiress of plantation owner Fulke Rose of St. Catherine, Jamaica, whose Jamaican estate they inherited. They lived at Rose Hill, now called Brightling Park, in Brightling, Sussex and had 9 sons (3 of whom predeceased him) and 1 daughter. Rose Hill passed to his eldest son John jnr and the Jamaican plantation to his second son Rose. When John jnr died 10 years later, Rose Hill and the foundry also passed to Rose.
