= Rye, East Sussex =

Town in East Sussex, England

Coordinates: 50.95°N 0.73°E

Rye
- The Ypres tower, Rother, Rye Harbour and marshes seen from the tower of St Mary's Church, Rye

- Location within East Sussex
- Area: 4.2 km^{2} (1.6 sq mi)
- Population: 4,480 (2021 Census)
  - Density: 2,810/sq mi (1,080/km^{2})
- OS grid reference: TQ920206
  - London: 53 miles (85 km) NW
- Civil parish: Rye
- District: Rother
- Shire county: East Sussex
- Region: South East
- Country: England
- Sovereign state: United Kingdom
- Post town: RYE
- Postcode district: TN31
- Dialling code: 01797
- Police: Sussex
- Fire: East Sussex
- Ambulance: South East Coast
- UK Parliament: Hastings and Rye
- Website: Town Council

Rye is a town and civil parish in the Rother district of East Sussex, England, two miles (three kilometres) from the English Channel at the confluence of three rivers: the Rother, the Tillingham and the Brede. In the mid-twelfth century, it was an important member of the mediaeval Cinque Ports confederation, it was at the head of an embayment of the English Channel, and almost entirely surrounded by the sea. Over the subsequent centuries, the coastline has moved further away due to a combination of natural silting up from storm damage, changes in the flow of the River Rother, and tidal changes, along with deliberate land reclamation from the sea.

At the 2021 census, Rye had a population of 4,480. Its historical association with the sea has included providing ships for the service of the Crown in time of war, and being involved in smuggling. The notorious Hawkhurst Gang used its ancient inns The Mermaid Inn and The Olde Bell Inn, which are said to be connected to each other by a secret passageway.

Those historic roots and its charm make it a tourist destination, with hotels, guest houses, B&Bs, tea rooms, and restaurants. Rye has a small fishing fleet, and Rye Harbour has facilities for yachts and other vessels.

== History ==
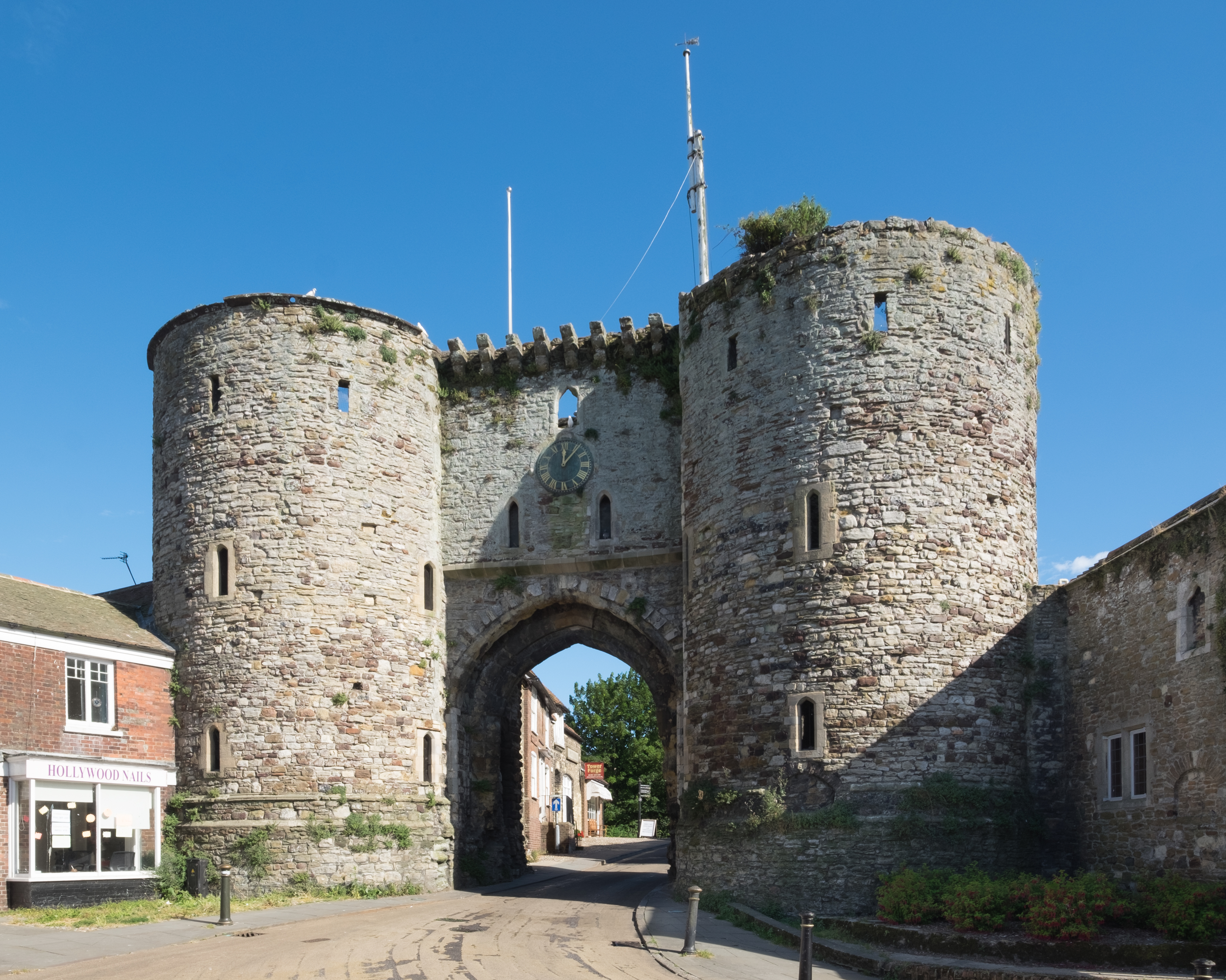
The Landgate

Location of medieval Rye shown relative to the neighbouring county of Kent

The name of Rye is believed to come from the West Saxon ieg meaning island. Medieval maps show that Rye was originally located on a huge embayment of the English Channel called the Rye Camber, which provided a safe anchorage and harbour. Probably as early as Roman times, Rye was important as a place of shipment and storage of iron from the Wealden iron industry.

Rye, as part of the Saxon Manor of Rameslie, was given to the Benedictine Abbey of Fécamp in Normandy by King Æthelred; it was to remain in Norman hands until 1247. The town of Rye is recorded in the 1086 Domesday Book as possessing 189 households, marking it as a significant settlement at the time. The cellars of the Mermaid Inn date from 1156.

As one of the two "Antient Townes" (Winchelsea being the other), Rye was to become a limb of the Cinque Ports Confederation by 1189, and subsequently a full member. The protection of the town as one of the Cinque Ports was very important, due to the commerce that trading brought. One of the oldest buildings in Rye is Ypres Tower, which was built in 1249 as "Baddings Tower", to defend the town from the French, and was later named after its owner, John de Ypres. It is now part of the Rye Museum.

Rye received its charter from King Edward I in 1289, and acquired privileges and tax exemptions in return for ship-service for the crown. The "Landgate" (the only surviving one of four original fortified entrances to Rye) dates from 1329 in the early years of the reign of King Edward III. It is suitable only for light vehicles. In 2015, some 25 tonnes of pigeon excrement that had built up had to be removed from Landgate Arch for fear of damaging the ancient structure.

The River Rother originally took an easterly course to flow into the sea near what is now New Romney. However, the violent storms in the 13th century (particularly in 1250 and 1287) cut the town off from the sea, destroyed Old Winchelsea, and changed the course of the Rother. Then the sea and the river combined in about 1375 to destroy the eastern part of the town and ships began use the current area (the Strand) to unload their cargoes. Two years later, the town was sacked and burnt by the French, and it was ordered that the town walls be completed, as a defence against foreign raiders.

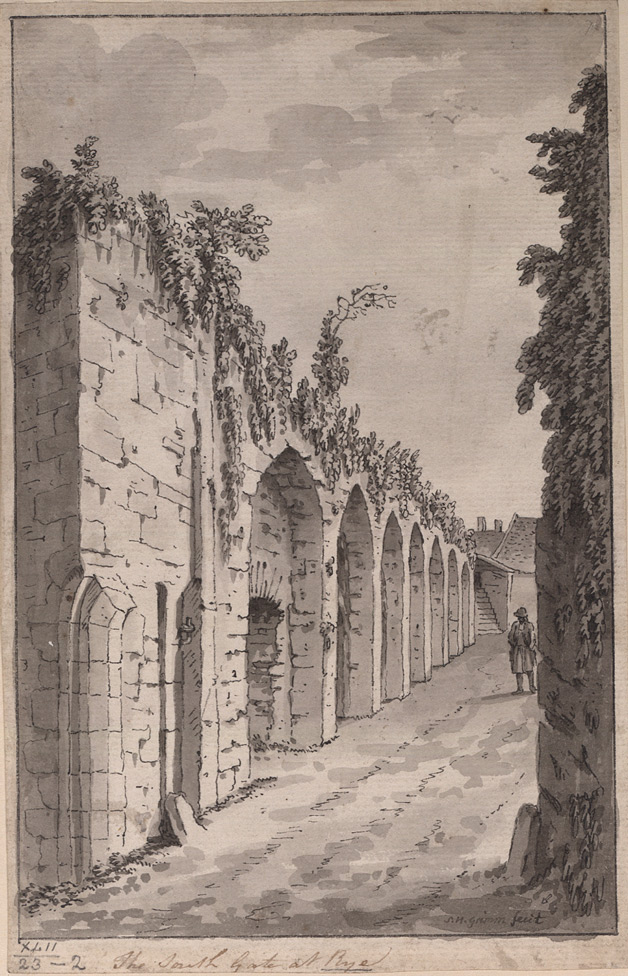
The South Gate at Rye, 1785, by Samuel Hieronymus Grimm

Rye was considered one of the finest of the Cinque Ports, though constant work had to be done to stop the gradual silting up of the river and the harbour. Also, a conflict arose between the maritime interests and the landowners, who gradually "inned" or reclaimed land from the sea on Romney and Walland Marsh, and thus reduced the tidal flows that were supposed to keep the harbour free of silt. Acts of Parliament had to be passed to enable the Rother to be kept navigable at all.

With the coming of bigger ships and larger deepwater ports, Rye's economy began to decline, and fishing and particularly smuggling (including owling, the smuggling of wool) became more important. Imposition of taxes on goods had encouraged smuggling since 1301, but by the end of the 17th century, it became widespread throughout Kent and Sussex, with wool being the largest commodity. When luxury goods were also added, smuggling became a criminal pursuit, and groups – such as the Hawkhurst Gang who met in The Mermaid Inn in Rye – turned to murder and were subsequently hanged. In the 1500s, there was a small Huguenot community at Rye and neighbouring Winchelsea.

Rye Harbour Act 1720
- Act of Parliament
- Parliament of Great Britain
- Long title: An Act for the better Preservation of the Harbour of Rye, in the County of Sussex.
- Citation: 7 Geo. 1. St. 1. c. 9
- Territorial extent: Great Britain

Dates
- Royal assent: 23 March 1721
- Commencement: 8 December 1720 (Note: Start of session.)
- Repealed: 19 July 1797
Other legislation
| Amended by | Rye Harbour Act 1723 |
| Repealed by | Rye Harbour Act 1797 |

Status: Repealed

Text of statute as originally enacted

Rye Harbour Act 1723
- Act of Parliament
- Parliament of Great Britain
- Long title: 10 Geo. 1. c. 7
- Citation: An Act for making more effectual an Act made in the Ninth Year of His Majesty's Reign, intituled, "An Act for compleating the Repairs of the Harbour of Dover, in the County of Kent; and for restoring the Harbour of Rye, in the County of Sussex, to its ancient Goodness," so far as the same relates to the Harbour of Rye.
- Territorial extent: Great Britain

Dates
- Royal assent: 19 March 1724
- Commencement: 9 January 1724
- Repealed: 19 July 1797
Other legislation
| Amends | Dover Harbour Act 1722 |
| Repealed by | Rye Harbour Act 1797 |

Status: Repealed

Text of statute as originally enacted

Rye Harbour Act 1762
- Act of Parliament
- Parliament of Great Britain
- Long title: An Act to empower the Commissioners and Trustees (named and appointed by and in Pursuance of an Act of Parliament, made in the Tenth Year of the Reign of His late Majesty King George the First, for making more effectual an Act made in the Ninth Year of His Majesty's Reign, intituled, "An Act for completing the Repairs of the Harbour of Dover in the County of Kent; and for restoring the Harbour of Rye in the County of Sussex to its ancient Goodness," so far as the same relates to the Harbour of Rye) to let the Sea and Tides into a new Cut, or Channel, made in Pursuance of the said Act of the Tenth Year of His said late Majesty's Reign, as far as a Wall called Winchilsea Wall.
- Citation: 2 Geo. 3. c. 85
- Territorial extent: Great Britain

Dates
- Royal assent: 2 June 1762
- Commencement: 3 November 1761 (Note: Start of session.)
- Repealed: 19 July 1797
Other legislation
| Repealed by | Rye Harbour Act 1797 |

Status: Repealed

Text of statute as originally enacted

Rye Harbour Act 1778
- Act of Parliament
- Parliament of Great Britain
- Long title: An Act for further continuing so much of certain Duties, as have by several Acts of Parliament been granted and continued for repairing and maintaining the Harbours of Dover and Rye, as are applicable to completing and keeping in Repair the said Harbour of Rye, in the County of Sussex.
- Citation: 18 Geo. 3. c. 32
- Territorial extent: Great Britain

Dates
- Royal assent: 10 April 1778
- Commencement: 20 November 1777 (Note: Start of session.)
- Repealed: 19 July 1797
Other legislation
| Repealed by | Rye Harbour Act 1797 |

Status: Repealed

Text of statute as originally enacted

Rye Harbour Act 1797
- Act of Parliament
- Parliament of Great Britain
- Long title: An act for discontinuing the new harbour of Rye, in the county of Sussex, and for repealing several acts relating thereto, and for providing for the discharge of a debt accrued on account thereof; and for making reparations for certain losses; and for the improvement of the old harbour of Rye.
- Citation: 37 Geo. 3. c. 130
- Territorial extent: Great Britain

Dates
- Royal assent: 19 July 1797
- Commencement: 19 July 1797 (Note: Section 1.)
Other legislation
| Repeals/revokes | Rye Harbour Act 1720; Rye Harbour Act 1723; Rye Harbour Act 1762; Rye Harbour Act 1778 |

Status: Current legislation

Text of statute as originally enacted

Rye Harbour Act 1801
- Act of Parliament
- Parliament of the United Kingdom
- Long title: An act for more effectually improving and maintaining the old harbour of Rye in the county of Sussex.
- Citation: 41 Geo. 3. (U.K.) c. liii

Dates
- Royal assent: 20 June 1801

Rye Harbour Act 1830
- Act of Parliament
- Parliament of the United Kingdom
- Long title: An Act to amend an Act passed in the forty-first year of his late Majesty King George the Third, intituled, "An Act for more effectually improving and maintaining the old Harbour of Rye, in the County of Sussex," and to appoint new Commissioners, and to enable the Commissioners to raise additional Funds on the Tolls by way of Mortgage or otherwise.
- Citation: 11 Geo. 4 & 1 Will. 4. c. cxxxv

Dates
- Royal assent: 16 July 1830
Other legislation
| Amends | Rye Harbour Act 1801 |

Text of statute as originally enacted

Rye Harbour Act 1833
- Act of Parliament
- Parliament of the United Kingdom
- Long title: An Act to alter and amend the Powers of several Acts passed relating to the Harbour of Rye in the County of Sussex, and for granting further Powers for improving and completing the said Harbour and the Navigation thereof.
- Citation: 3 & 4 Will. 4. c. lxvii

Dates
- Royal assent: 10 June 1833
Other legislation
| Amends | Rye Harbour Act 1797; Rye Harbour Act 1801; Rye Harbour Act 1830 |

Text of statute as originally enacted

During the 18th century, an attempt was made to construct a 'New Harbour', popularly known as Smeaton's Harbour, to solve the persistent problem of silting of the medieval port. After legislation – in the form of the Rye Harbour Act 1720, Dover Harbour Act 1722, and Rye Harbour Act 1723 – was passed to enable the works, construction started in 1723. John Smeaton, the "father of civil engineering," was brought in as a consultant in 1763 to try to fix existing structural and financial failures The Rye Harbour Commission largely ignored his advice, and his full proposals were never executed. The Rye Harbour Act 1762 and Rye Harbour Act 1778 were passed to continue the work.

After 63 years of intermittent work, the new harbour finally opened for use in June 1787. It was abandoned four months later, in November 1787; it was formally abandoned by the Rye Harbour Act 1797, and focus shifted back to the old harbour. Three further acts of Parliament were passed in the 19th century to discharge the debts of the failed project, and provide for effective management and maintenance of the harbour – the Rye Harbour Act 1801, the Rye Harbour Act 1830 and the Rye Harbour Act 1833. In more recent times, the Harbour of Rye Revision Order 1976 (SI 1976/855) has provided powers for managing the harbour. The Rye Harbour Commissioners were disbanded in 1932, with their responsibilities as harbour authority being taken over Rother and Jury's Gut Catchment Board. The catchment board were succeeded in turn by the Kent River Board in 1948, the Kent River Authority in 1965, the Southern Water Authority in 1974, the National Rivers Authority in 1989, and then the Environment Agency in 1996.

Since 1803, lifeboats have been stationed at Rye although the lifeboat station is now at Rye Harbour about 2 miles (3.2 km) downriver from the town. The worst disaster in RNLI history concerning a single vessel, and in the 20th century, occurred in 1928, when the lifeboat Mary Stanford sank with all hands; 17 men were drowned. The incident is recorded by a tablet at Winchelsea church, by the imposing memorial at Rye Harbour Church and by the folk song "The Mary Stanford of Rye". A new Mary Stanford was commissioned by the RNLI two years later, and stationed at Ballycotton on the coast of Ireland. Since 2010, the RNLI has operated an Atlantic 85-class inshore lifeboat at Rye Harbour.

Between 1696 and 1948, six ships of the Royal Navy have borne the name HMS Rye.

During the 1803–1805 Napoleonic invasion threat, Rye, Dover, and Chatham were regarded as the three most likely invasion ports, and Rye became the western command centre for the Royal Military Canal. The canal was planned from Pett Level to Hythe, but was not completed until long after the threat had passed.

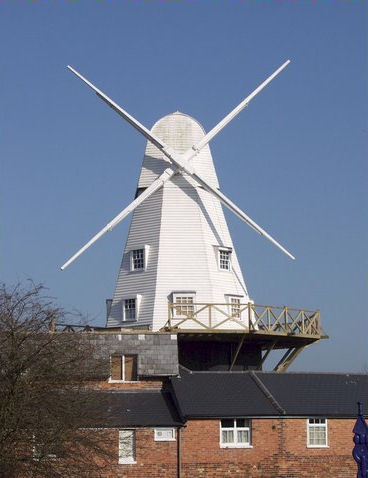
The windmill

From 1838 to 1889, Rye had its own borough police force. It was a small force, often with just two officers. Rye police frequently had difficulties on Bonfire night (5 November) and special constables were recruited to help deal with the problems bonfire gangs caused. After amalgamation with the county force in 1889 a new police station was provided in Church Square. (Note: This station closed in 1967 with the opening of a new station in Cinque Port Street.) In 1892 the strength of the town police, now amalgamated, was one sergeant and three constables.

In May 1940, during the darkest days of World War II, the Rye fishing fleet was invited to participate in Operation Dynamo, the seaborne rescue of the stranded British Expeditionary Force at Dunkirk, but according to one source, refused to do so. However, it appears that at least 7 fishing vessels registered at Rye are listed as taking part in the Dunkirk evacuations.

== Rye Royal ==
Rye, being part of the Cinque Ports Confederation and a bastion against invasion on the Channel Coast, has always had close links with the crown. King Edward III and the Black Prince defeated the Spanish in Rye Bay in 1350 in the battle of Les Espagnols sur Mer, but Queen Elizabeth I gave the town the right to use the title "Rye Royal" following a visit in 1573. King Charles I described Rye as "The cheapest sea-towne for the provision of fish for our house". Whilst returning from visiting his continental possessions in 1726, George I was grounded on Camber Sands and spent the next four days in Rye, being accommodated at Lamb House.

== Governance ==
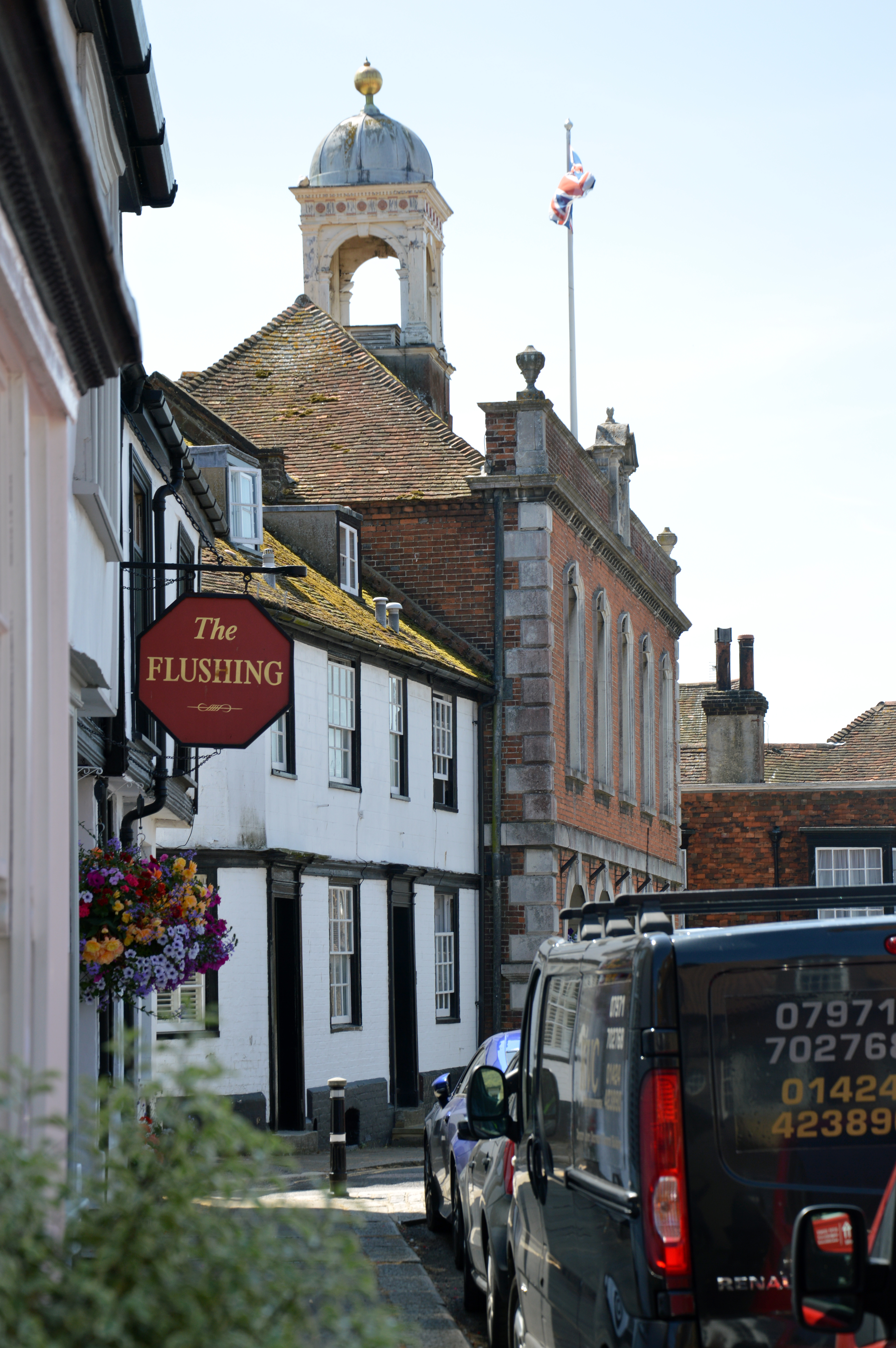
Market Street and Rye Town Hall

Historically, Rye was an independent borough granted rights of governance under its charter of 1289, with its own appointed Mayor of Rye and chosen jurats (magistrates). These independent powers were terminated by the Local Government Act 1972 and, although officially considered to be a rural parish, Rye's governing body – because of its history – is that of a Town Council. That Council has one electoral ward, electing 16 members, one of whom then is elected mayor of Rye. In Rye Town Hall, the list of the mayors of Rye is unbroken going back to the 13th century. Two gruesome relics of Rye's violent past include the gibbet cage which was famously used to display the hanged body of the murderer John Breads in 1742, and the pillory last used in 1813 in the case of a local publican who assisted the escape of the French General Armand Philippon.

Apart from the Town Council, the majority of local government functions are exercised by Rother District Council, with its headquarters in Bexhill-on-Sea, and East Sussex County Council, based in Lewes. The Rother District Council ward of Rye and Winchelsea returns two councillors. The East Sussex County Council division of Rye and Eastern Rother returns one councillor.

Since 1983, Rye has been part of the parliamentary constituency of Hastings and Rye, prior to which it had its own seat. The current Member of Parliament, since 2024, is Helena Dollimore of the Labour Party.

== Geography ==
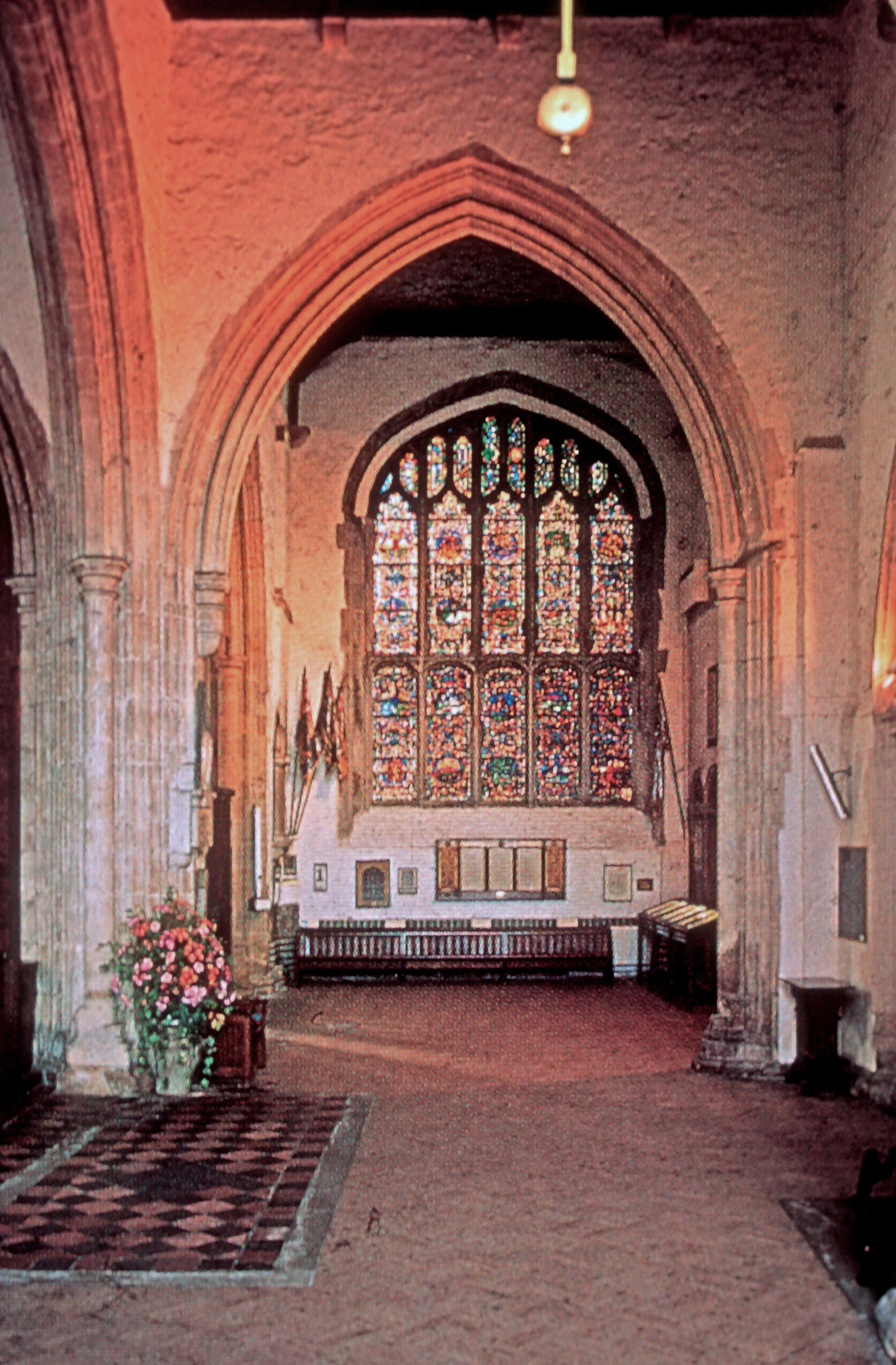
Interior of St Mary's Church

Rye stands at the point where the sandstone high land of the Weald reaches the coast. The medieval coastline (see map above), with its large bay, enabled ships to come up to the port. The original course of the River Rother then reached the sea at Romney to the northeast. Storms in the English Channel in the 13th century, coupled with reclamation of the bay, brought huge quantities of gravel through longshore drift along the coast, blocking the port entrance. The course of the river has also changed over the centuries so that Rye now stands on the river at the point of its confluence with the River Tillingham and the River Brede, whereas the river flows southward into Rye Bay. River Rother and the environs of Rye Harbour are managed and maintained by the Environment Agency. The Rivers Brede and Rother also form part of the Royal Military Canal between Winchelsea and Iden Lock. The town is part of the remotest and least populated area of southeastern England, on the edge of Romney Marsh and within 3 km of the coast.

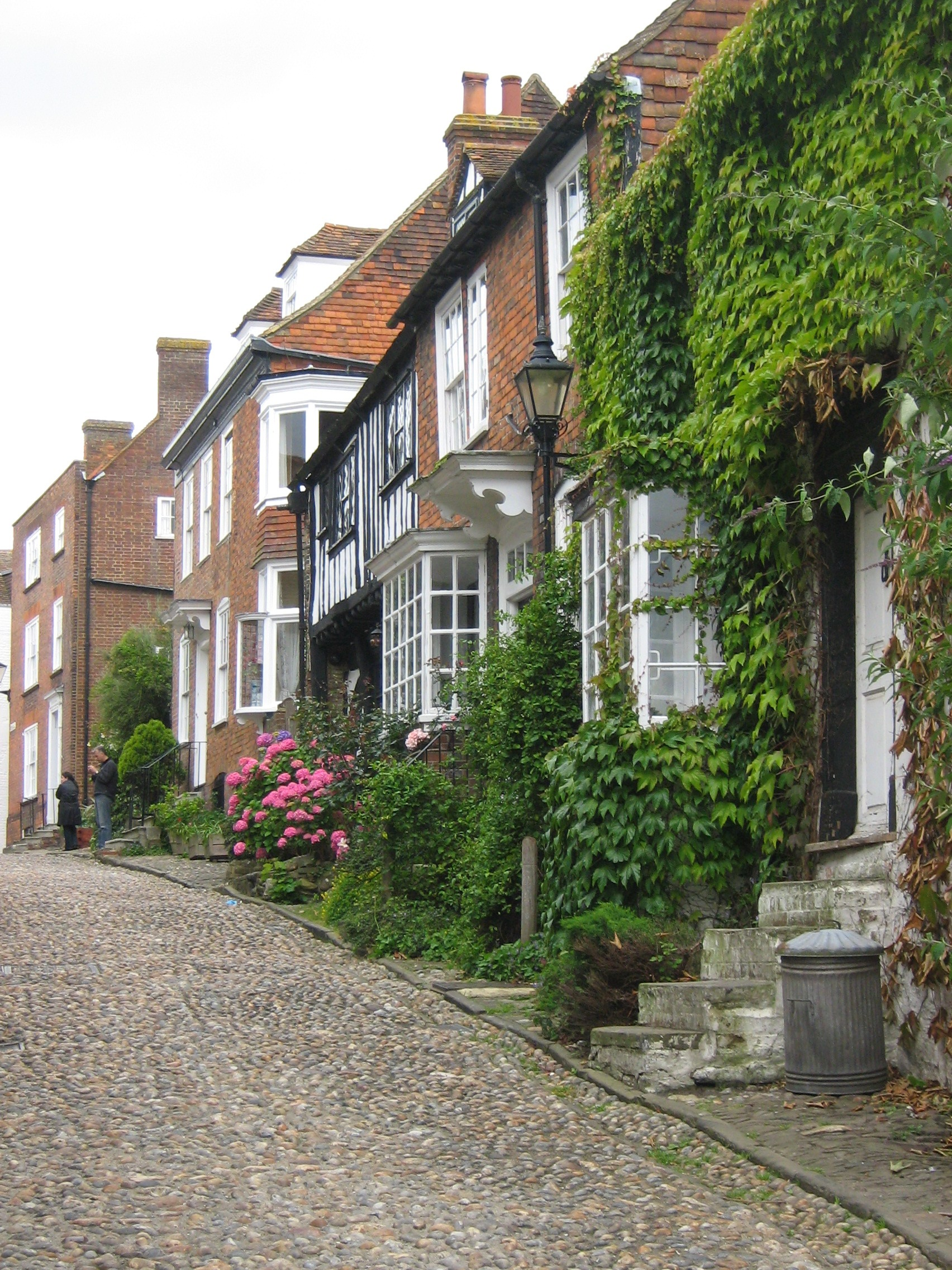
Mermaid Street, showing typically steep slope and cobbled surface

A part of the town, but only a minority of the housing stock, lies on the original rocky heights (the Citadel) and contains the historic buildings including St Mary's parish church, the Ypres Tower (part of the Town Wall), Lamb House and many of the houses on Mermaid Street, Watchbell Street, and Church Square. The main road skirts the town to the south after crossing the river; Winchelsea Road leads to New Winchelsea Road, formerly Royal Military Road, which runs parallel to the River Brede before leaving the town boundary. The houses along New Winchelsea Road date from the 1930s, built on the excavations from the Royal Military Canal. The gardens run down to the river, with fishing and boating rights. Most of Rye's inhabitants live outside the Citadel area.

== Economy ==
Rye, over the centuries, has successively been an entrepôt port, a naval base, a fishing port, an agricultural centre, and a market town. The old part of the town within the former town walls has shops, art galleries and restaurants. Additionally, Rye is known for oast houses in the surrounding villages and hamlets Many have been converted into private residences, however a few, like the Playden Oasts Inn, remain open to the public.

The great attractiveness of the town has kept it on the tourist trail, especially its "perfect cobbled lanes, like Mermaid Street, which must be one of Britain's most photographed". A 2020 report praised the medieval streets "often wonky houses and it is easy to get lost in the town's history". Camber Sands beach, "with its moody sand dunes and long sandy beach", is nearby. The town and its surrounding areas were branded "1066 country" because of the historic aspects. Few statistics are published for Rye as a town, but an estimated one million visits were made in 2016.

Since the Second World War, the town has become a centre for ceramics. The COVID-19 pandemic negatively affected many East Sussex businesses in 2020–2021. East Sussex Council estimated in September 2020 that "more than £45 million" was expected to be "injected into the county’s economy to aid recovery from the impact of Covid-19".

Apart from its tourist base, Rye continues to operate as a port. At Rye Harbour, the Rastrums Wharf (which was renovated in the 1980s) has the capacity to take large ships up to 80 metres (260 ft) on a high tide.

Considerable investment has been made in facilities for both the fishing fleet berthed at Rye and the commercial wharves at Rye Harbour. Rye fishing boats are code-lettered RX (from "Rye, Sussex"; this registration is also used by the Hastings fishing fleet) and land fish daily. Some of the catch is sold at the quayside, though most is sold through the great regional market in Boulogne.

Rye also is an important yachting base, offering the only safe haven for many miles in either direction along this section of Channel coast. Yachts may currently moor either at Rye Harbour or at the Strand Quay at the edge of the town. Numerous plans have been proposed for a modern yacht marina to be built at Rye, but each has foundered on economic or planning grounds.

== Transport ==
At the latter end of the 18th century, Rye was connected to the turnpike trust system of roads. One of these, the Flimwell Turnpike, took passengers towards London; the second ran from Hastings eastwards through the town. These two roads are now the A268 and the A259. The Monk Bretton Bridge over the Rother was built in 1893 and provided a link with Rye and New Romney via Brenzett. In the 1980s and 1990s, proposals to bypass the A259 route around Rye were met with local opposition and never received any priority in the building programme.

In addition to the half-hourly 100/101 Dover-Hastings Stagecoach long-distance bus service, buses connect Rye with other towns and villages, including Tenterden, Hastings, and Tunbridge Wells.

Rye railway station is on the Marshlink line between Hastings and Ashford. This now provides an hourly service from Eastbourne to Ashford International connecting with the high-speed Class 395 service to London St Pancras. Gatwick Airport may be reached by rail via Eastbourne or Lewes.

Before World War II, a summer steamship service ran from Rye to Boulogne. Rye was also the terminus for the prewar Rye & Camber Tramway, built to serve golf courses and Camber Sands; it was closed to the public at the outbreak of World War II, never reopened, and scrapped in 1947.

Several long-distance footpaths can be joined by walkers in the town. The Saxon Shore Way which starts at Gravesend, Kent, and traces the coast as it was in Roman times, passes through Rye en route to Hastings; the 1066 Country Walk leads from Rye to Pevensey; the High Weald Landscape Trail goes to Horsham; and the Royal Military Canal Path follows that waterway to Hythe.

== Education ==
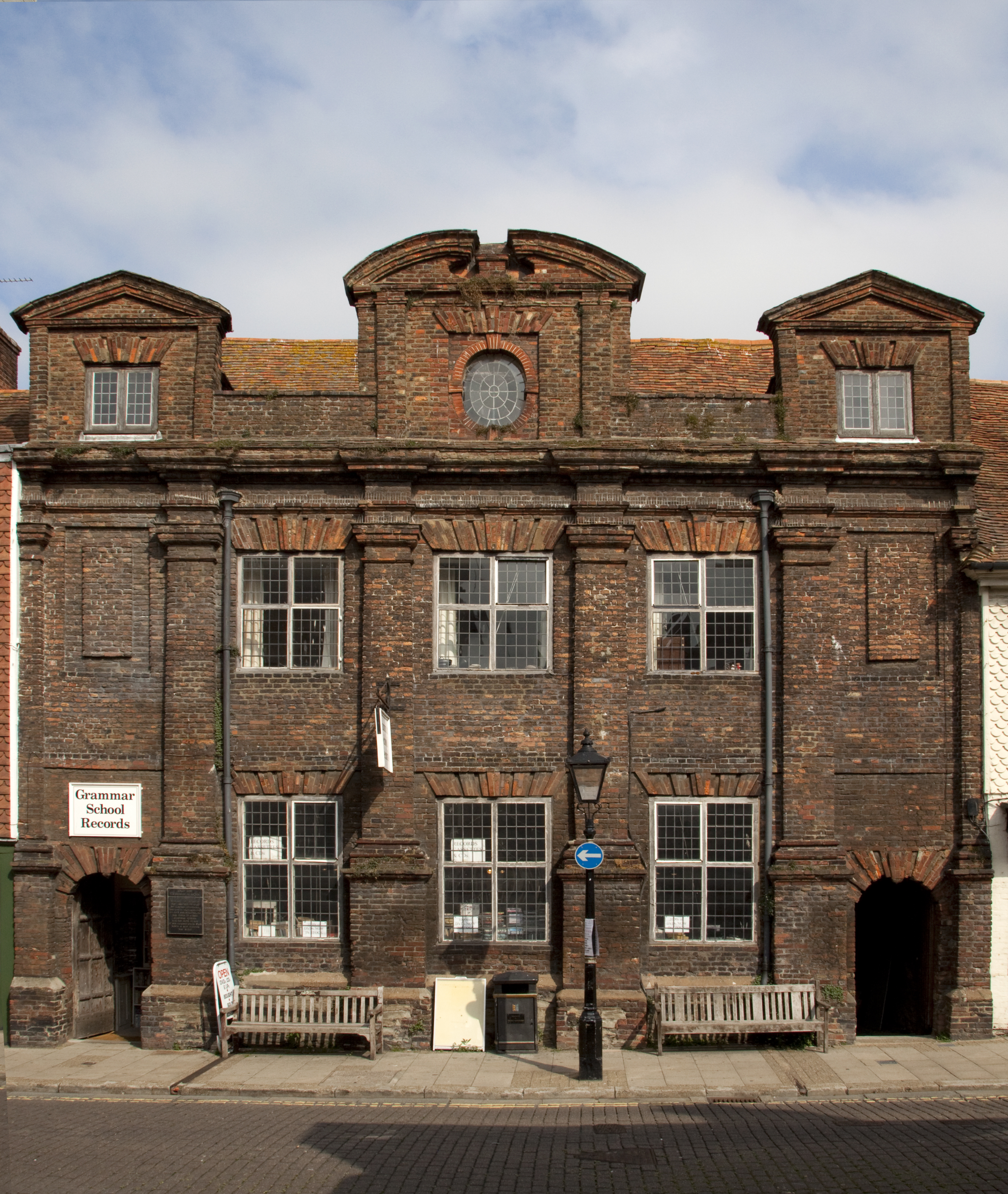
The Old Rye Grammar School (Thomas Peacocke School)

Rye College (formerly called Thomas Peacocke Community College, and before that Thomas Peacocke School) is a secondary school in Rye. The two primary schools, Tilling Green Infant School and Freda Gardham Community School, were replaced by a new school, Rye Primary, adjacent to the secondary institution, in September 2008. The original Rye Primary School was situated just off Ferry Road near the railway crossing.

== Places of worship ==
Past and present places of worship in Rye include St Mary's, the Anglican parish church with Norman origins; St Anthony of Padua Roman Catholic church, rebuilt in 1929; a 1909 Baptist chapel in Cinque Ports Street, replacing the Rye Particular Baptist Chapel of 1754 (which itself stood on the site of an older Quaker meeting house); former Congregational and Independent churches; and a Methodist chapel.

== Amenities ==
Rye is a local commercial centre for the Romney Marsh and Walland Marsh areas, as well as being a tourist spot. Rye Farmers' Market takes place on Strand Quay every Thursday morning. Rye has a well-established reputation as a centre for shops trading antiques, collectors' books, and records, and has many art galleries selling works by local artists and potters with changing exhibitions throughout the year.

Rye's general weekly market takes place on the marketplace car park by the station every Thursday. Until the foot-and-mouth disease crisis in 2001 (which closed all livestock markets in England), livestock sales were held frequently at Rye.

Rye Castle Museum is located on two sites, on East Street and at the Ypres Castle. One of the tourist websites includes a picture tour of the town Rye Art Gallery was established as a Trust in the early 1960s. Located at 107 High Street and incorporating the former Ypres Studio in Ockmans Lane, home of artists Mary Stormont (1871–1962) and her husband Howard Gull Stormont (1859–1935), it provides a focus for contemporary visual art, which it exhibits alongside heritage artworks from its permanent collection.

Rye also stands at the centre of a network of nature reserves, some of national importance. The Rye Harbour SSSI lies to the south and includes the Rye Harbour Nature Reserve. The neighbouring Pett Levels and Pools, and the Pannel Valley nature reserve are accessible via Winchelsea and Winchelsea Beach a few miles to the west, whilst Scotney Lake lies just off the Lydd road and the RSPB reserve at Dungeness lies a few miles further to the east with the Bird Observatory located in the old lighthouse.

The recent redevelopment of the Rye wharf for the RX fishing fleet has provided modern amenities for the landing and storage of fish. Most is sold wholesale through the regional market in Boulogne, though there is a trend for Rye to develop as a gastronomic centre in the style of Newquay or Padstow, featuring the use of fresh local produce from the sea. The annual "Rye Bay Scallop Festival" which takes place each year in February was first proposed by the then Chair of the Chamber of Commerce, Kate Roy, as a means of promoting the "Rye Bay Catch".

Every year in September, Rye hosts its annual two-week Arts Festival which attracts a world-class series of performers in music, comedy, and literature.

On the second Saturday after 5 November, the "Bonfire Boys" stage the annual Rye Bonfire featuring a torch-lit parade through the streets of the town, supported by visiting Bonfire Societies from all over the Sussex Bonfire Societies Confederation. This is followed by a "gurt 'normous bonfire" where the chosen "effigy" of the year is ceremoniously blown up, and a spectacular firework display. This event typically attracts over 10,000 visitors to the town, and results in the town's roads, and the main roads to London, Hastings, and Ashford, being clogged up and closed to traffic from the early evening onwards.

== Local media ==
Local news and television programmes are provided by BBC South East and ITV Meridian. Television signals are received from the Dover and the local relay transmitters.

Rye’s local radio stations are BBC Radio Sussex on 104.5 FM, Heart South on 102 FM and a community radio station which launched on FM on 7 March 2022 and is called Cinque Ports Radio on 95.1FM. This station broadcasts across Romney Marsh and Hythe on 100.2FM and on 95.1FM across Rye, Winchelsea and surrounding areas. Cinque Ports Radio replaced Shoreline FM 100.2 which broadcast since January 2020. Shoreline FM now being an online only service for Rye, Romney Marsh and Hythe called Shoreline Easy.

The town’s local newspaper is Rye News.

== Sports ==
Rye has a non-League football club, Rye Town FC, who play their home matches at The Salts. The club, which was formed in 2016, plays in the East Sussex Football League, and replaced the now defunct Rye United FC (formerly Rye & Iden United) of the Sussex County Football League, which folded in 2014. Rye has a rugby union club, Rye RFC, who compete in the Sussex 2 league. The club was formed in 1991 and field both adult and youth teams. The rugby club and its playing fields are located on New Road.

== Rye in literature and film ==
Several mentions of the "small English seaport" were made by travel writers between the 16th and 18th centuries. Among them, Daniel Defoe described the state of the harbour and its approaches, believing that "Rye would flourish again, if her harbour, which was once able to receive the royal navy, cou'd be restor'd", but thought it very doubtful that large ships would be able to use the port again.

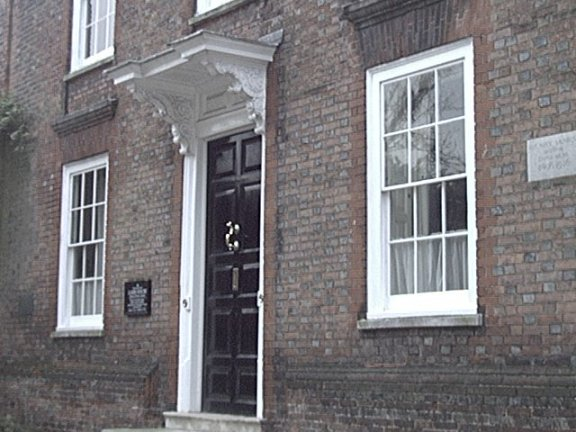
Lamb House

Rye has also produced and attracted many writers, some of whom lived at Lamb House which is one of the town's most notable historic residences and now owned by the National Trust. Residents have included Henry James, who lived there between 1898 and 1916, and E. F. Benson. Others who lived in the area include Joseph Conrad; Ford Madox Ford; Stephen Crane; Rumer Godden and the naturalist W. H. Hudson. H. G. Wells, Lytton Strachey and Virginia Woolf were also visitors to Rye.

Lamb House and the town of Rye feature prominently in Benson's Mapp and Lucia novels, as Mallards House and Tilling, respectively. In the mid-1980s, Rye was used as a location by LWT in its adaptation of the novels. Later a BBC adaptation of Mapp and Lucia was filmed in Rye in the summer of 2014. And in May 1958 the author Georgette Heyer spent some time in the town, researching background for several scenes for what became her novel The Unknown Ajax, set in 1817.

== The artistic connection ==
The town and its striking surroundings have frequently served as subject for painters, many of whose works are now on display in its art gallery. One of the earliest topographical panoramas, dating from the 17th century when the town was still an island port, is in the style of Hendrick Danckerts and on display in Rye Castle Museum. Later landscapists who recorded views of the town have included Thomas Girtin, William Daniell, and J. M. W. Turner. During the 20th century, the harbour and its marshy surroundings were a particular draw for such artists as Paul Nash, Eric Ravilious and John Piper. In addition, Edward Burra lived near Rye and frequently painted its marshy surroundings, buildings in the town and even local characters. Burra's lifelong friend, pioneer ballet dancer, theatre director and designer William Chappell was a long-term resident living on Rope Walk.

== Twin towns ==
Rye is twinned with Rye, New Hampshire, United States.

== Notable people ==
Other residents of the town and environs have included:

- Conrad Aiken (1889–1973), American writer: Aiken's former home, Jeake's House, is now a guest house.
- Joan Aiken (1924–2004), children's author, daughter of Conrad Aiken
- Geoffrey Bagley (1901–1992), Canadian war artist who settled in Rye post war and then worked to preserve the town's historic mementos and places.
- John Banting (1902–1972), artist and writer, moved to Rye in the 1950s. He lived at 10 High Street.
- Viola Bayley (1911–1997), children's writer of adventure stories.
- Reginald Blomfield (1856–1942), prolific architect and designer of the Cross of Sacrifice
- Fred Boreham (1885–1951), professional footballer
- Edward Burra (1905–1976), painter, draughtsman and printmaker, born near Rye and lived in the town from time to time in the 1920s and 1930s
- John Christopher (1922–2012), science fiction author. The 1980s British television series based on his trilogy, The Tripods, was filmed near his house.
- Tom Chaplin (born 1979), singer of the band Keane
- Frederick Cuming (artist) (1930–2022) Royal Academician specialising in Landscapes and Seascapes of the Sussex Coast.
- Monica Edwards (1912–1998), children's author who lived at Rye Harbour and set her Romney Marsh novels in the area, renaming Rye Dunsford.
- Horace Field (1861–1948), influential "Wrenaissance" architect
- John Fletcher (1579–1625), Jacobean playwright and solicitor
- Babylon Graundfote (c. 1420 – 1480), English politician who sat in the House of Commons at several points between 1459 and 1465, and also served as Mayor of Rye between 1463 and 1475.
- Radclyffe Hall (1880–1943), ground-breaking lesbian writer
- John Howlett, writer (1942–2019) of novels, TV series, the script of the film If.... and other works.
- Henry James, (1843–1916), American author
- Wendy Law-Yone (born 1947), Burmese writer who current lives in London and Rye
- Paul Nash (1889–1946), World War I artist, lived in East Street in the 1930s
- Simon Nelson, 10th Earl Nelson (born 1971)
- Paul McCartney (born 1942), Beatle, has a home near Peasmarsh.
- Spike Milligan (1918–2002), comedian, writer, musician, poet, playwright and vice-president of the Rye Rugby Club
- Prince Rostislav Romanov (born 1985), painter and member of the Russian Romanov family, grew up in Rye
- John Ryan (1921–2009), although born in Edinburgh, this British author/cartoonist famed for his TV cartoon Captain Pugwash, was a resident of Rye.
- Malcolm Saville (1901–1982), author of nearly 80 children's books, largely thrillers and adventure stories. Saville was the creator of the Lone Pine series of books, a number of which were set in Rye, including The Gay Dolphin Adventure and Rye Royal.
- Baron Saville of Newdigate (born 1936) chair of the "Bloody Sunday" enquiry and nephew of Malcolm Saville, attended Rye Grammar School (1947–1953). The new Rye Studio School's dance theatre is named after him.
- Admiral Sir Aubrey Smith (1872–1957) lived in Rye at Iden Cottage.
- Russell Thorndike (1885–1972) set his Dr Syn novels about smuggling on the marshes.
- Philippa Urquhart (born 1940), British actress
- Sir Anthony van Dyck (1599–1641) did several drawings of the town.
- J. M. W. Turner (1775–1851) did many drawings and paintings of the town and its coastline, including surrounding areas such as Hastings.

== See also ==
- Listed buildings in Rye, East Sussex
