= Rose Fuller =

Rose Fuller FRS (12 April 1708 – 7 May 1777) was a West Indies plantation owner and politician who sat in the House of Commons from 1756 to 1777.

== Early life ==
Fuller was the second son of John Fuller FRS, of Brightling, Sussex, and his wife Elizabeth Rose, daughter of Fulke Rose of Jamaica. His elder brother was the MP John Fuller Jr. He studied medicine at Cambridge University and was also a student at Leyden in the Netherlands. He graduated MD and became a Fellow of the Royal Society in 1732.

Fuller went to Jamaica before 1735, where he took over the family plantation from his father. He was elected to the Assembly in 1735 and called to the council in 1737. He was made a judge of the supreme courts but as a result of disputes with the governor Edward Trelawny he was removed from the council and the bench and returned to England in 1749. He was back in Jamaica in around 1752 and was appointed Chief Justice by the next governor Charles Knowles. However he was in dispute with Knowles and returned to England on the death of his brother there, whose estate, including Rose Hill (now known as Brightling Park), he inherited.

== Political career ==
Fuller was a Member of Parliament for New Romney from 1756 to 1761, for Maidstone from 1761 to 1768, and for Rye from 1768 to 1777.

== Family ==
On 26 April 1737 Fuller married Ithamar Mill, daughter of Richard Mill of Jamaica. She died in Jamaica on 22 April 1738 at the age of seventeen. He died childless on 7 May 1777, and was buried at Waldron, Sussex, on 15 May 1777. His Sussex estate and foundry and Jamaican plantation passed to his nephew Mad Jack Fuller of Brightling, Sussex.

Parliament of Great Britain
Preceded by Gabriel Hanger; Savile Finch	Member of Parliament for Maidstone; 1761–1768; With: William Northey	Succeeded by Hon. Charles Marsham; Robert Gregory
Preceded by John Bentinck; John Norris	Member of Parliament for Rye; 1768–1777; With: John Norris 1768–1774; Middleton Onslow 1774–1775; Hon. Thomas Onslow 1775–1777	Succeeded by Hon. Thomas Onslow; William Dickinson
Preceded by Henry Furnese; Sir Francis Dashwood, Bt	Member of Parliament for New Romney; 1756–1761; With: Sir Francis Dashwood, Bt	Succeeded by Sir Edward Dering, Bt; Thomas Knight
