= Geoffrey Bagley =

English historian

Geoffrey Bagley

Geoffrey Spink Bagley (3 November 1901 – 1992) was an English artist, museum curator, politician, historian and writer.

In 1942 the Wartime Information Board and the National Film Board of Canada hired Bagley as a graphic artist. He created wartime propaganda and recruitment posters for the Royal Navy.

== Selected works ==
- The Ancient Town of Rye (1958)
- Some Inns & Ale-houses of Rye, 1650-1950 (1958)
- William Holloway, Historian of Rye: a Study of His Life and Times, 1785-1870 (1963)
- Old inns & Ale-houses of Rye (1965)
- The Ancient Town of Tye (1969)
- Edwardian Rye from Contemporary Photographs (1974)
- The Story of the Ypres Tower and the Rye Museum (1975)
- A Connoisseurs Guide to Rye (1979)
- The Book of Rye: an Ancient Town of the Cinque Ports Confederation (1982)
- A Picture Guide to Romney Marsh and Adjoining Levels (1986)
