= Brightling Park =

Country estate in East Sussex, England

Coordinates: 50.9632°N 0.3958°W

Brightling Park (previously known as Rose Hill) is a country estate which lies in the parishes of Brightling and Dallington in the Rother district of East Sussex, England. It is now the home of Grissell Racing, who have operated a racehorse training facility there for more than 30 years.

The 18th-century house is brick-built in two storeys with a nine window north front and stands in some 200ha (490 acres) of parkland. Additional wings added in 1810 were demolished in 1955. 18th-century grade II listed stables and a coach-house to the south-east of the house comprise a single long building. The house is approached by an avenue bounded by ha-has, to the side of which stands a grade II listed alcove or summerhouse. The parkland is Grade II listed whereas Brightling Park House itself is a Grade II* listed building.

Associated with the estate are a number of follies and an observatory, all designed by architect Sir Robert Smirke for John "Mad Jack" Fuller in the early 1800s.

The Obelisk aka Brightling Needle

The Observatory

The Alcove or Summerhouse stands to the west of the house within the park and is a semicircular alcove built of red brick with a four-centred archway entrance flanked by pairs of interlocking columns. Built in 1803, it is a Grade II listed building.

The Temple, standing within the park 400m to the south-west of the house, is a small circular building consisting of a colonnade surmounted by a dome. It is a Grade II* listed building.

The Obelisk, also known as Brightling Needle, stands some 500m outside the park's perimeter wall on top of Brightling Down and is a Grade II* listed building.

The Observatory was built in 1818 on a high spot outside the park some 150m to the west. It is a T-shaped one storey building built of ashlar with slits for the telescopes. Now a private house, it is also a Grade II* listed building.

== History ==
The first known house on the site, 'Sheperdes', was built between 1540 and 1561 by Michael Martin, who sold the estate in 1582 to Thomas Isted. It then passed in 1608 to John Baker and in 1652 to Edward English, who enlarged the estate before selling it in 1684 to William Peake. After Peake's death in 1685 his sister sold it in 1697 to Thomas Fuller (d.1720), a local industrialist.

The Fuller family fortune was based on the manufacture of iron goods, especially cannons and the like for the Royal Navy, plus a substantial income from sugar produced on their Jamaican slave plantations. Thomas Fuller extended the estate to 95ha (230 acres) and rebuilt the house around 1699. It passed in 1703 to his nephew John Fuller (1680–1745) who married Elizabeth Rose, a Jamaican heiress. Fuller renamed the house Rose Hill in her honour and added an additional 59ha (145 acres) to the estate.

His son, John Fuller II (c 1705–1755), spent heavily on the estate between 1745 and 1755, rebuilding the house and adding the west and the office wings. He also further extended the estate by purchasing another 372ha (920 acres) and created a deer park around the new house. He also planted clumps of trees and built a Chinese Temple and a keep in the grounds.

After John Fuller II's death the estate descended via his brother Rose Fuller to Rose's nephew John, known as "Honest Jack" or "Mad Jack" Fuller. An MP, philanthropist and eccentric, John Fuller commissioned architect Sir Robert Smirke to extend the house around 1800 and to build a number of follies on the estate. A wall was also built, at a cost of some £10,000, right round the park, which had grown to 1530ha (3780 acres).

After John Fuller's death in 1834 the estate passed to his cousin Augustus Fuller who sold it to Percy Tew, who changed its name back to Brightling Park in 1879. It descended in the Tew family until 1953, when it passed to Tew's daughter-in-law, Rosemary Grissell. Death duties caused part of the estate to be sold and partial demolition of the house in 1955. The remaining parkland, of some 200ha (490 acres) is still privately owned and operated as a racehorse training facility.

The Brightling International Horse Trials are held there annually.
