= The Mermaid Inn, Rye =

Inn in Rye, East Sussex, England

The Mermaid Inn
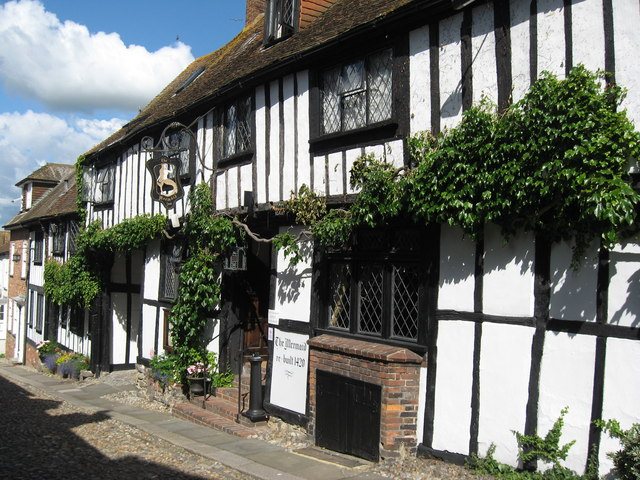

- Location within East Sussex
- Alternative names: Mermaid Hotel

General information
- Location: East Sussex, England
- Coordinates: 50°57′0″N 0°43′53″E
- Completed: 1156; 1420

Technical details
- Structural system: Timber framing

The Mermaid Inn is a Grade II* listed historical inn located on Mermaid Street in the ancient town of Rye, East Sussex, southeastern England. One of the best-known inns in southeast England, it was established in the 12th century and has a long, turbulent history. The current building dates from 1420 and has 16th-century additions in the Tudor style, and cellars built in 1156 survive.

== Geography ==
The Mermaid Inn is located on Mermaid Street, which was once the town's main road. Mermaid street of present day, must have been the Middle street of 1670. Middle Street used to include the present Mermaid and Middle streets; the original Middle street was the present Mermaid street, as the Mermaid Inn is described, by William Holloway writing in the 19th century, as abutting on the south towards that street. The inn is situated on the north side of Mermaid street, and abutted to Middle Street towards the south.

== History ==
=== Early years ===
The cellars of the Mermaid Inn date from 1156, believed to be the year that the original inn was built, or shortly afterwards: Nikolaus Pevsner and English Heritage identified them as 13th-century. The building was originally constructed of wattle and daub

In the 1420s, the inn was rebuilt, retaining its cellars. It underwent further renovation in the 16th century. Queen Elizabeth I was a guest at the inn.

The Hawkhurst Gang used the premises during the 1730s and 1740s. This large group of smugglers controlled territory from Kent to Dorset from their base at the Oak and Ivy Inn in Hawkhurst, and used the Mermaid Inn as a secondary location. There are secret tunnels. including one which ran from the cellars to the Old Bell Inn (built 1390) in The Mint, a street which runs parallel to the north of Mermaid Street. A revolving cupboard at the end of the tunnel in the Olde Bell would then be used by the gang as an escape exit

By 1770, the building ceased functioning as an inn. By 1847, it was in use as a house and was owned by Charles Poile; the yard at the back, through which there was a footway leading to High Street, was called the Mermaid Yard.

=== Later years ===
The inn functioned as a club in 1913, when it was owned by May Aldington, mother of the novelist Richard Aldington. In 1945, during World War II, the inn functioned as a garrison for Canadian officers. It was later purchased by L. Wilson, a Canadian who had been garrisoned there.

Under the name Mermaid House and The Mermaid Hotel, the Mermaid Inn was listed at Grade II* by English Heritage on 12 October 1951. This defines it as a "particularly important" building of "more than special interest". As of February 2001, it was one of 75 Grade II* listed buildings, and 2,106 listed buildings of all grades, in Rother—the local government district in which Rye is located. The Mermaid Inn was bought by Judith Blincow and Robert Pinwill in 1993.

== Architecture and fittings ==
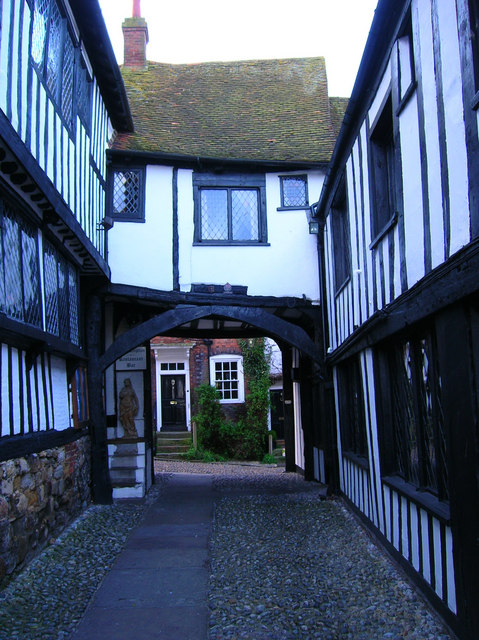
Passage leading from the courtyard

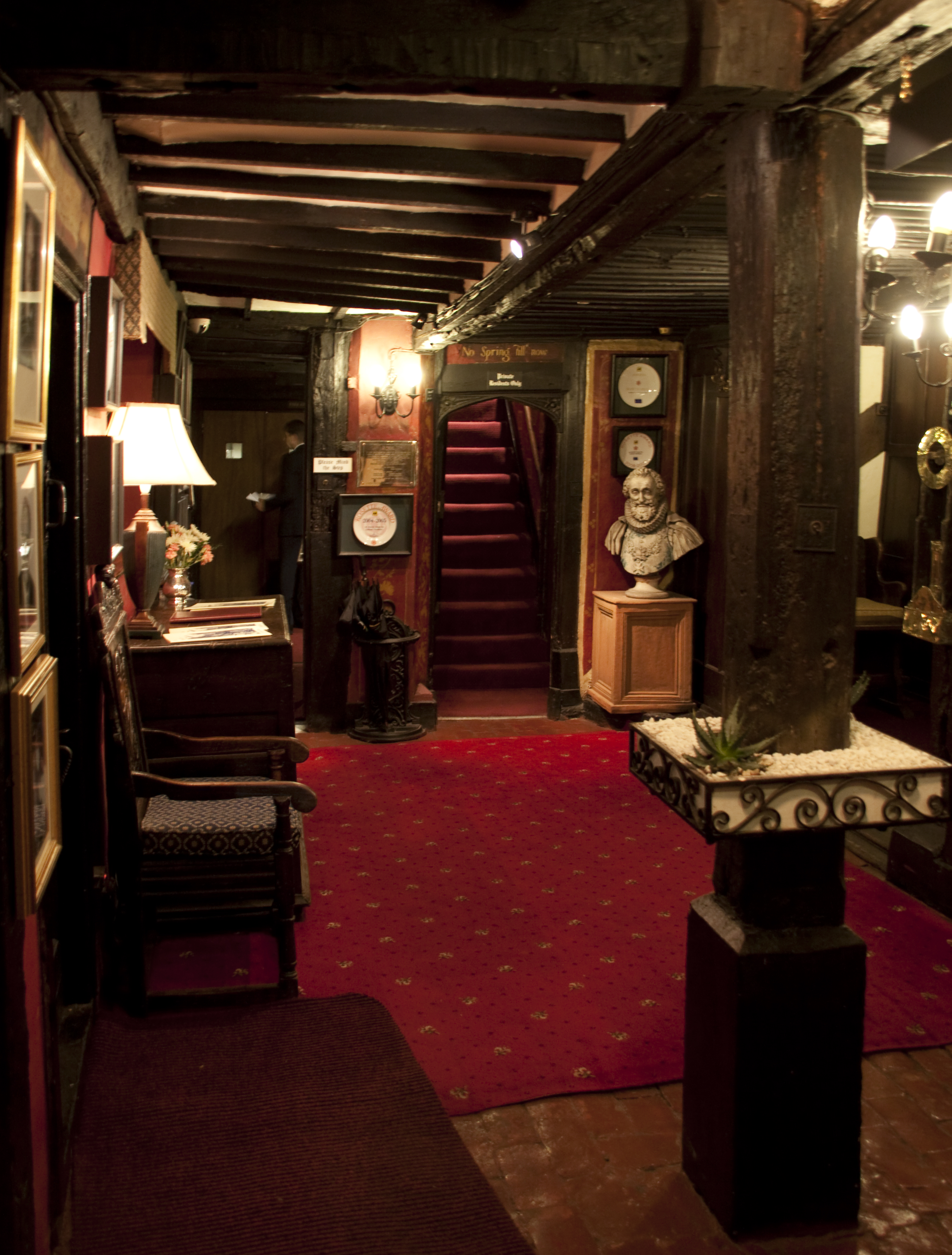
Entrance hall

The black and white timber-framed and tiled building, with dark oak and carved stone chimney pieces, was constructed in the mid-15th century; the author of Old Sussex Inns identifies 1426 as the date. Some of the timber was taken from ships that had been broken up. The south-facing elevation, the oldest section apart from the cellars, has a five-window range to the upper storey and attic space above. The upper storey is jettied, and the section to the west extends over the entrance to the inner courtyard and former stable area. This overhang is supported on wooden columns with brackets and cross-beams. The north-facing section, beyond courtyard, is also timber-framed but with brick facing and infilling. It rises to two storeys with two windows on each and a dormer above. This, and the east and west ranges, are 16th- and 18th-century. The tiled roof has one gable end.

The chimney is made of Caen stone and embellished with decorations. The secret passages that existed in the inn have now been converted into fireplaces. The Giant's Fireplace Bar features an inglenook fireplace which is supported by a beam that traverses the room. Other low panelled rooms, contain large Tudor fireplaces and dog grates (a freestanding basket grate intended to hold wood for the fireplace). Monogram, names and dates are carved on the stone fireplaces, including "1643", "1646", and "Loffelholtz". Some of the chairs are elaborately carved and were made from ships' timbers.

There are 31 rooms, each of different design, spread over several floors. Eight bedrooms have 4-poster beds. The bathrooms are fitted with modern amenities. The ceiling has thick and dark teak wood beams while the windows are made of lead frames. Diamond-paned windows are situated at the back.

== Claims of haunting ==
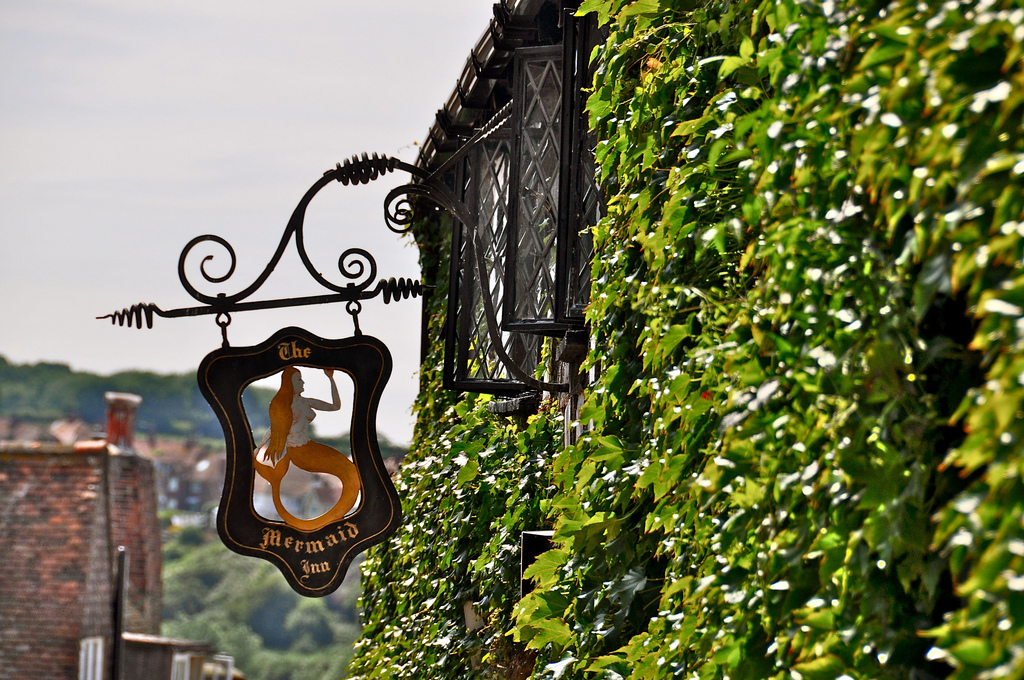
The pub sign

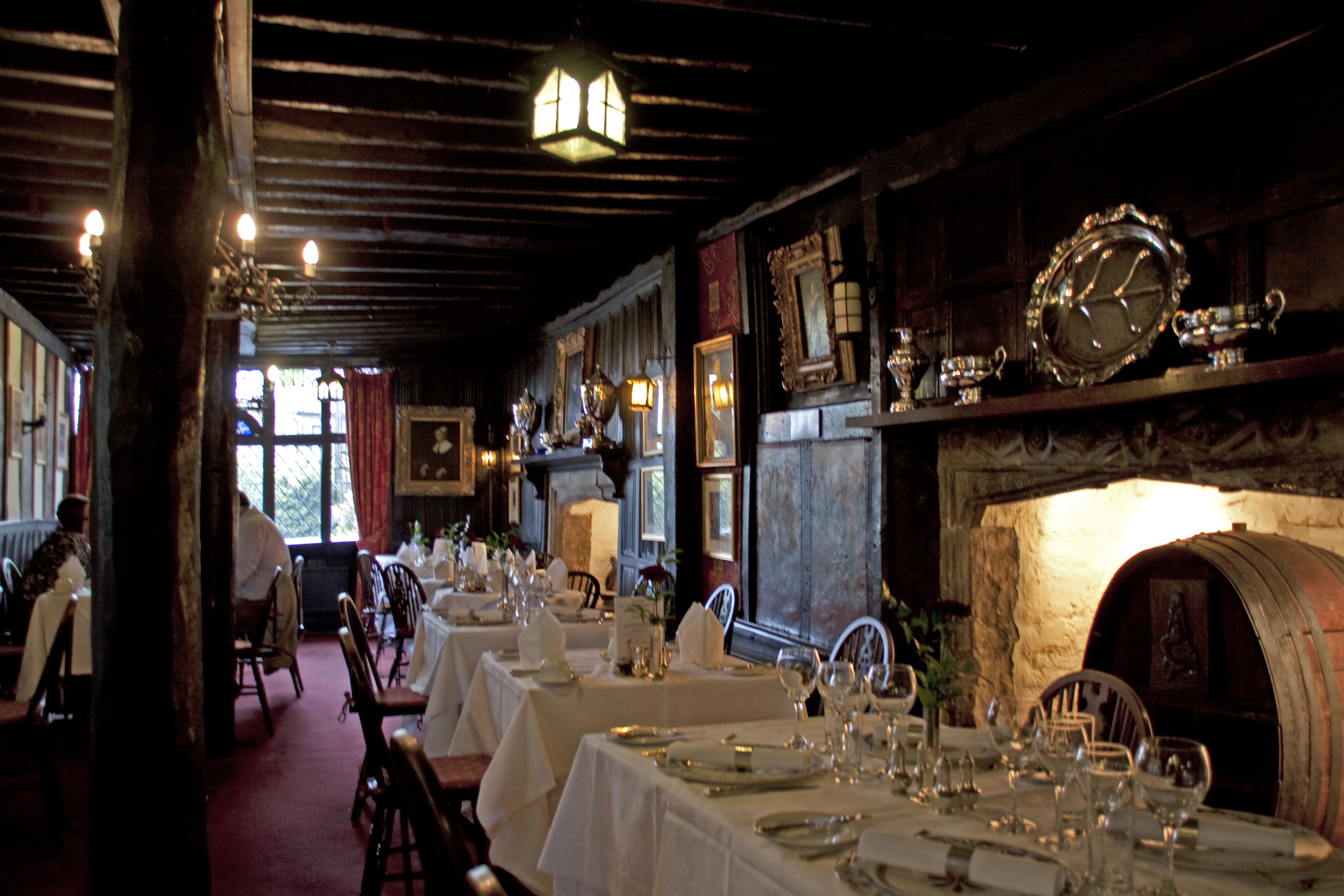
Dining room

The Mermaid Inn and has been subject to an investigation by Most Haunted. The events in one room have been described as "one of the most well-organised ghostly scenarios anywhere". Room 16 (Elizabethan) was said to be the scene of a duel involving two men "of unknown date and origin" (although they have also been described as wearing "16th-century clothing"). After fighting through some of the nearby rooms, one of the men was killed, dragged into the adjacent room and thrown through a trapdoor into the dungeon below.
