= Durhamford Manor =

Early 16th century English country house

Coordinates: 50.9419°N 0.5221°E

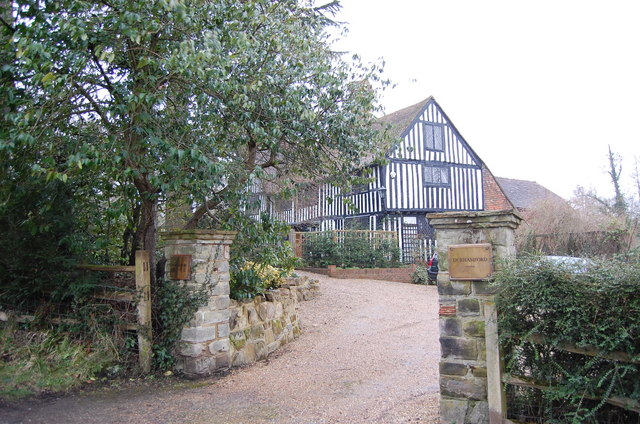
Durhamford Manor

Durhamford Manor is a Grade II* listed country house in the parish of Sedlescombe, East Sussex, England. The timber-framed, close-studded house dates to the early 16th century. The north front features a gable with scalloped bargeboards.
