= The Seven Stars Inn =

Seven Stars Inn
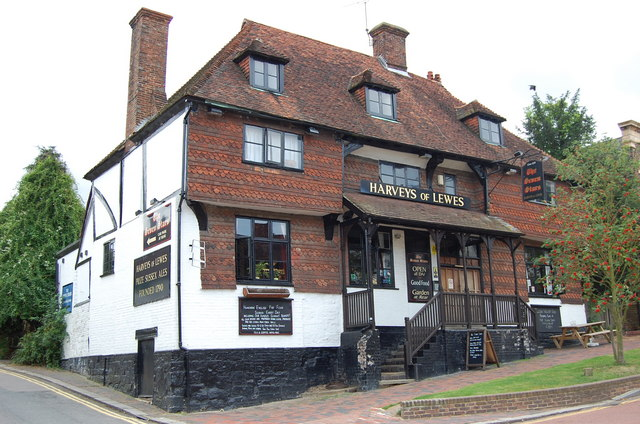
- The inn from the northwest

- Location within East Sussex
- 50.9858°N 0.4747°E
- Location: 34 High Street, Robertsbridge, East Sussex TN32 5AJ

History
- Built: c. 1400

Site notes
- Architectural style: Medieval

Listed Building – Grade II*
- Designated: 3 August 1961
- Reference no.: 1275146

The Seven Stars Inn is a 14th-century public house in Robertsbridge, East Sussex, a well-preserved example of a medieval building and a typical Sussex village pub. It is associated with historical events, both real and rumoured. As of at least autumn 2016, it was closed for business.

== Architecture ==
Built in about 1400 as a Wealden hall house in traditional Wealden timber frame, the building is Grade II* Listed. It was altered in the 16th century and re-faced in the 19th century. It has a recessed centre, with curved timber brackets supporting the eaves. The first floor oversails on brackets, and has a Crown-post-supported roof. Owned by Harveys, a brewery in Lewes, since February 2002, the pub has existed in its current form for at least 300 years.

== History ==
Medieval Robertsbridge was granted a market charter in the 13th century, and quickly became prosperous. The Seven Stars dates from this era of early prosperity. The earliest surviving building in the village is only 10 years older.

Folk history surrounding the building has rumoured that Charles II is said to have been confined there for a time during his escape from England following the Battle of Worcester. This is unlikely as Charles eventually escaped by ship from Shoreham, having travelled from the west.

=== Smugglers ===
Robertsbridge was within the area controlled by the Hawkhurst Gang, a criminal organisation involved in smuggling between 1735 and 1749. John Amos, a prominent member of the gang, lived in the village. The gang's influence extended from Kent to Dorset and they operated freely enough to use as many as 500 pack-horses to carry contraband, raiding a government customs house to recover captured goods. Robertsbridge itself was the site of a famous ambush. Thirty smugglers assembled, fortified with alcohol, and ambushed a wagon-load of seized contraband tea on Silver Hill, killing a customs officer in the process.

Member of Parliament Horace Walpole reported a miserable journey that ended at Robertsbridge in one of his letters to Richard Bentley, dated 5 August 1752. Arriving in "Rotherbridge" after passing Silver Hill, they found only one available bed, "all the rest were inhabited by smugglers".

== Hauntings ==
According to a local newspaper, the building has been named as one of the top ten most haunted pubs in the country. In July 2013, it was reported that Hidden Worlds Paranormal Support Group would be investigating to help the owners deal with an alleged poltergeist and other ghostly activity.
