= St Mary's Church, Rye =

Church in East Sussex, England

St. Mary-the-Virgin, Rye
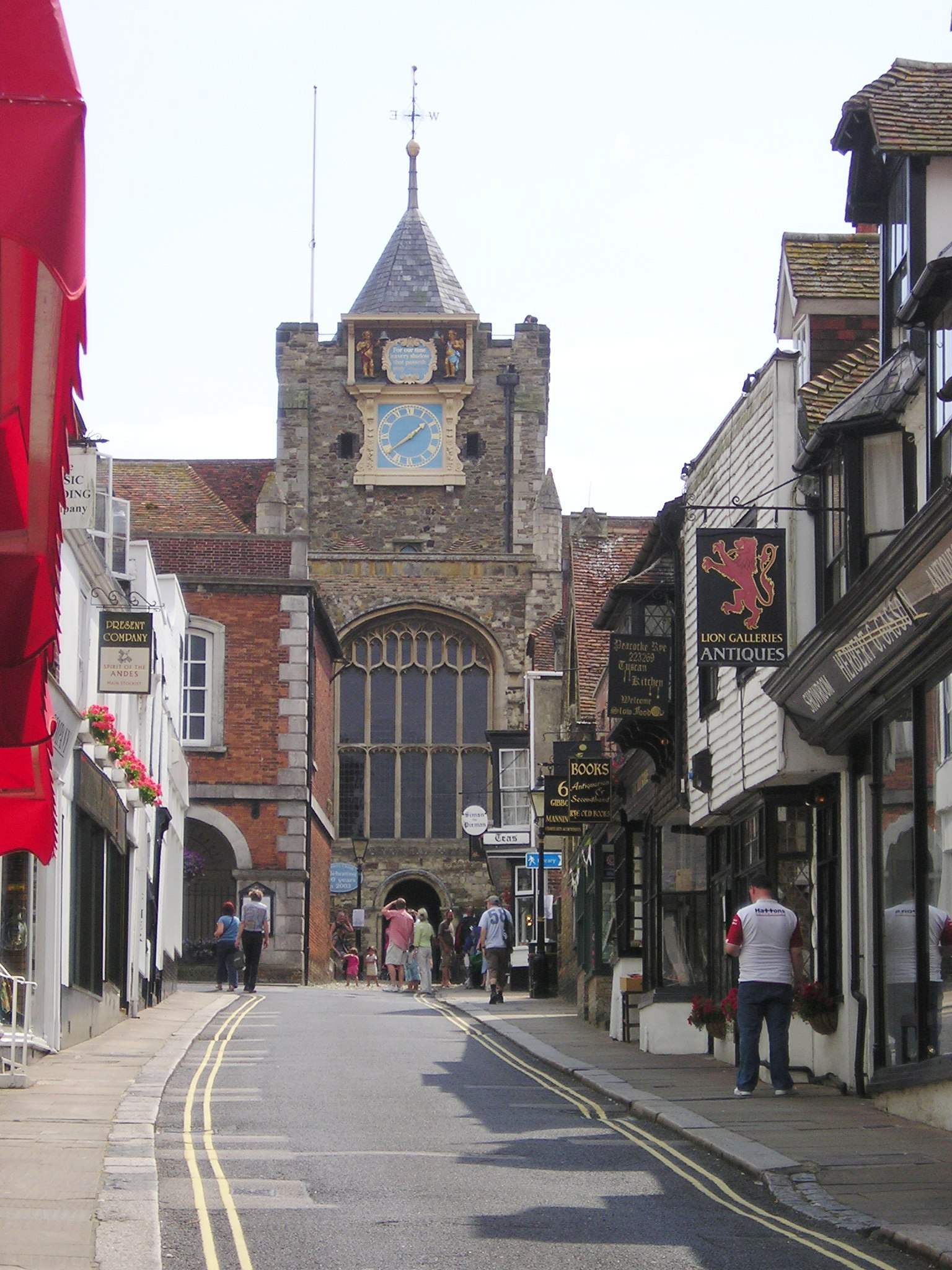
- St. Mary-the-Virgin, Rye
- 50.95008°N 0.73416°E
- Country: England
- Denomination: Anglican
- Religious institute: Parish Church

Architecture
- Architectural type: Gothic
- Style: Perpendicular Style

Administration
- Province: Canterbury
- Diocese: Chichester
- Archdeaconry: Hastings
- Deanery: Rye
- Parish: Rye with Rye Harbour

Listed Building – Grade I
- Official name: Church of St Mary
- Designated: 12 October 1951
- Reference no.: 1190669

St Mary-the-Virgin, Rye is the Anglican parish church of the civil parish of Rye in East Sussex. Since 1951 it is a Grade I listed building because of its architectural and historical interest.

== The building and its history ==
Rye had been held by the Abbey of Fécamp in Normandy for a long time as a Royal deed of gift. This status originating from times before the Norman Conquest got lost at 1247, but until this relationship ended the profit for the parish had been so great that a large church could be built, which was called the "Cathedral of East Sussex" until recent times. During a severe raid by French marauders, the town and the parish church were looted and set on fire. The damage to the church was extensive, and the last repairs resulting from this fire were made in the 19th century. The following year a group of men from Rye and Winchelsea struck back and recovered the loot including the stolen bells. To deter potential invaders from any future attack one of the bells was hung in the Watchbell Street. The Huguenot Lewys Billiard made the "New Clock", which is one of the oldest church turret clocks that still works. It had been installed in 1561–2. A huge pendulum reaching into the church's body was added later, as was the actual face of the clock and the so-called "Quarter Boys".

During the Reformation many precious items, that belonged to the church were sold or removed. Parts of the building became secular. The Chapels were separated from the church. They were used as a gaol, for storage for many things, including the town fire pump, and also as a butcher's shop. In the 17th and 19th centuries those changes were reversed and parts of the church renewed.

The church is a cruciform building. Its chancel, the crossing, transepts and the nave were built from 1150 to 1180. Alterations were made in the 15th century. North and South aisles were added during the late 12th century., North and South chapels 1220–1250. Flying buttresses were added at the south east end of the chancel in the 15th century. Very well worked out perpendicular windows can be seen at the east end of the chancel and south chapel. Pews were installed in the 19th century, but the mayor's seat is from 1547 and it is very well worked out. During civic services it is placed near to the pulpit, which is also from that time. The stained glass windows are mostly Victorian and include a window by Sir Edward Burne-Jones (1891) in memory of Mary Tiltman. It can be found in the north aisle.

== Murder ==
In 1742 the churchyard was the site of a crime. The butcher John Breeds accidentally murdered Allen Grebell instead of the mayor he really intended to kill. John Breeds was hanged and gibbeted. His skull, which is the only remains of him, was brought to the town hall and remains there. Both are still said to haunt the churchyard.

== See also ==
- Grade I listed buildings in East Sussex
- List of places of worship in Rother
