= Dallington, East Sussex =

Village in East Sussex, England

Coordinates: 50.947116°N 0.357868°E

Dallington
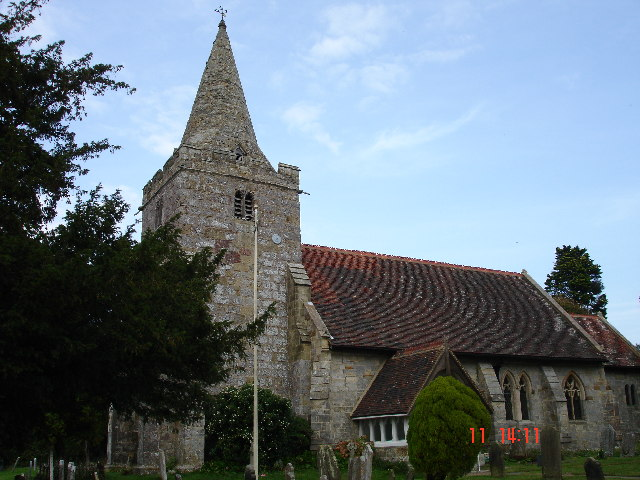

- Location within East Sussex
- Area: 7.9 km^{2} (3.1 sq mi)
- Population: 292 (Parish-2011)
  - Density: 102/sq mi (39/km^{2})
- OS grid reference: TQ657190
  - London: 43 miles (69 km) NNW
- District: Rother
- Shire county: East Sussex
- Region: South East
- Country: England
- Sovereign state: United Kingdom
- Post town: HEATHFIELD
- Postcode district: TN21
- Dialling code: 01435
- Police: Sussex
- Fire: East Sussex
- Ambulance: South East Coast
- UK Parliament: Bexhill and Battle
- Website: https://dallington.org.uk/

Dallington is a village and civil parish in the Rother district of East Sussex, England. It is located eight miles (13 km) west of Battle and five miles (8.0 km) east of Heathfield.

The parish church of St Giles is a Grade II* listed building. The unusual tower and spire date from the early 16th century, but the remainder was rebuilt in 1864 by architects Habershon and Brock.

== Governance ==
The lowest level of government is the Dallington Parish Council. The parish council is responsible for local amenities such as the provision of litter bins, bus shelters and allotments. They also provide a voice into the district council meetings. The parish council comprises five councillors with elections being held every four years.

The Rother District Council provides the next level of government with services such as refuse collection, planning consent, leisure amenities and council tax collection. Dallington lies within the Darwell ward, which provides two councillors.

The East Sussex County Council is the third tier of government, providing education, libraries and highway maintenance.

The UK Parliament constituency for Dallington is Bexhill and Battle.

Prior to Brexit in 2020, Dallington was part of the South East England constituency in the European Parliament.

== See also ==
- Brightling Park
- Dallington Forest
