= Rye Castle =

Castle in Rye, East Sussex, England, United Kingdom

- Part of the City of Rye
- East Sussex in England
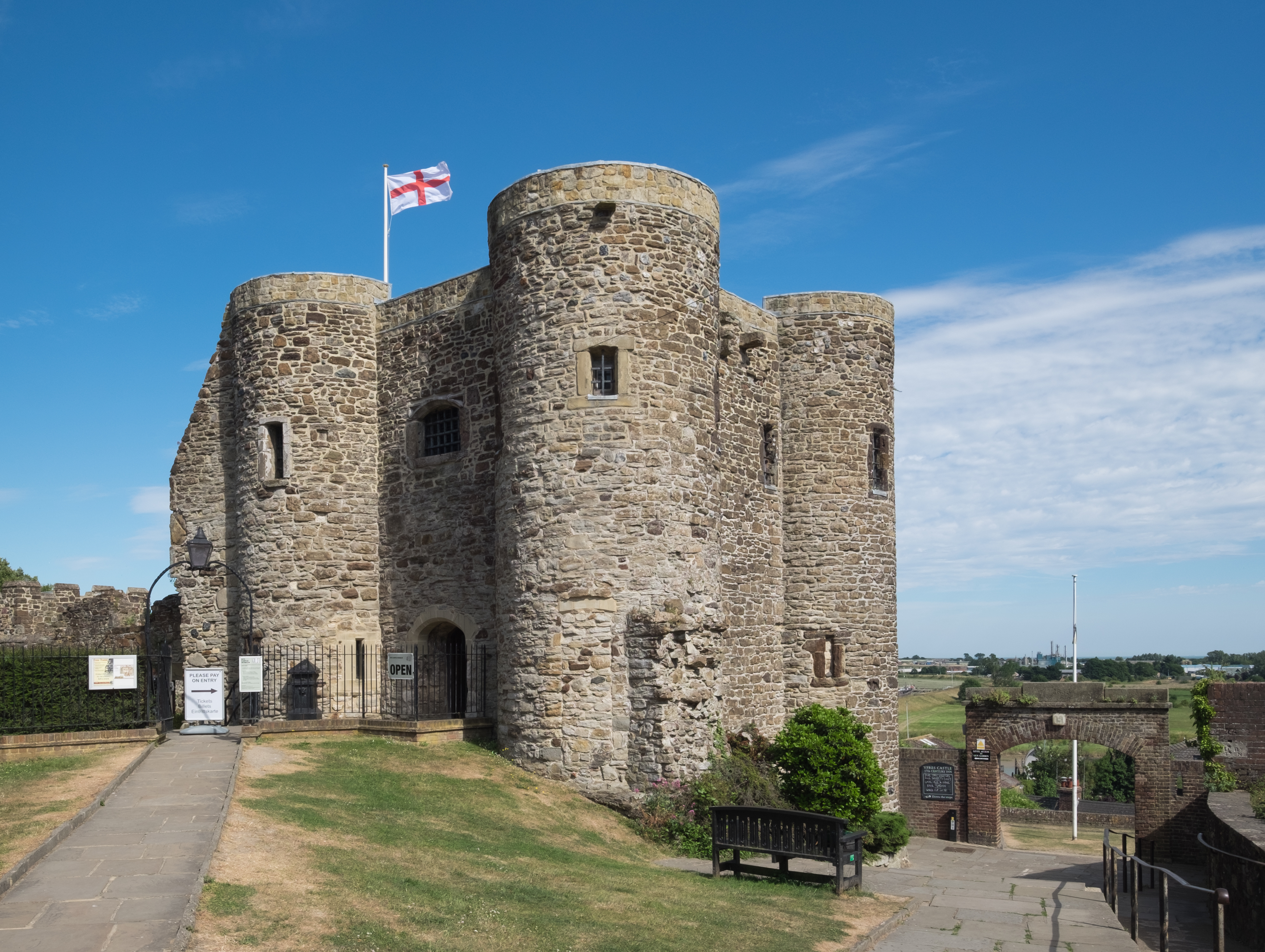
- The Ypres Tower

Site information
- Type: Castle
- Open to the public: Yes
- Condition: Standing

Location
- Location in East Sussex
- Coordinates: 50°56′59.35″N 0°44′8.11″E

Site history
- Built: 1249
- Built by: King Henry III
- In use: 1249-

Rye Castle, also known as Ypres Tower, was built in the 13th or 14th centuries, and is situated in Rye, East Sussex, England. It is a Grade I listed building and has been scheduled as an ancient monument.

== History ==
The exact date of construction is unclear although the possibility of creating a castle at Rye was mentioned in documents of 1226 and 1249. In 1329 Murage was applied for and works carried out during the 14th century before and after attacks by the French. Rye became one of the Cinque Ports and was involved in both defence and trade. It was originally called "Baddings Tower".

During King Henry VIII's Device Fort programme, an artillery battery, known as the Gun Garden, was constructed adjacent to the castle overlooking the harbour. It was rearmed at the time of the Spanish Armada of 1588, and again during the 18th century wars with France. In 1830, it was still in active service with 18 guns.

The castle may have been used as a prison and in 1430 became the property of John de Iprys; which lead to the name Ypres Tower. In the 16th century it was used as a prison and courthouse with a full-time gaoler being appointed in 1796. An exercise yard was added and then a women's prison in 1837. The prison function continued until 1891. It then became the town's morgue.

The tower was damaged during air raids in World War II but has been repaired and restored since then.

== Architecture ==
The three-storey castle is of iron-stained sandstone. It has a square plan with a round towers at each corner. The door in the north side is protected by a portcullis.

== Rye Castle Museum ==
Ypres Tower is one of two sites of Rye Castle Museum and is a grade I listed building. Exhibits in the tower include locally made medieval pottery, an embroidery depicting many aspects of Rye life and history, medieval artifacts, activities and town maps.

The East Street Site, a former brewer's bottling factory, is the main exhibit area for the Rye Castle Museum. Opened in 1999, the local history exhibits include fire fighting equipment, trade changes caused by the sea's retreat, maritime history and shipbuilding, antique toys and games, photos, town seals, and archaeological artifacts.
