= Rother District Council elections =

Local government elections in East Sussex, England

Rother District Council is the local authority for Rother District in East Sussex, England. The council is elected every four years. Since the last boundary changes in 2019 the council has comprised 38 councillors representing 21 wards, with each ward electing one or two councillors.

== Council elections ==
The table below is a summary of the council composition directly after each council election. Click on the year for full details of each election. Boundary changes took place for the 2003 election reducing the number of seats by 7.

Composition of the council
Year	Conservative	Liberal Democrats (Note: Includes totals for the predecessors of the Liberal Democrats, the Liberal Party and SDP (both of which participated in the Alliance).)	Labour	Green	RAOIC (Note: Rother Association of Independent Councillors)	Independents & Others	Council control after election
Local government reorganisation; council established (45 seats)
1973	9	1	5	–	–	30	Independent
1976	15	0	4	1	–	25	Independent
1979	20	1	3	0	–	21	No overall control
New ward boundaries (45 seats)
1983	24	4	3	0	–	14	Conservative
1987	29	4	2	0	–	10	Conservative
1991	20	16	3	0	–	6	No overall control
1995	14	21	5	0	–	5	No overall control
1999	28	8	5	0	–	4	Conservative
New ward boundaries (38 seats)
2003	25	8	3	0	–	2	Conservative
2007	28	8	0	0	–	2	Conservative
2011	27	5	2	0	–	4	Conservative
2015	31	2	1	0	–	4	Conservative
New ward boundaries (38 seats)
2019	14	7	3	1	–	13	No overall control
2023	10	7	8	3	8	2	No overall control

== District result maps ==
2003 results map

2007 results map

2011 results map

2015 results map

2019 results map

2023 results map

== By-election results ==
By-elections occur when seats become vacant between council elections. Below is a summary of recent by-elections; full by-election results can be found by clicking on the by-election name.

By-election	Date	Incumbent party	Winning party
Bexhill Central	19 September 1996	Liberal Democrats	Conservative
Beckley and Peasmarsh	27 February 1997	Conservative	Conservative
Central	25 September 1997	Liberal Democrats	Conservative
Bexhill Central by-election	7 June 2001	Conservative	Conservative
Bexhill St Mark's by-election	7 June 2001	Conservative	Conservative
Fairlight by-election	1 November 2001	Conservative	Conservative
Old Town by-election	17 October 2002	Liberal Democrats	Liberal Democrats
Bexhill Sackville by-election	9 September 2004	Conservative	Conservative
Bexhill St Stephens by-election	29 September 2005	Conservative	Conservative
Ticehurst and Etchingham by-election	17 November 2005	Conservative	Conservative
Bexhill Kewhurst by-election	4 May 2006	Conservative	Conservative
Bexhill Sackville by-election	4 May 2006	Conservative	Conservative
Bexhill St Marks by-election	4 May 2006	Conservative	Conservative
Bexhill Collington by-election	12 June 2008	Conservative	Conservative
Bexhill Sackville by-election	3 July 2008	Conservative	Conservative
Darwell by-election	31 July 2014	Conservative	Conservative
Battle Town by-election	16 July 2015	Conservative	Liberal Democrats
Collington by-election	27 October 2016	Independent	Independent
Darwell by-election	27 October 2016	Conservative	Conservative
St Marks by-election	10 January 2019	Independent	Independent
Eastern Rother by-election	6 May 2021	Conservative	Conservative
Brede and Udimore by-election	16 June 2022	Conservative	Conservative
Catsfield and Crowhurst by-election	26 June 2025	Liberal Democrats	Liberal Democrats
Rye and Winchelsea by-election	7 May 2026	Labour	Reform
