= 2007 Rother District Council election =

Local municipal election

Map of the results of the 2007 Rother District Council election. Conservatives in blue, Liberal Democrats in yellow and independents in light grey.

The 2007 Rother District Council election took place on 3 May 2007 to elect members of Rother District Council in East Sussex, England. The whole council was up for election and the Conservative Party stayed in overall control of the council.

== Background ==
At the last election in 2003 the Conservatives retained control of the council with 25 councillors, while the Liberal Democrats had 8, Labour had 3 and there were 2 independents. However, by the time of the 2007 election the Liberal Democrat group had been reduced to 6 councillors, while 2 of the 3 Labour councillors, Helen and Keith Bridger, had left the Labour party in December 2006 and stood at the election as independents. Meanwhile, the Conservative leader of the council Graham Gubby stood down at the election.

== Election result ==
The Conservatives increased their majority on the council after making a net gain of 2 seats to have 28 of the 38 councillors. The Conservatives narrowly defeated Liberal Democrat councillor John Kemp in Crowhurst by 2 votes after 3 recounts, while also taking out the only Labour councillor Samuel Souster in Rye. This meant Rother was one of more than 10 councils in which Labour lost their last presence on the council in the 2007 local elections.

The Liberal Democrats also gained 2 seats to have 8 councillors, after defeating Conservative councillors in Bexhill St Michael's and Battle Town ward. Meanwhile, the independents were reduced from 5 to 2 councillors, with Keith and Helen Bridger being defeated in Bexhill Sidley, while Eric Armstrong lost in Bexhill Old Town.

Following the election Conservative Carl Maynard became the new leader of the council.

Rother local election result 2007
Party	Seats	Gains	Losses	Net gain/loss	Seats %	Votes %	Votes	+/−
Conservative	28	4	2	+2	73.7	59.7	27,840	+2.2%
Liberal Democrats	8	3	1	+2	21.1	27.2	12,670	-3.0%
Independent	2	0	3	-3	5.3	6.0	2,784	+1.7%
Labour	0	0	1	-1	0	6.6	3,071	-1.4%
Green	0	0	0	0	0	0.5	252	+0.5%

== Ward results ==
Battle Town (2 seats)
Party	Candidate	Votes	%	±%
Liberal Democrats	Kathryn Field	892		
Liberal Democrats	Kevin Dixon	759		
Conservative	Paula Fisher	649		
Conservative	Bob White	532		
Labour	John Gately	165		
Turnout		2,997	42.6	+5.3
Liberal Democrats hold		Swing		
Liberal Democrats gain from Conservative		Swing		

Bexhill Central (2 seats)
Party	Candidate	Votes	%	±%
Conservative	Michael Ensor	672		
Conservative	Joy Hughes	667		
Liberal Democrats	Neil Francis	420		
Labour	Maurice Watson	252		
Turnout		2,011	33.7	+1.7
Conservative hold		Swing		
Conservative hold		Swing		

Bexhill Collington (2 seats)
Party	Candidate	Votes	%	±%
Conservative	Ronald Dyason	1,159		
Conservative	Christopher Starnes	1,158		
Liberal Democrats	Barbara Warburton	497		
Turnout		2,814	44.4	+1.2
Conservative hold		Swing		
Conservative hold		Swing		

Bexhill Kewhurst (2 seats)
Party	Candidate	Votes	%	±%
Conservative	Brian Kentfield	1,237		
Conservative	Martin Kenward	1,096		
Liberal Democrats	Joseph Ammoun	468		
Turnout		2,801	42.3	+0.6
Conservative hold		Swing		
Conservative hold		Swing		

Bexhill Old Town (2 seats)
Party	Candidate	Votes	%	±%
Liberal Democrats	Stuart Wood	454		
Liberal Democrats	Frances Winterborn	419		
Conservative	Richard Carroll	351		
Conservative	Annabelle West	332		
Independent	Eric Armstrong	295		
Labour	Mark Sivyer	135		
Turnout		1,986	37.3	+5.0
Liberal Democrats hold		Swing		
Liberal Democrats gain from Independent		Swing		

Bexhill Sackville (2 seats)
Party	Candidate	Votes	%	±%
Conservative	Deirdre Williams	660		
Conservative	Keith Standring	642		
Liberal Democrats	Jill Forster	564		
Liberal Democrats	Nick Hollington	533		
Independent	Peter Webb	200		
Labour	Abdullah Khan	114		
Turnout		2,713	40.9	+7.3
Conservative hold		Swing		
Conservative hold		Swing		

Bexhill Sidley (2 seats)
Party	Candidate	Votes	%	±%
Conservative	Jim Carroll	489		
Conservative	Robert Wheeler	425		
Independent	Keith Bridger	415		
Independent	Helen Bridger	402		
Labour	Philipa Coughlan	252		
Labour	Stephanie Webb	225		
Liberal Democrats	Brett Mclean	192		
Turnout		2,400		
Conservative gain from Independent		Swing		
Conservative gain from Independent		Swing		

Bexhill St Marks (2 seats)
Party	Candidate	Votes	%	±%
Conservative	Joanne Gadd	1,136		
Conservative	Patrick Douart	990		
Liberal Democrats	Rachel Hills	605		
Labour	John Heasman	133		
Turnout		2,864	44.7	+3.1
Conservative hold		Swing		
Conservative hold		Swing		

Bexhill St Michaels (2 seats)
Party	Candidate	Votes	%	±%
Independent	Charles Clark	787		
Liberal Democrats	Martyn Forster	565		
Conservative	Peter Fairhurst	493		
Turnout		1,845	36.2	+5.6
Independent hold		Swing		
Liberal Democrats gain from Conservative		Swing		

Bexhill St Stephens (2 seats)
Party	Candidate	Votes	%	±%
Conservative	Bridget George	722		
Conservative	Paul Lendon	690		
Liberal Democrats	Molly Webb	381		
Liberal Democrats	John Zipperlen	340		
Labour	Dominic Coughlan	211		
Turnout		2,344	36.3	−2.5
Conservative hold		Swing		
Conservative hold		Swing		

Brede Valley (2 seats)
Party	Candidate	Votes	%	±%
Conservative	Jonathan Johnson	905		
Conservative	Carl Maynard	873		
Liberal Democrats	John Smith	459		
Liberal Democrats	Frances James	431		
Labour	Mark Kenward	127		
Turnout		2,795	40.6	+2.6
Conservative hold		Swing		
Conservative hold		Swing		

Crowhurst
Party	Candidate	Votes	%	±%
Conservative	Angharad Davies	416	46.3	+10.3
Liberal Democrats	John Kemp	414	46.1	−9.4
Labour	Tim MacPherson	69	7.7	−0.8
Majority		2	0.2	
Turnout		899		
Conservative gain from Liberal Democrats		Swing		

Darwell (2 seats)
Party	Candidate	Votes	%	±%
Conservative	David Vereker	1,072		
Independent	Wendy Miers	685		
Liberal Democrats	Tom Sayer	469		
Turnout		2,226	42.0	+2.3
Conservative hold		Swing		
Independent hold		Swing		

Eastern Rother (2 seats)
Party	Candidate	Votes	%	±%
Conservative	Paul Osborne	970		
Conservative	Nick Ramus	939		
Liberal Democrats	Nicholas Cleveland-Stevens	394		
Labour	Jan Mears	350		
Turnout		2,653	44.2	+4.1
Conservative hold		Swing		
Conservative hold		Swing		

Ewhurst and Sedlescombe
Party	Candidate	Votes	%	±%
Conservative	Tony Ganly	657	66.4	−1.1
Liberal Democrats	Stephen Hardy	332	33.6	+1.1
Majority		325	32.9	−2.1
Turnout		989	49.5	+2.9
Conservative hold		Swing		

Marsham (2 seats)
Party	Candidate	Votes	%	±%
Conservative	Robin Patten	1,120		
Conservative	Roger Bird	1,063		
Labour	Nicholas Warren	264		
Turnout		2,447	45.5	−2.9
Conservative hold		Swing		
Conservative hold		Swing		

Rother Levels (2 seats)
Party	Candidate	Votes	%	±%
Conservative	Martin Mooney	1,006		
Conservative	Ron Parren	1,000		
Liberal Democrats	Jennifer Als	492		
Labour	Marie Hodgson	199		
Turnout		2,697	43.1	+8.6
Conservative hold		Swing		
Conservative hold		Swing		

Rye (2 seats)
Party	Candidate	Votes	%	±%
Liberal Democrats	Sonia Holmes	691		
Conservative	David Russell	684		
Labour	Samuel Souster	575		
Turnout		1,950	43.7	−0.6
Liberal Democrats hold		Swing		
Conservative gain from Labour		Swing		

Salehurst (2 seats)
Party	Candidate	Votes	%	±%
Liberal Democrats	Sue Prochak	857		
Liberal Democrats	George Hearn	668		
Conservative	Graham Browne	661		
Conservative	Geoffrey Goodsell	578		
Turnout		2,764	45.8	+3.1
Liberal Democrats hold		Swing		
Liberal Democrats hold		Swing		

Ticehurst and Etchingham (2 seats)
Party	Candidate	Votes	%	±%
Conservative	Robert Elliston	993		
Conservative	Ian Jenkins	803		
Liberal Democrats	Trevor Seemann	374		
Green	Don Nicholls	252		
Turnout		2,422	41.1	+2.5
Conservative hold		Swing		
Conservative hold		Swing		

== By-elections between 2007 and 2011 ==
=== Bexhill Collington ===
A by-election was held in Bexhill Collington on 12 June 2008 after the death of Conservative councillor Ron Dyason. The seat was held for the Conservatives by Gillian Wheeler with a majority of 677 votes over the Liberal Democrats.

Bexhill Collington by-election 12 June 2008
Party	Candidate	Votes	%	±%
Conservative	Gillian Wheeler	893	75.2	+5.1
Liberal Democrats	Christine Purdy	216	18.2	−11.8
Labour	Nicholas Coughlan	78	6.6	+6.6
Majority		677	57.0	
Turnout		1,187	31.8	−12.6
Conservative hold		Swing		

=== Bexhill Sackville ===
A by-election was held in Bexhill Sackville on 3 July 2008 after Conservative councillor Keith Standring resigned from the council. The seat was held for the Conservatives by Richard Carroll with a majority of 80 votes over the Liberal Democrats.

Bexhill Sackville by-election 3 July 2008
Party	Candidate	Votes	%	±%
Conservative	Richard Carroll	571	49.4	+6.5
Liberal Democrats	Peter Webb	491	42.5	+5.8
Labour	Paul Theaker	93	8.1	+0.6
Majority		80	6.9	
Turnout		1,155	31.5	−9.4
Conservative hold		Swing		
