= Henry Ward (architect) =

British architect

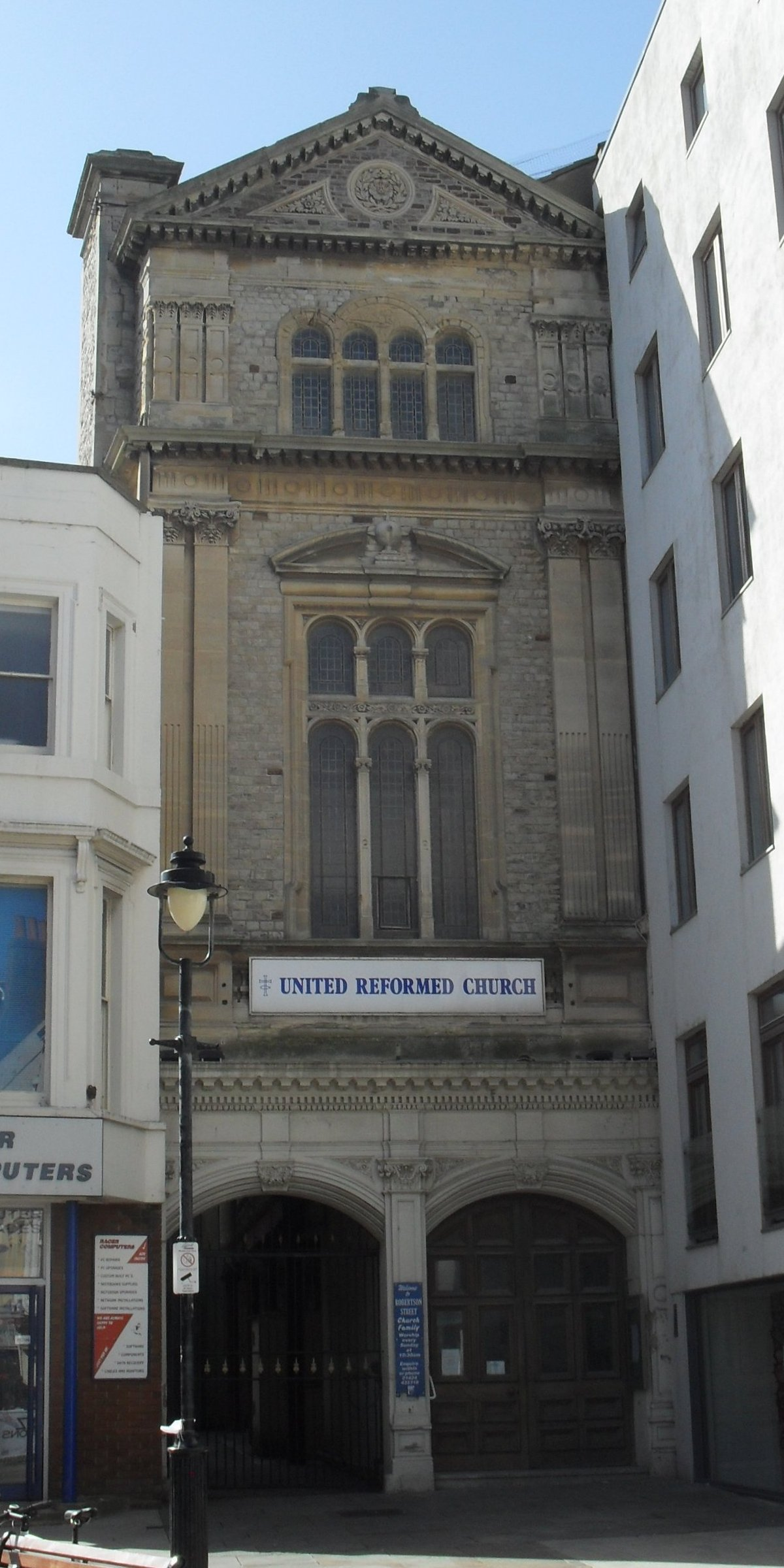
Ward designed the Robertson Street Congregational Church in Hastings in 1884–85.

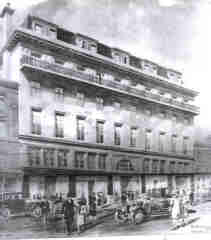
Plummer Roddis building in 1927

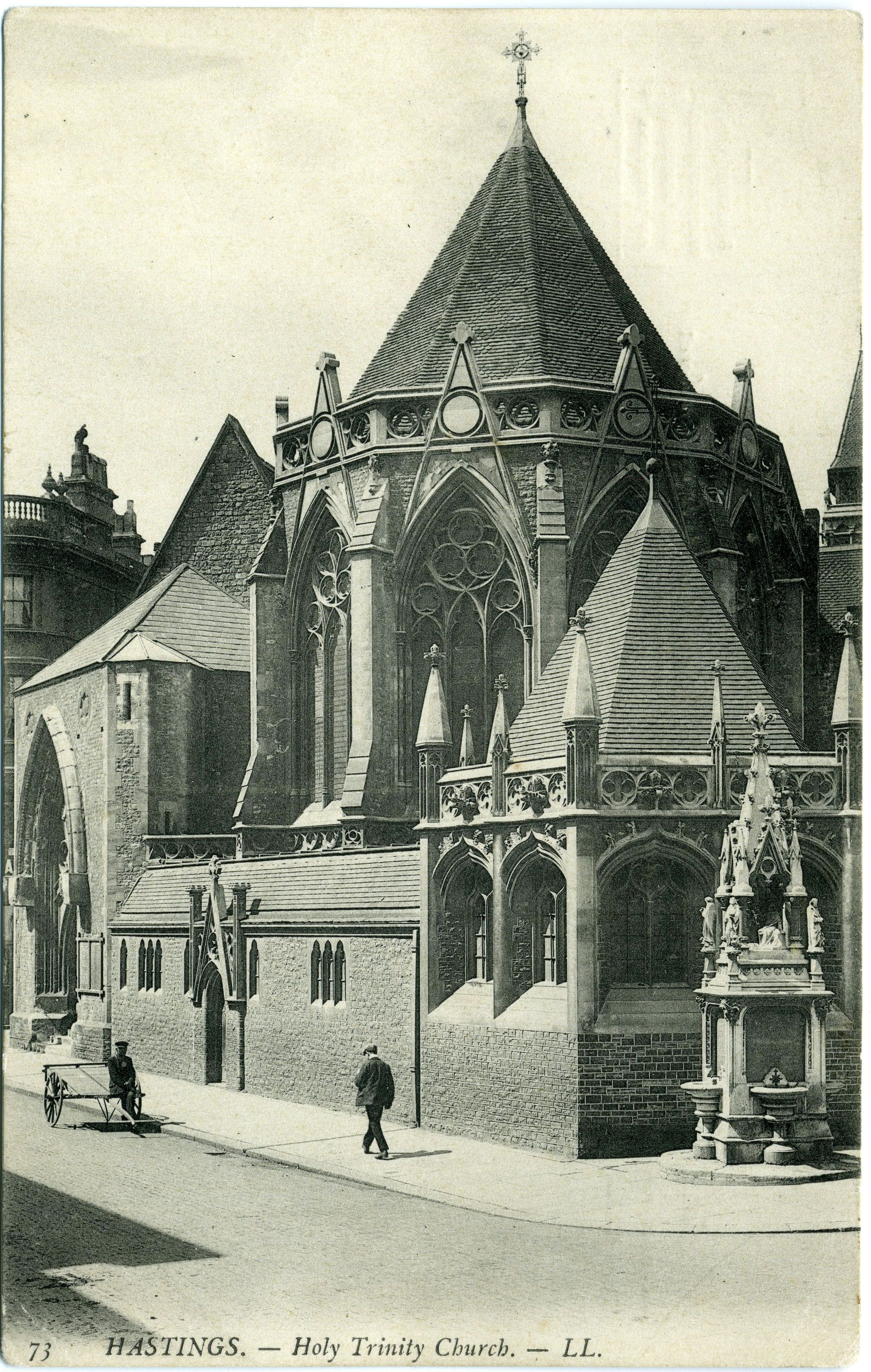
Holy Trinity, Hastings: Ward added the Lady Chapel in 1907

Henry Ward ARIBA (c. 1852 – 9 September 1927) was a British architect who designed many large public buildings in and around Hastings, East Sussex, some of which are listed buildings.

== Biography ==
Henry Ward was born in Peckham, London, the son of tailor Edward John Ward and Susannah Ward. He arrived in Hastings in his late twenties after being articled at architectural practices in London and Paris. Ward briefly worked for and under the guidance of architect Walter Liberty Vernon and during the 50 years he worked in the town he designed buildings from his architectural practice at 8 Bank Buildings.

== Designs ==
One of his first designs was the listed Gothic Revival Hastings Town Hall (1881) in Queens Road, which originally included the Police Court with cells. He also designed Bexhill Town Hall (1895). He was responsible for a number of churches in Hastings and around Sussex including the United Reformed Church in Robertson Street, Hastings, St Johns, Bexhill, St Stephens, Bexhill, and The Chapel in Priory Road. In 1907 he added the Lady Chapel to the Holy Trinity Church, Hastings.

The commercial buildings he designed include the print-works and offices for Observer Building, Hastings, with its unique for the area terracotta-glazed frontage produced by the brick company Ibstock Hathernware. As of December 2019, the building is being brought back into use under the stewardship of Jess Steele. Besides this, he designed a number of stores around South East England for the Plummer Roddis chain of department stores, the Buchanan Hospital women's wing at St Leonards-on-Sea, the listed tiles and bar at the Havelock Public House, the Buccaneer Public House in Eastbourne, as well as changes to the front of the Queen Victoria Hotel in St Leonards-on-Sea.

== Legacy ==
A few days after his death in 1927, the Plummer Roddis department store (now Debenhams) was opened and was regarded as the finest design he had produced and remains as the largest and most imposing building in the Town Centre of Hastings near to his original offices. In his home town and often working with awkward sites, Ward created a range of architectural styles of innovative construction, and in the words of the Obituary published by RIBA:

"Many monuments to the ability and artistic skill of the late Mr Ward remain to keep alive the memory of a man who was widely known and respected throughout Hastings and in professional circles throughout the country."

He died on 9 September 1927. His architectural practice was continued until at least 1960 by his son Mr Henry D Ward.

== List of works ==
- Sedlescombe Congregational Chapel, Sedlescombe (1879 – attributed)
- Hastings Town Hall, Queens Road - Police Court & cells (1881)
- Robertson Street United Reformed Church, Hastings (1884)
- St John's Congregational Church, Bexhill-on-Sea (1897)
- St Stephen's Church, Bexhill-on-Sea (1898)
- Bexhill Town Hall, Bexhill-on-Sea (1898)
- South Street Free Church, Eastbourne (1903)
- Redlake Congregational Church, Ore (1903; demolished 1978)
- Buchanan Hospital (Elizabeth Mason Wing), St Leonards-on-Sea (1907)
- Lady chapel at Holy Trinity Church, Hastings (1907)
- Brightling Mission Church, Hollingrove (1909)
- F.J. Parsons Printworks (Observer Building), Hastings
- Buccaneer public house, Eastbourne
- Changes to frontage of Queen Victoria Hotel, St Leonards-on-Sea
- Refit of the bar and the tile murals at Havelock public house
- Plummer Roddis (Debenhams) department store, Hastings (1927)
- Alterations to The Gothic House, Western Road, Brighton for Plummer Roddis (c. 1920)
