= Sally-Ann Hart =

British politician

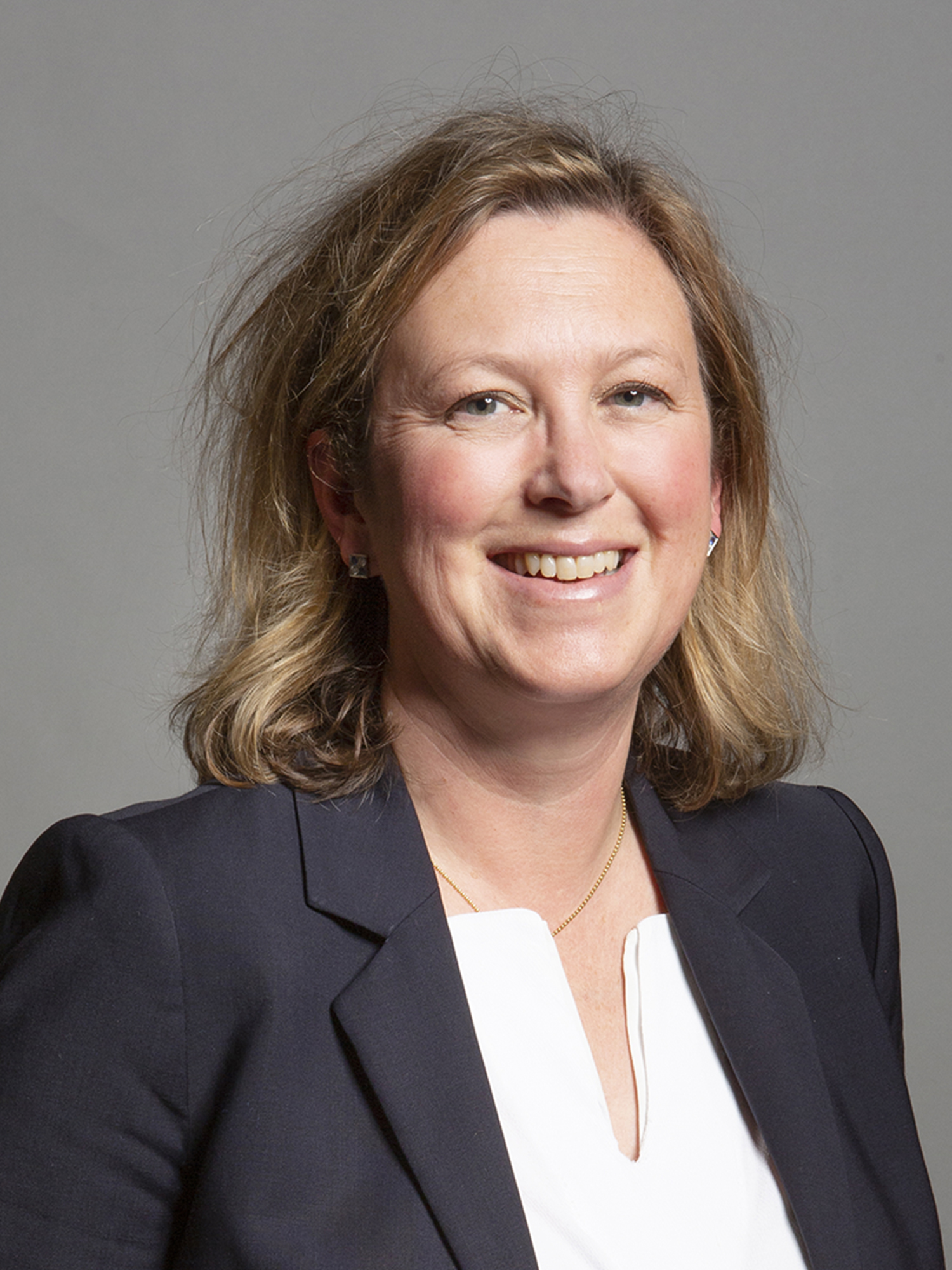
- Official portrait, 2019

Member of Parliament for Hastings and Rye
- In office 12 December 2019 – 30 May 2024
- Preceded by: Amber Rudd
- Succeeded by: Helena Dollimore

Personal details
- Born: 6 March 1968 (age 58) Tynemouth, Northumberland, England
- Party: Conservative
- Website: www.sallyannhart.org.uk

Sally-Ann Hart (born 6 March 1968) is a British politician who was the member of parliament (MP) for Hastings and Rye from 2019 to 2024. A member of the Conservative Party, she succeeded Amber Rudd, the former home secretary.

== Early life and career ==
Hart grew up in Hexham, Northumberland. She studied geography at King's College London before qualifying as a lawyer and working for a law firm in the City of London. She went on to become a solicitor and then a magistrate in Hastings with a focus on family law, and she has cited this work as one of her motivations for becoming a member of parliament. Before her election as an MP, Hart was a magistrate in Hastings.

== Political career ==
=== Councillor ===
The first elected position Hart was elected to was as a councillor representing the Eastern Rother ward on Rother District Council in East Sussex. First elected in 2015, she was re-elected in 2019. On the council, Hart held the position of cabinet member for tourism and culture.

=== Member of parliament ===
Hart stood as the Conservative Party candidate for North West Durham at the 2017 general election. Receiving 16,516 votes (34.5%), she failed to be elected by 8,792 votes, finishing in second place behind the Labour Party candidate, Laura Pidcock.

At the 2019 general election, Hart was selected to stand as the Conservative candidate for Hastings and Rye. At a constituency hustings on 5 December 2019, she was asked about an article she had shared on Facebook which suggested that people with learning difficulties should not be guaranteed a minimum wage. She defended the view, and said "it's about the happiness to work" and that "some people with learning difficulties, they don't understand about money". In a statement made to The Guardian, Hart said, "I was trying to emphasise that more needs to be done to help those with learning disabilities into the workplace and having properly paid work. My comments have been taken out of context, but I do apologise if any offence or alarm has been caused."

Hart was elected as MP for Hastings and Rye 12 December 2019 with 26,896 votes (49.6%) and a majority of 4,043 votes, an increase from the previous majority of 346.

In December 2019, an inquiry was initiated by the Conservative Party into Hart after it was discovered that, in 2017, she had shared a video which contained the conspiracy theory that the Jewish billionaire George Soros controls the European Union. She liked a comment underneath the video which said "Ein Reich" ("One Empire"), a Nazi slogan. A second investigation was opened days later over her sharing a blog post, in January 2017, by the anti-Islam activist Cheri Berens. Hart described the blog, in which Berens condemned the 2017 Women's March against US President Donald Trump as being used to promote a "Muslim agenda", as an "affecting read".

On 10 August 2020, in an interview with Krishnan Guru-Murthy for Channel 4 News, Hart said that the investigation into the allegations over her social media posts had concluded and that she was "not found to be anti-Semitic, Islamophobic or anything else", although she had attended social media training.

On 19 January 2021, Hart was one of 33 Conservative MPs to rebel against the government in support of the Genocide Amendment to the Trade Bill, alongside other Conservative parliamentarians including David Davis and Iain Duncan Smith.

Following an interim report on the connections between colonialism and properties now in the care of the National Trust, including links with historic slavery, Hart was among the signatories of a letter to The Daily Telegraph in November 2020 from the "Common Sense Group" of Conservative parliamentarians. The letter accused the National Trust of being "coloured by cultural Marxist dogma, colloquially known as the 'woke agenda'".

In February 2023, the Hastings & Rye Conservative Association deselected Hart as its candidate for the next general election, but she was reselected in a members' ballot in March 2023.

Hart introduced a private members' bill to the House of Commons (Child Support Collection (Domestic Abuse) Act 2023) in 2023. It had its first reading on 15 June 2023. The bill was jointly sponsored by Lord Farmer and received royal assent on 29 June 2023.

=== Parliamentary committees and APPGs ===
From May 2020, Hart was a member of the Scottish Affairs Select Committee and the Speaker's Advisory Committee on Works of Art. She was also a member of the Education (Careers Guidance in Schools) Bill Committee in September 2021.

Hart was the chair, vice-chair or an officer of several all-party parliamentary groups including on special educational needs and disability (SEND), school exclusions and alternative provision, almshouses and wetlands. She was also the secretary of the APPG on hospitality and tourism.

== Post-parliamentary career ==
Following her defeat at the 2024 election, Hart was appointed as Director at transport company KentSussex Connect Ltd.

== Personal life ==
Hart was born in Northumberland. She is married with three grown-up children.

== Electoral history ==
UK general elections
Date of election	Constituency	Party	Votes	% of votes	Result
2017 general election	North West Durham	Conservative	16,516	34.5	Not elected
2019 general election	Hastings and Rye	Conservative	26,896	49.6	Elected
2024 general election	Hastings and Rye	Conservative	10,481	22.8	Not elected

Parliament of the United Kingdom
Preceded by Amber Rudd	Member of Parliament for Hastings and Rye; 2019–2024	Succeeded by Helena Dollimore
