= Observer Building, Hastings =

Building in Hastings, East Sussex, England

Coordinates: 50.8555°N 0.5759°E

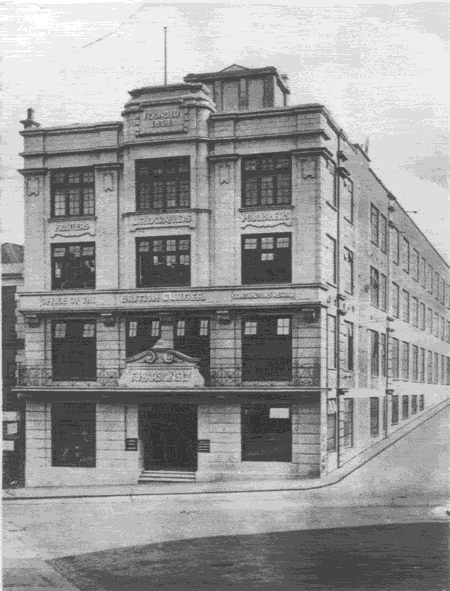
The Observer Building in 1924

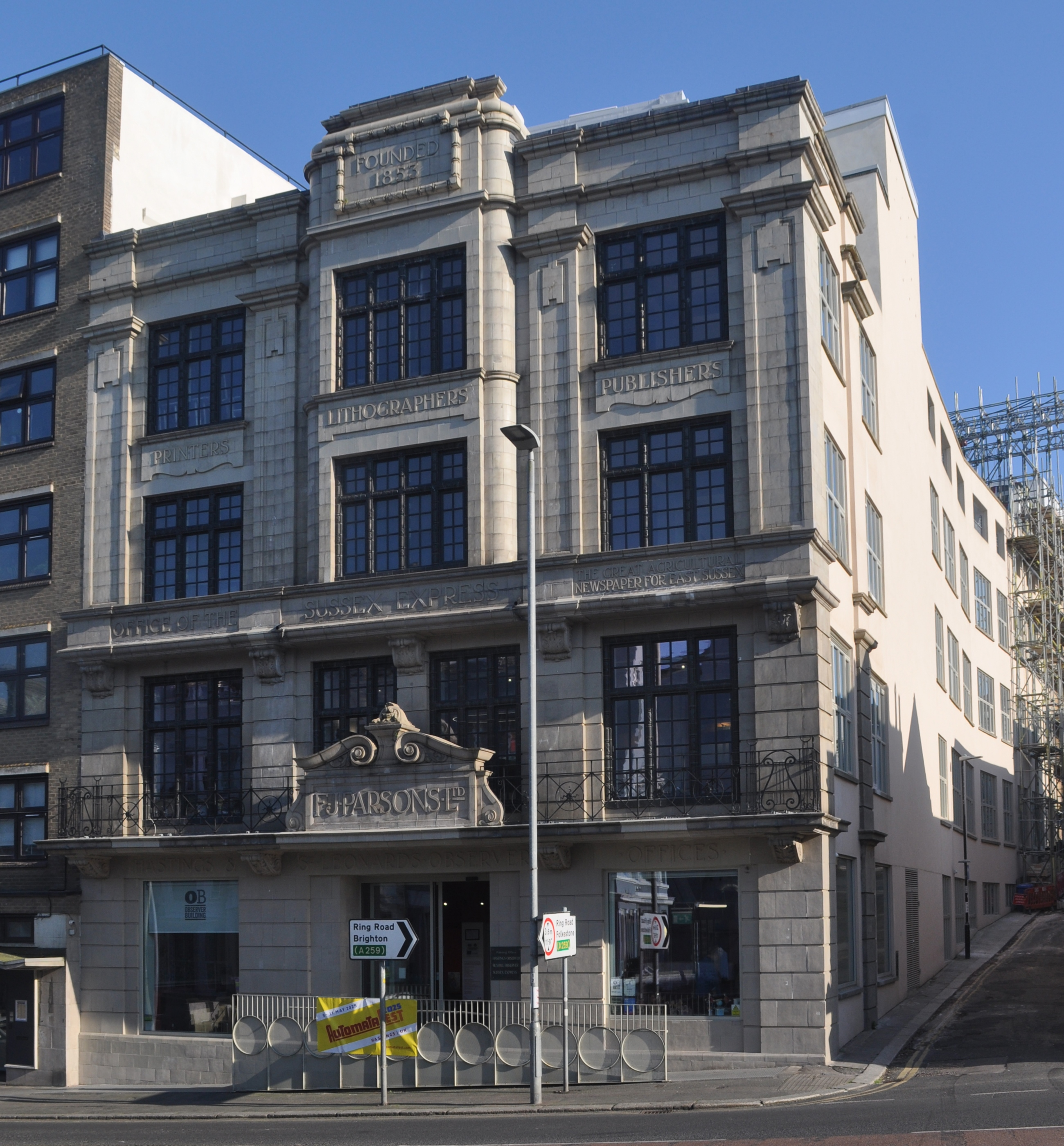
The Observer Building in 2025

The Observer Building is a building on Cambridge Road, Hastings, England. It was originally occupied by the print works and editorial offices of the Hastings & St. Leonards Observer newspaper. Between 1924 and 1984 it housed 500 employees. The building later became a significant local landmark, and was described as "one of the most imposing [buildings] in Hastings" by the BBC News.

== Architecture ==
Designed by architect Henry Ward, the building has a distinctive terracotta-glazed façade produced by the brick company Ibstock Hathernware with the original owner's name incorporated into the moulding. It features concrete mezzanine flooring.

Prior to construction, the site was occupied by terraced buildings similar to those further down the hill towards the town centre.

The printing presses were located on the lower floors behind the building, and extended into the sandstone caves behind Claremont. Similar to the adjacent Brassey Institute, portions of the building which contain these caves date back as far as 1859.

== Abandonment ==
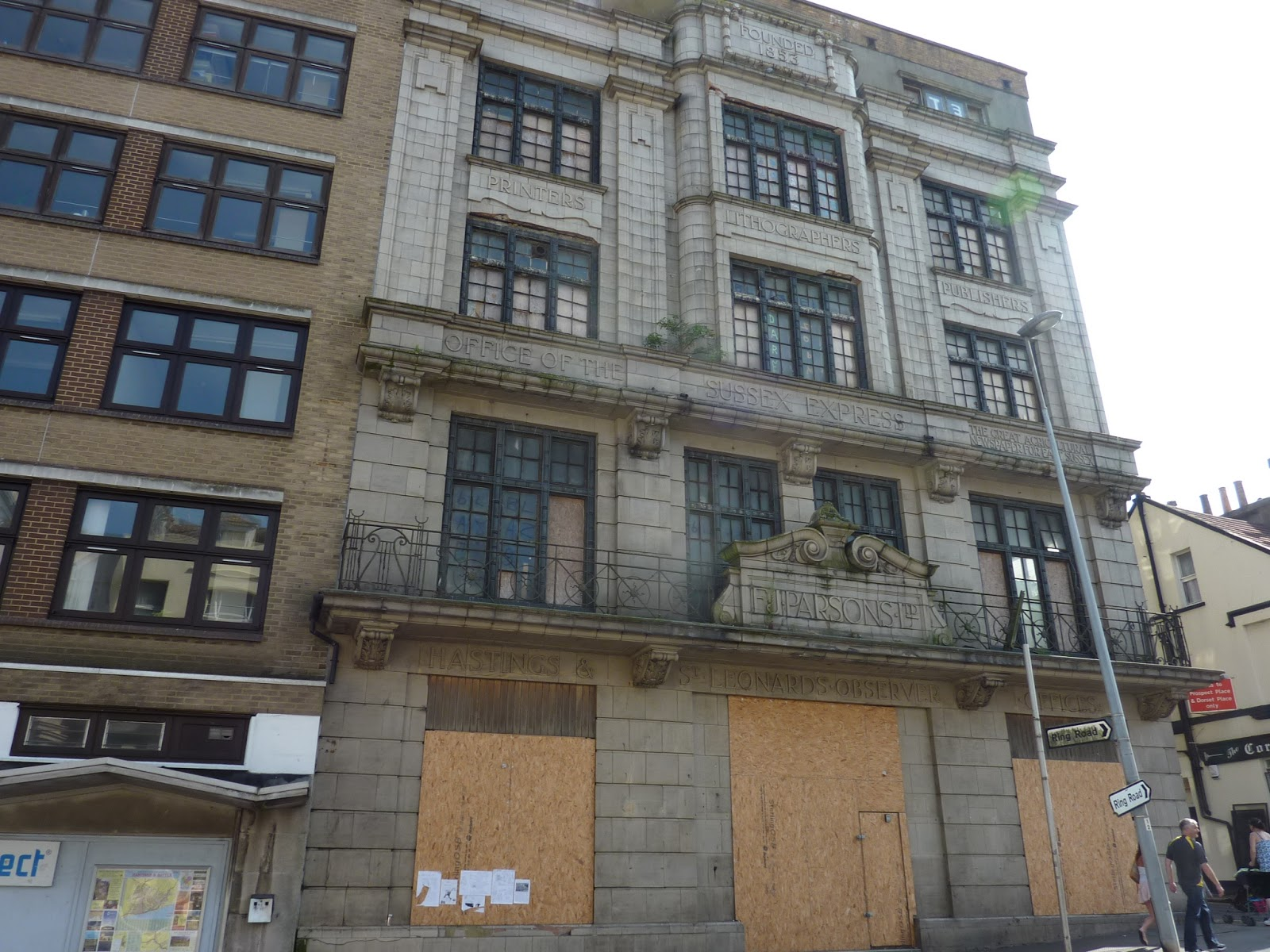
2013 View of the building

When the Observer's offices moved to a new location on the outskirts of Hastings, the building fell into disrepair for a number of years. A music rehearsal and recording studio did operate from the basement of the building around 1991, but it stayed otherwise unoccupied for around 34 years.

There were plans to demolish the building in 2006, however they were not implemented due to several local residents' objections. A developer purchased the building in 2014 but failed to get his plans approved by the local council, resulting in the building being left vacant again. Further plans were proposed to turn the building into accommodation for students attending the local campus of Brighton University in 2016, but these plans also did not materialize as the University pulled out of Hastings.

In 2017, the Hastings Borough Council approved plans for an artistry studio on the lower ground floor, a residents’ gym on the mezzanine level, a restaurant and shop, plus 50 private flats and a private roof terrace. These plans did not come to fruition, and after some essential work had been carried out on the internal structure the building was put back up for sale for £1.5 million.

== Restoration and current use ==
Hastings Commons Neighbourhood Ventures, who occupy the building next to the Observer Building, purchased the Observer Building for £1.15 million in late 2018 under the leadership of Jess Steele. The purchase included a ten-year plan to bring the building back into use which included 16 capped rent flats for those struggling to find housing, a floor of co-working studios and offices, 3 floors occupied by leisure businesses, activities and events, and a roof garden with a glasshouse and bar/common room.

These current plans are being carried out using funding provided by numerous local groups as well as grants from organizations such as Big Issue Invest, Castlestone Investments, Hastings Borough Council, Historic England, Youth Investment Fund and l East Sussex County Council.

After major renovations, the lower 4 floors of the building are being utilised for various local events, such as pop up cinemas, art exhibitions, and theatre. There are also office, co-working spaces, a digital technology hub, a youth centre and a gym.
