= 2015 Rother District Council election =

2015 UK local government election

Map of the results of the 2015 Rother District Council election. Conservatives in blue, independents in light grey, Liberal Democrats in yellow and Labour in red.

The 2015 Rother District Council election took place on 7 May 2015 to elect members of Rother District Council in East Sussex, England. The whole council was up for election and the Conservative Party stayed in overall control of the council.

== Background ==
At the last election in 2011 the Conservatives remained in control of the council with 27 councillors, while the Liberal Democrats took 5 seats, independents 4 seats and the Labour Party won 2 seats. By the time of the 2015 election three of the Conservative councillors for Bexhill had resigned from the Conservatives to sit as independents. Deirdre Williams and Paul Lendon left the party in July 2012 and then in May 2014 Joanne Gadd also became an independent councillor.

== Election result ==
The Conservatives increased their majority on the council after winning 31 seats, up from 24 before the election. This came at the expense of the independents who were reduced in number from seven to four. The Liberal Democrats also dropped three seats to have two councillors, with the group leader Kevin Dixon defeated by 65 votes in Battle. The Labour group leader Sam Souster was also defeated in Rye, leaving the party with only one councillor.

Rother local election result 2015
Party	Seats	Gains	Losses	Net gain/loss	Seats %	Votes %	Votes	+/−
Conservative	31	7	0	+7	81.6	48.8	39,720	-4.4%
Independent	4	0	3	-3	10.5	12.2	9,910	+3.8%
Liberal Democrats	2	0	3	-3	5.3	13.2	10,720	-7.8%
Labour	1	0	1	-1	2.6	15.2	12,340	-0.6%
UKIP	0	0	0	0	0	8.7	7,105	+8.7%
Green	0	0	0	0	0	1.9	1,556	+0.3%

== Ward results ==
Battle Town (2 seats)
Party	Candidate	Votes	%	±%
Liberal Democrats	Kathryn Field	1,481		
Conservative	Martin Noakes	1,199		
Liberal Democrats	Kevin Dixon	1,134		
Labour	Andrew Shepherd	469		
Turnout		4,283	69.9	+21.9
Liberal Democrats hold		Swing		
Conservative gain from Liberal Democrats		Swing		

Bexhill Central (2 seats)
Party	Candidate	Votes	%	±%
Conservative	Joy Hughes	824		
Conservative	Abul Azad	735		
Labour	Paul Courtel	709		
Labour	Ruairi McCourt	603		
UKIP	Michael Phillips	558		
Independent	Paul Plim	355		
Independent	Mark Plews	347		
Liberal Democrats	John Tunbridge	226		
Independent	Andrew Crotty	79		
Turnout		4,436	63.2	+25.5
Conservative hold		Swing		
Conservative hold		Swing		

Bexhill Collington (2 seats)
Party	Candidate	Votes	%	±%
Independent	Tony Mansi	1,309		
Independent	Doug Oliver	1,220		
Conservative	Michael Ensor	973		
Conservative	Colin Darker	847		
UKIP	Alison Phillips	417		
Green	John Gray	282		
Labour	Kate Bird	280		
Turnout		5,328	78.1	+20.6
Independent hold		Swing		
Independent hold		Swing		

Bexhill Kewhurst (2 seats)
Party	Candidate	Votes	%	±%
Conservative	Brian Kentfield	1,675		
Conservative	Martin Kenward	1,281		
UKIP	Lynne Hehir	957		
Labour	Yvonne Cleland	663		
Turnout		4,576	71.1	+19.4
Conservative hold		Swing		
Conservative hold		Swing		

Bexhill Old Town (2 seats)
Party	Candidate	Votes	%	±%
Conservative	Gillian Johnson	618		
Conservative	Jacqueline Potts	611		
UKIP	James Taylor	510		
Liberal Democrats	Vivienne Bond	383		
Labour	Roger McCarthy	367		
Liberal Democrats	Diane Smith	262		
Green	Linda Hills	229		
Independent	Saleh Uddin	222		
Independent	Sandy Melvin	219		
Turnout		3,421	65.6	+22.9
Conservative gain from Liberal Democrats		Swing		
Conservative gain from Liberal Democrats		Swing		

Bexhill Sackville (2 seats)
Party	Candidate	Votes	%	±%
Conservative	Ian Hollidge	742		
Conservative	Patrick Douart	709		
Independent	Deirdre Williams	680		
Independent	Yolanda Laybourne	626		
UKIP	Sheila Allen-Rodgers	563		
Labour	Paul Theaker	543		
Turnout		3,863	64.6	+18.7
Conservative gain from Independent		Swing		
Conservative hold		Swing		

Bexhill Sidley (2 seats)
Party	Candidate	Votes	%	±%
Labour	Maurice Watson	702		
Conservative	Jimmy Carroll	694		
Conservative	Becky Bowley	644		
Labour	Alan Bearne	619		
UKIP	Barry Last	573		
Independent	Helen Bridger	304		
Independent	Keith Bridger	261		
Turnout		3,797	57.1	+18.1
Labour hold		Swing		
Conservative hold		Swing		

Bexhill St. Marks (2 seats)
Party	Candidate	Votes	%	±%
Independent	Stuart Earl	1,312		
Conservative	Thomas Graham	1,148		
Independent	Joanne Gadd	808		
Conservative	Brett Mclean	671		
UKIP	Andrew Ellis	608		
Labour	Timothy Fox	318		
Turnout		4,865	74.0	+19.3
Independent hold		Swing		
Conservative gain from Independent		Swing		

Bexhill St. Michaels (2 seats)
Party	Candidate	Votes	%	±%
Independent	Charles Clark	1,134		
Conservative	Simon Elford	789		
UKIP	Richard Corner	613		
Independent	Laura Fermor	499		
Labour	Conor Hill	410		
Turnout		3,445	63.3	+20.8
Independent hold		Swing		
Conservative hold		Swing		

Bexhill St. Stephens (2 seats)
Party	Candidate	Votes	%	±%
Conservative	Richard Carroll	914		
Conservative	Bridget George	884		
UKIP	Pat Lee	754		
Labour	Richard Sage	563		
Independent	Paul Lendon	535		
Liberal Democrats	Graham Martin-Royle	379		
Turnout		4,029	66.9	+25.7
Conservative gain from Independent		Swing		
Conservative hold		Swing		

Brede Valley (2 seats)
Party	Candidate	Votes	%	±%
Conservative	Carl Maynard	1,818		
Conservative	Jonathan Johnson	1,685		
Labour	Elaine Lee	455		
Labour	Cheryl Creaser	443		
Liberal Democrats	Ian Stone	428		
Liberal Democrats	Robert Wakeford	228		
Turnout		5,057	74.2	+25.3
Conservative hold		Swing		
Conservative hold		Swing		

Crowhurst
Party	Candidate	Votes	%	±%
Conservative	Gary Curtis	771	49.2	−2.5
Liberal Democrats	Tracy Dixon	307	19.6	−17.5
Labour	Brian Basham	260	16.6	+5.4
UKIP	Tony Smith	228	14.6	+14.6
Majority		464	29.6	+15.0
Turnout		1,566	75.3	+22.7
Conservative hold		Swing		

Darwell (2 seats)
Party	Candidate	Votes	%	±%
Conservative	Emily Rowlinson	1,419		
Conservative	Eleanor Kirby-Green	1,213		
UKIP	Eddie Smith	574		
Liberal Democrats	Mary Varrall	564		
Green	Andrew Wedmore	510		
Labour	Christopher Husbands	347		
Turnout		4,627	68.7	+20.0
Conservative hold		Swing		
Conservative hold		Swing		

Eastern Rother (2 seats)
Party	Candidate	Votes	%	±%
Conservative	Sally-Ann Hart	1,441		
Conservative	Paul Osborne	1,392		
Labour	Nick Warren	705		
Labour	Paul Carey	694		
Liberal Democrats	Rachel Hills	332		
Turnout		4,564	71.4	+21.6
Conservative hold		Swing		
Conservative hold		Swing		

Ewhurst and Sedlescombe
Party	Candidate	Votes	%	±%
Conservative	Tony Ganly	1,131	75.7	−1.9
Liberal Democrats	Angus Gilloughley	363	24.3	+1.9
Majority		768	51.4	−3.8
Turnout		1,494	72.5	+20.9
Conservative hold		Swing		

Marsham (2 seats)
Party	Candidate	Votes	%	±%
Conservative	Roger Bird	1,421		
Conservative	Christopher Saint	1,271		
Labour	Bob Ball	718		
Labour	Johnathan Lee	679		
Liberal Democrats	Derek Greenup	308		
Liberal Democrats	Gill Stone	204		
Turnout		4,601	77.5	+23.5
Conservative hold		Swing		
Conservative hold		Swing		

Rother Levels (2 seats)
Party	Candidate	Votes	%	±%
Conservative	Martin Mooney	1,566		
Conservative	Ian Jenkins	1,372		
Liberal Democrats	Susan Schlesinger	792		
UKIP	Ian Slora	750		
Turnout		4,480	74.2	+22.8
Conservative hold		Swing		
Conservative hold		Swing		

Rye (2 seats)
Party	Candidate	Votes	%	±%
Conservative	David Ampthill	1,108		
Conservative	Gennette Stevens	1,019		
Labour	Sam Souster	886		
Labour	Ray Prewer	656		
Liberal Democrats	Sonia Holmes	377		
Turnout		4,046	68.0	+17.8
Conservative hold		Swing		
Conservative gain from Labour		Swing		

Salehurst (2 seats)
Party	Candidate	Votes	%	±%
Liberal Democrats	Sue Prochak	1,318		
Conservative	Graham Browne	1,184		
Liberal Democrats	Stephen Hardy	1,063		
Conservative	Gaynor Gough	850		
Labour	Bob Collins	251		
Turnout		4,666	72.9	+21.9
Liberal Democrats hold		Swing		
Conservative hold		Swing		

Ticehurst and Etchingham (2 seats)
Party	Candidate	Votes	%	±%
Conservative	Robert Elliston	1,560		
Conservative	Mary Barnes	1,541		
Liberal Democrats	George Hearn	571		
Green	Don Nicholls	535		
Turnout		4,207	73.5	+23.3
Conservative hold		Swing		
Conservative hold		Swing		

== By-elections between 2015 and 2019 ==
=== Battle Town by-election ===
A by-election was held in Battle Town on 16 July 2015 after the resignation of Conservative councillor Martin Noakes due to ill health. The seat was gained for the Liberal Democrats by Kevin Dixon with a 409-vote majority over Conservative Hazel Sharman.

Battle Town by-election 16 July 2015
Party	Candidate	Votes	%	±%
Liberal Democrats	Kevin Dixon	751	57.8	+10.8
Conservative	Hazel Sharman	342	26.3	−11.8
UKIP	Tony Smith	107	8.2	+8.2
Labour	Timothy MacPherson	100	7.7	−7.2
Majority		409	31.5	
Turnout		1,300	32.4	−37.5
Liberal Democrats gain from Conservative		Swing		

=== Collington by-election ===
A by-election was held in Collington on 27 October 2016 after the resignation of independent councillor Tony Mansi for health reasons. The seat was won by independent candidate Deirdre Earl-Williams.

Collington by-election 27 October 2016
Party	Candidate	Votes	%	±%
Independent	Deirdre Earl-Williams	818	60.0	+60.0
Conservative	Andrew Burton	393	28.8	−1.0
Labour	Sara Watson	87	6.4	−2.2
UKIP	Michael Phillips	66	4.8	−8.0
Majority		425	31.2	
Turnout		1,364		
Independent hold		Swing		

=== Darwell by-election ===
A by-election was held in Darwell on 27 October 2016 after the resignation of Conservative councillor Emily Rowlinson. The seat was won by Conservative candidate John Barnes.

Darwell by-election 27 October 2016
Party	Candidate	Votes	%	±%
Conservative	John Barnes	359	43.5	+1.9
Liberal Democrats	Mary Varrall	259	31.4	+14.9
Labour	Antonia Berelson	79	9.6	−0.6
Green	Andrew Wedmore	69	8.4	−6.5
UKIP	Edward Smith	60	7.3	−9.5
Majority		100	12.1	
Turnout		826		
Conservative hold		Swing		

=== St Marks by-election ===
A by-election was held in St Marks on 10 January 2019 after the death of independent councillor Stuart Earl. The seat was won by independent candidate Kathy Harmer.

St Marks by-election 10 January 2019
Party	Candidate	Votes	%	±%
Independent	Kathy Harmer	1,000	60.7	+60.7
Conservative	Gino Forte	521	31.6	−2.3
Labour	John Walker	79	4.8	−4.6
UKIP	John Zipser	48	2.9	−15.1
Majority		479	29.1	
Turnout		1,648		
Independent hold		Swing		
