= 1999 Rother District Council election =

1999 UK local government election

The 1999 Rother District Council election took place on 6 May 1999 to elect members of Rother District Council in East Sussex, England. The whole council was up for election and the Conservative Party gained overall control of the council from no overall control.

== Background ==
Before the election both the Conservatives and Liberal Democrats had 16 councillors, while there were 8 independents and 5 from the Labour Party. Among the councillors who stood down at the election were the independent councillors, Clifford Jordan and George Shackleton, from Rye and Liberal Democrat Jill Theis of Crowhurst and Catsfield ward.

The Conservatives won all 3 seats in Bexhill Collington ward without opposition.

== Election result ==
Rother local election result 1999
Party	Seats	Gains	Losses	Net gain/loss	Seats %	Votes %	Votes	+/−
Conservative	28			+12	62.2			
Liberal Democrats	8			-8	17.8			
Labour	5			0	11.1			
Independent	4			-4	8.9			

== By-elections between 1999 and 2003 ==
=== Bexhill Central ===
Bexhill Central by-election 7 June 2001
Party	Candidate	Votes	%	±%
Conservative		934	43.3	−11.9
Liberal Democrats		739	34.2	−10.6
Labour		486	22.5	+22.5
Majority		195	9.1	
Turnout		2,159		
Conservative hold		Swing		

=== Bexhill St Mark's ===
A by-election was held in Bexhill St Marks on 7 June 2001 after the death of Conservative councillor and leader of Rother council Ivor Brampton.

Bexhill St Mark's by-election 7 June 2001
Party	Candidate	Votes	%	±%
Conservative		2,110	63.2	+16.1
Liberal Democrats		779	23.3	+1.1
Labour		452	13.5	−17.2
Majority		1,331	39.9	
Turnout		3,341		
Conservative hold		Swing		

=== Fairlight ===
A by-election was held in Fairlight on 1 November 2001 after the Conservative councillor S. Ashworth resigned her seat. It was held for the Conservatives by Roger Bird with a majority of 213 votes.

Fairlight by-election 1 November 2001
Party	Candidate	Votes	%	±%
Conservative	Roger Bird	437	66.1	+8.2
Independent	Alwyn Lutman	224	33.9	+33.9
Majority		213	32.2	
Turnout		661	44.2	
Conservative hold		Swing		

=== Old Town ===
Old Town by-election 17 October 2002
Party	Candidate	Votes	%	±%
Liberal Democrats	James Wood	369	48.6	+13.6
Labour	Keith Bridger	197	25.9	−9.7
Conservative	Peter Botting	194	25.5	+0.0
Majority		172	22.7	
Turnout		760	24.1	
Liberal Democrats hold		Swing		
