= Bexhill Town Hall =

Municipal building in Bexhill, East Sussex, England

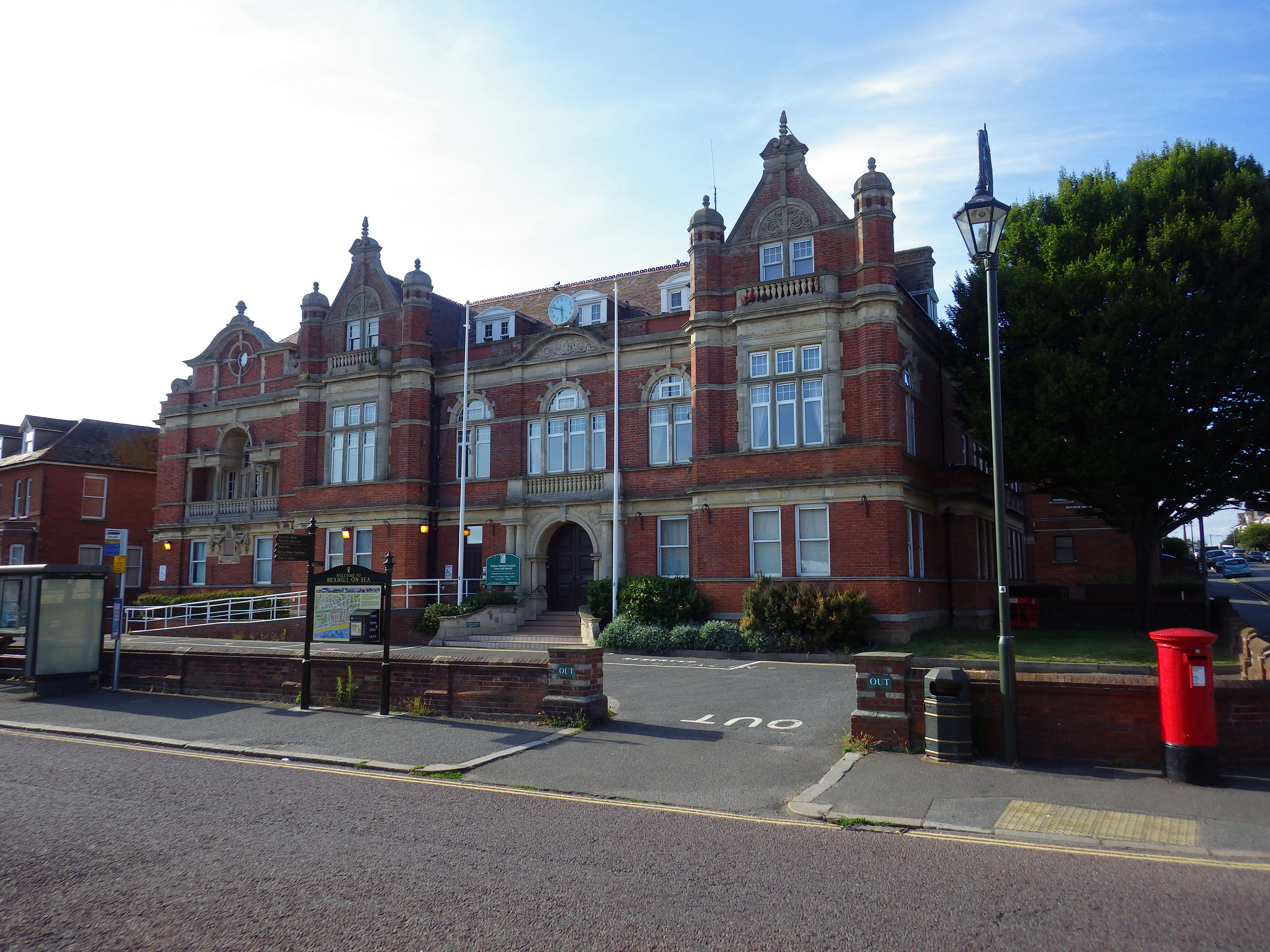
- Bexhill Town Hall

- Shown in East Sussex
- 50.8417°N 0.4710°E
- Location: London Road, Bexhill-on-Sea

History
- Built: 1895

Site notes
- Architect: Henry Ward
- Architectural style: Renaissance style

Listed Building – Grade II
- Official name: Bexhill Town Hall
- Designated: 18 November 2022
- Reference no.: 1483735

Bexhill Town Hall is a municipal building in the London Road, Bexhill-on-Sea, East Sussex, England. The town hall, which is the headquarters of Rother District Council, is a Grade II listed building.

== History ==
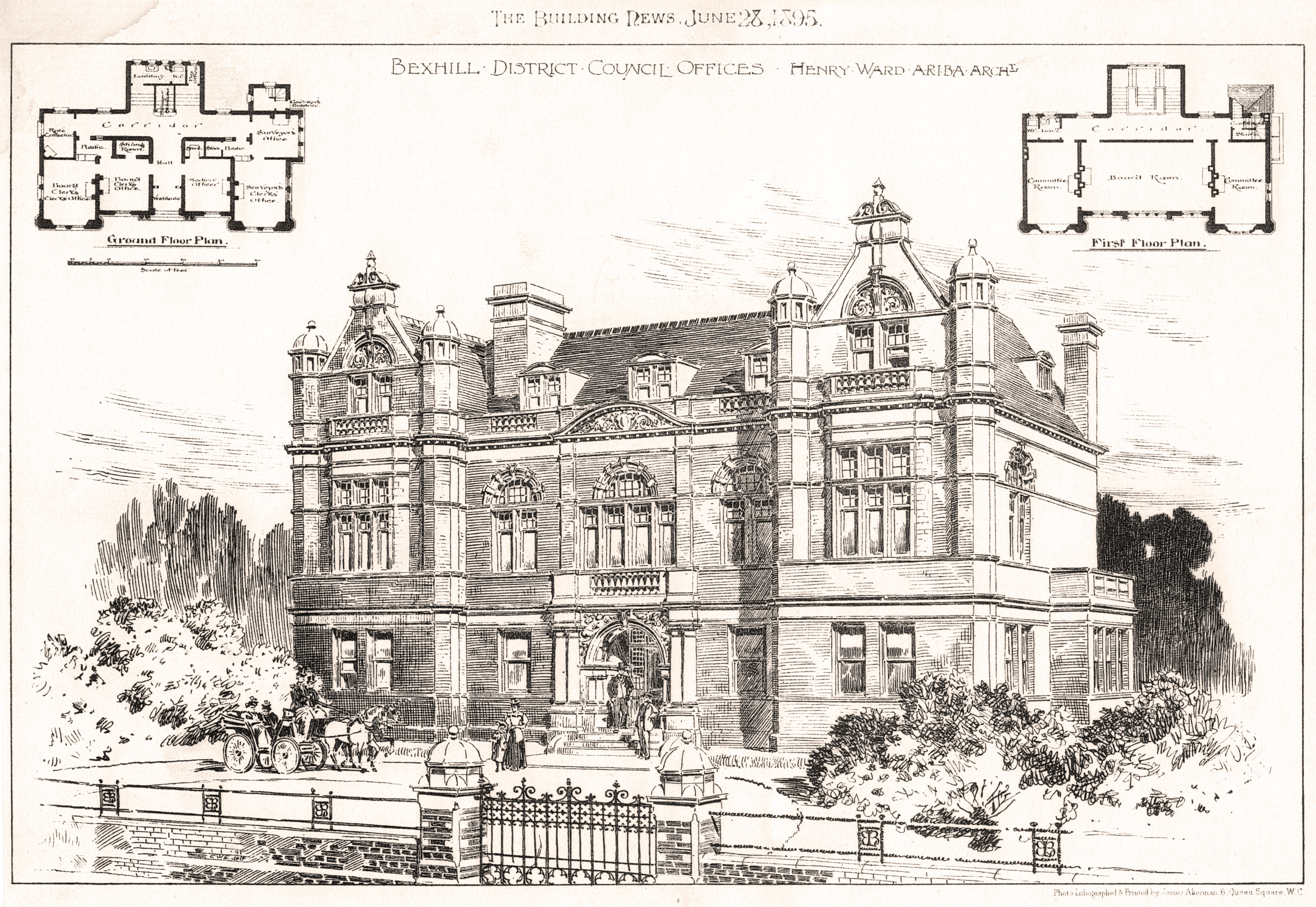
The Building News journal, 1895

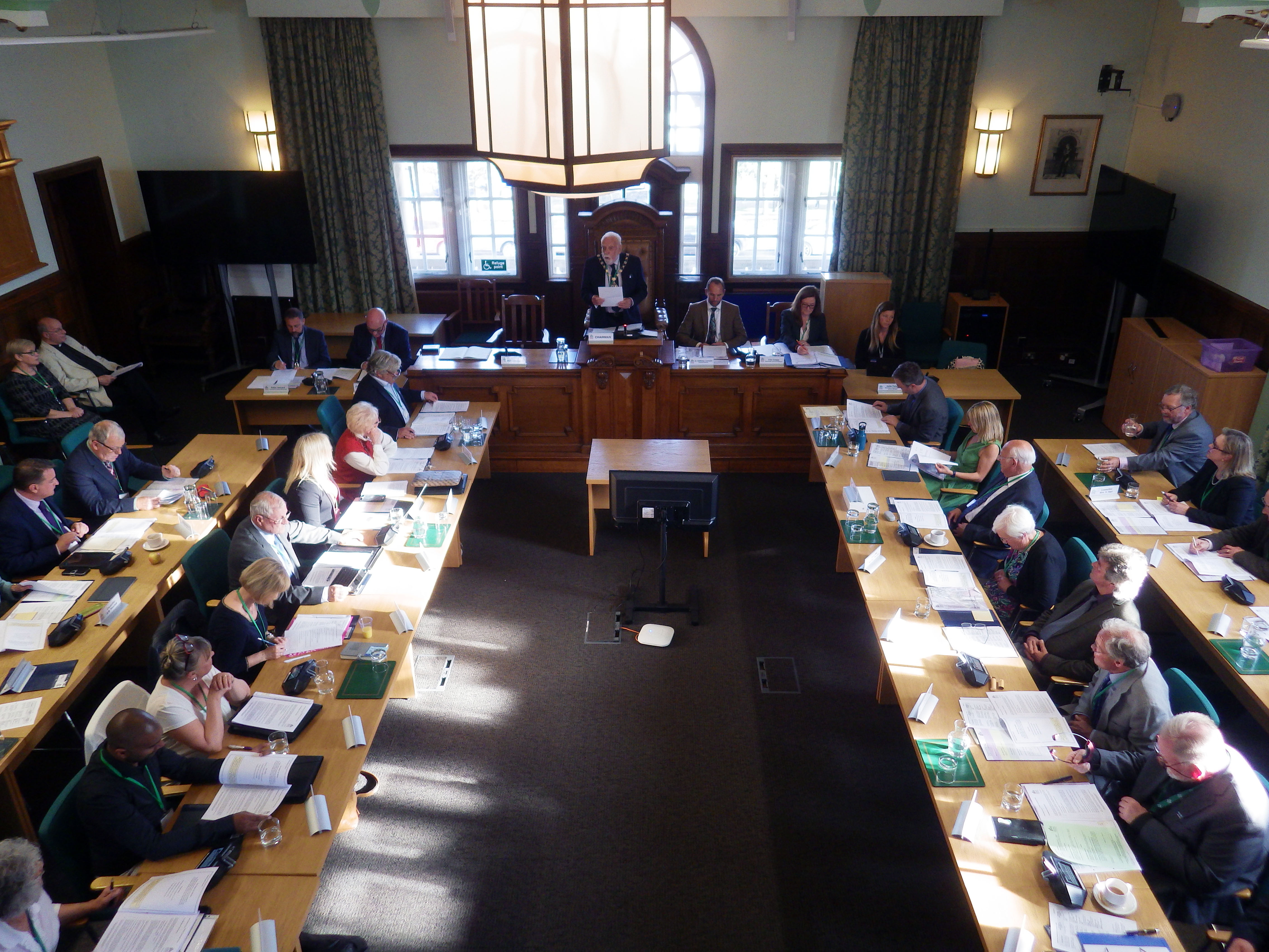
The council chamber in the town hall

The local board of health, which was established in July 1884, initially met in the Bell Hotel in Church Street before using a room at Dorset Cottage in Hastings Road from May 1885 and then a room at the Bexhill Institute in Station Road from 1893. After finding this arrangement unsuitable, the local board decided to procure a purpose-built town hall: the site they selected was occupied by two residential properties which had formed part of the estate of the 7th Earl De La Warr, whose family seat was at Buckhurst Park. The earl made the site available to the local board as a gift. Following significant population growth, largely associated with seaside tourism, the town became an urban district, giving added urgency to the procurement of a town hall, in 1894.

Construction of the new building began in spring 1894. It was designed by Henry Ward in the Renaissance style, built by a local contractor, Charles Thomas, in red brick with stone dressings at a cost of £5,250 and was officially opened by the Lord Mayor of London, Sir Joseph Renals, on 27 April 1895. The design involved a symmetrical main frontage with five bays facing onto London Road with the end bays gabled and slightly projected forward; the central section of three bays featured a rounded headed doorway with a stone surround which was flanked by pairs of Doric order columns supporting a balustrade: there was a mullioned window with a Diocletian window above on the first floor and a curved pediment with a carving in the tympanum at roof level. Internally, the principal room was the council chamber.

A memorial to the first chairman of the local board, Lieutenant Colonel Henry Lane, which took the form of a drinking fountain, was unveiled by his widow, Ellen Lane, in front of the town hall on 25 June 1898. The 8th Earl De La Warr, who had inherited the earldom on the death of his father, worked as a war correspondent in South Africa during the Second Boer War: following his safe return, a reception was held in his honour at the town hall in July 1900. The town went on to become a municipal borough with the town hall as its headquarters in May 1902. The foundation stone for an extension to the west, which accommodated an enlarged council chamber, was laid by Lord Buckhurst on 16 March 1908. In July 1925 the borough council acquired the house to the immediate west of the town hall for expansion and, in summer 1937, the complex was extended along Amherst Road. The town hall was damaged during an air raid in September 1940 during the Second World War. In 1960 the borough council acquired another house to the west of the town hall for the use of council officers and their departments.

The town hall continued to serve as the borough headquarters for much of the 20th century and remained the local seat of government when the enlarged Rother District Council was formed in 1974. In February 2021, civic leaders gave their approval to proposals which could ultimately lead to a major refurbishment of the complex.
