= Helena Dollimore =

British Labour MP for Hastings and Rye

Helena Dollimore MP
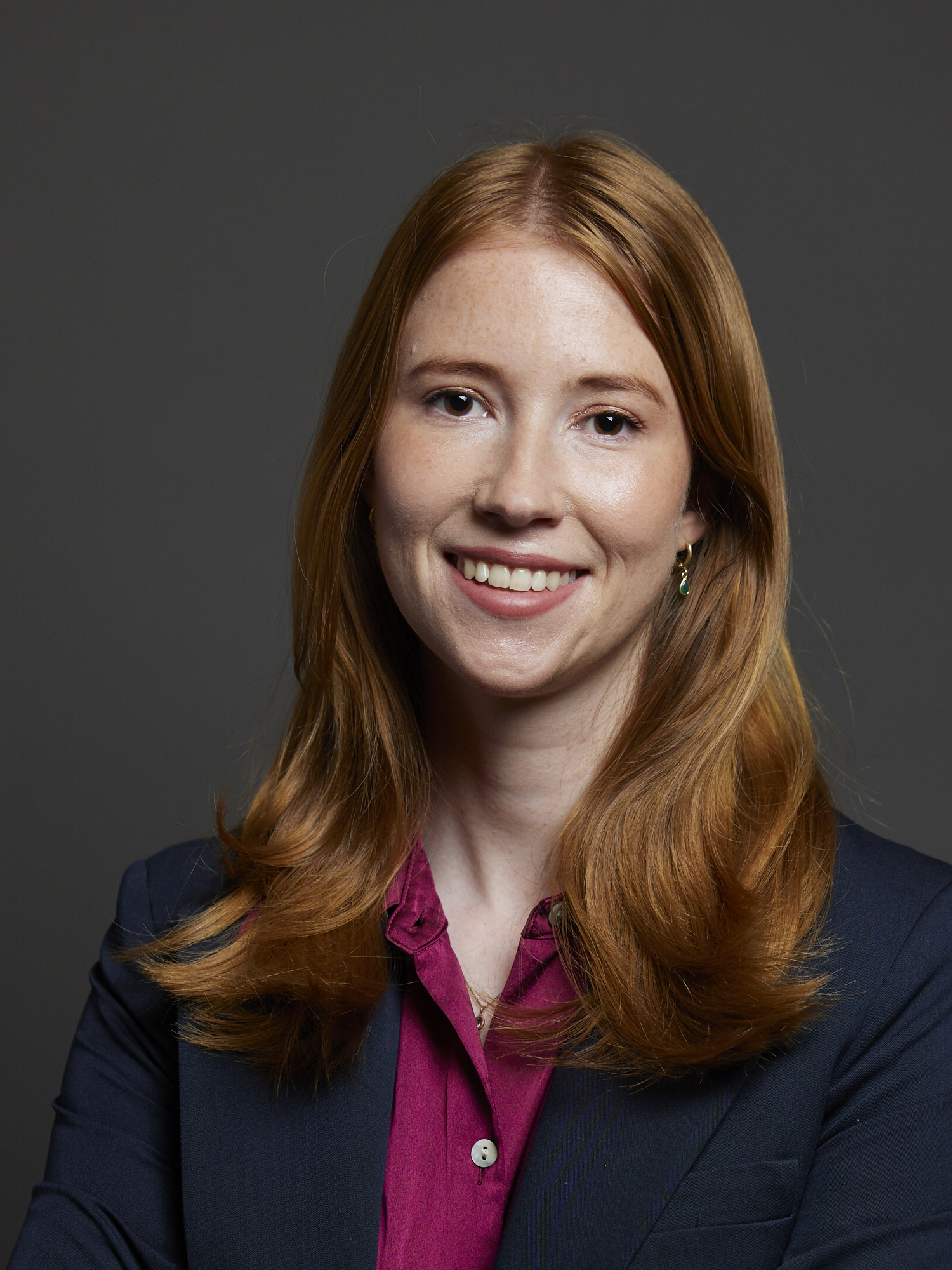
- Official portrait, 2024

Member of Parliament for Hastings and Rye
- Incumbent
- Assumed office 4 July 2024
- Preceded by: Sally-Ann Hart
- Majority: 8,653 (18.8%)

Merton London Borough Councillor for St Helier
- In office 6 May 2021 – 30 May 2024
- Preceded by: Kelly Braund
- Succeeded by: Shuile Syeda

Personal details
- Born: Helena Dollimore; 1994 (age 31–32) Brighton, England
- Party: Labour Co-op
- Education: St Hilda’s College, Oxford (BA)

Helena Dollimore (born 1994) is a British Labour and Co-operative politician who has been the Member of Parliament (MP) for Hastings and Rye since the 2024 general election.

== Education and early career ==
Born and brought up in East Sussex, Dollimore attended Heathfield Community College. At age 17, she gave a speech at the 2011 Labour Party Conference. She attended St Hilda's College, Oxford and was the chair of the Oxford University Labour Club.

After university, Dollimore worked for Save the Children. From 2020 Dollimore worked as a senior manager at Unilever.

During the COVID-19 pandemic, Dollimore trained as a vaccinator with the St John Ambulance, volunteering at a pharmacy in Hastings.

Dollimore is an Army Reservist.

== Political career ==
Dollimore was a councillor for the St Helier ward in the London Borough of Merton between 2021 and 2024. In 2024, after the general election was called, she resigned her council seat in order to stand as the Labour parliamentary candidate for the Hastings and Rye constituency, and was subsequently elected as the MP for the seat.

In September 2024 Dollimore was elected to the Environment, Food and Rural Affairs Select Committee.

In November 2025, she was appointed Parliamentary private secretary for the Treasury.

Dollimore has campaigned for improvements to the A21 road, which is mostly an unimproved single carriageway from Royal Tunbridge Wells to Hastings.

Parliament of the United Kingdom
Preceded by Sally-Ann Hart	Member of Parliament for Hastings and Rye; 2024–present	Incumbent
