= 2011 Rother District Council election =

2011 UK local government election

Map of the results of the 2011 Rother District Council election. Conservatives in blue, Liberal Democrats in yellow, independents in light grey and Labour in red.

The 2011 Rother District Council election took place on 5 May 2011 to elect members of Rother District Council in East Sussex, England. The whole council was up for election and the Conservative Party stayed in overall control of the council.

== Election result ==
The Conservatives stayed in control of the council with a slightly reduced majority after having a net loss of 1 seat to leave them on 27 councillors. They lost 1 seat to Labour in Bexhill Sidley and 3 seats to independents, with all 4 independents who stood for seats in Bexhill being elected. However the Conservatives picked up a seat in Darwell, after independent councillor Wendy Mier stood down at the election, and gained 2 seats from the Liberal Democrats in Salehurst and Bexhill St Michaels.

The Liberal Democrats also lost a seat to Labour in Rye and as a result dropped from 8 to 5 seats on the council. Meanwhile, the Labour gains in Rye and Bexhill Sidley meant the party regained a presence on the council with 2 councillors. Overall turnout at the election was 48.2%, which was described as "exceptionally good" by the returning officer.

Rother local election result 2011
Party	Seats	Gains	Losses	Net gain/loss	Seats %	Votes %	Votes	+/−
Conservative	27	3	4	-1	71.1	53.2	30,664	-6.5%
Liberal Democrats	5	0	3	-3	13.2	21.0	12,081	-6.2%
Independent	4	3	1	+2	10.5	8.4	4,815	+2.4%
Labour	2	2	0	+2	5.3	15.8	9,110	+9.2%
Green	0	0	0	0	0	1.6	915	+1.1%

== Ward results ==
Battle Town (2 seats)
Party	Candidate	Votes	%	±%
Liberal Democrats	Kathryn Field	960		
Liberal Democrats	Kevin Dixon	778		
Conservative	Margaret Howell	640		
Conservative	Norma Lansdowne	529		
Labour	Richard Body	276		
Green	Andrew Ratcliffe	261		
Turnout		3,444	48.0	+5.4
Liberal Democrats hold		Swing		
Liberal Democrats hold		Swing		

Bexhill Central (2 seats)
Party	Candidate	Votes	%	±%
Conservative	Joy Hughes	674		
Conservative	Richard Carroll	666		
Labour	Suze Youde	531		
Labour	Paul Theaker	482		
Liberal Democrats	Neil Francis	347		
Turnout		2,700	37.7	+4.0
Conservative hold		Swing		
Conservative hold		Swing		

Bexhill Collington (2 seats)
Party	Candidate	Votes	%	±%
Independent	John Lee	1,096		
Independent	Tony Mansi	1,034		
Conservative	Gillian Wheeler	871		
Conservative	Shirley Miller	819		
Labour	Kate Bird	239		
Turnout		4,059	57.5	+13.1
Independent gain from Conservative		Swing		
Independent gain from Conservative		Swing		

Bexhill Kewhurst (2 seats)
Party	Candidate	Votes	%	±%
Conservative	Brian Kentfield	1,244		
Conservative	Martin Kenward	1,132		
Liberal Democrats	John Zipperlen	575		
Labour	Yvonne Cleland	426		
Turnout		3,377	51.7	+9.4
Conservative hold		Swing		
Conservative hold		Swing		

Bexhill Old Town (2 seats)
Party	Candidate	Votes	%	±%
Liberal Democrats	Frances Winterborn	539		
Liberal Democrats	Stuart Wood	511		
Conservative	Gaynor Gough	502		
Labour	Alan Bearne	287		
Turnout		1,839	42.7	+5.4
Liberal Democrats hold		Swing		
Liberal Democrats hold		Swing		

Bexhill Sackville (2 seats)
Party	Candidate	Votes	%	±%
Conservative	Deirdre Williams	750		
Conservative	Patrick Douart	727		
Liberal Democrats	Vivienne Bond	581		
Liberal Democrats	Toby Cook	520		
Labour	Russell Meredith	337		
Turnout		2,915	45.9	+5.0
Conservative hold		Swing		
Conservative hold		Swing		

Bexhill Sidley (2 seats)
Party	Candidate	Votes	%	±%
Conservative	Jim Carroll	825		
Labour	Maurice Watson	624		
Labour	Andrew Fleming	619		
Conservative	Abul Azad	596		
Turnout		2,664	39.0	
Conservative hold		Swing		
Labour gain from Conservative		Swing		

Bexhill St Marks (2 seats)
Party	Candidate	Votes	%	±%
Independent	Stuart Earl	1,005		
Conservative	Joanne Gadd	980		
Conservative	Robert Chase	837		
Liberal Democrats	Rachel Hills	494		
Labour	Andrew Shepherd	213		
Turnout		3,529	54.7	+10.0
Independent gain from Conservative		Swing		
Conservative hold		Swing		

Bexhill St Michaels (2 seats)
Party	Candidate	Votes	%	±%
Independent	Charles Clark	996		
Conservative	Simon Elford	540		
Liberal Democrats	Martyn Forster	480		
Labour	Philipa Coughlan	344		
Turnout		2,360	42.5	+6.3
Independent hold		Swing		
Conservative gain from Liberal Democrats		Swing		

Bexhill St Stephens (2 seats)
Party	Candidate	Votes	%	±%
Conservative	Bridget George	830		
Conservative	Paul Lendon	796		
Labour	Paul Courtel	465		
Liberal Democrats	Barbara Warburton	445		
Turnout		2,536	41.2	+4.9
Conservative hold		Swing		
Conservative hold		Swing		

Brede Valley (2 seats)
Party	Candidate	Votes	%	±%
Conservative	Jonathan Johnson	1,173		
Conservative	Carl Maynard	1,117		
Labour	Margaret	439		
Labour	Linda Harland	429		
Liberal Democrats	John Smith	295		
Turnout		3,453	48.9	+8.3
Conservative hold		Swing		
Conservative hold		Swing		

Crowhurst
Party	Candidate	Votes	%	±%
Conservative	Angharad Davies	549	51.7	+5.4
Liberal Democrats	John Kemp	394	37.1	−9.0
Labour	Tim MacPherson	119	11.2	+3.5
Majority		155	14.6	+14.4
Turnout		1,062	52.6	
Conservative hold		Swing		

Darwell (2 seats)
Party	Candidate	Votes	%	±%
Conservative	David Vereker	1,168		
Conservative	Bob White	1,016		
Green	Andrew Wedmore	386		
Liberal Democrats	Tracy Dixon	363		
Liberal Democrats	Thomas Sayer	341		
Labour	Brian Basham	228		
Turnout		3,502	48.7	+6.7
Conservative hold		Swing		
Conservative gain from Independent		Swing		

Eastern Rother (2 seats)
Party	Candidate	Votes	%	±%
Conservative	Paul Osborne	1,083		
Conservative	Nick Ramus	1,039		
Labour	Chris Mears	564		
Labour	Nick Warren	510		
Liberal Democrats	Nicholas Cleveland-Stephens	237		
Turnout		3,433	49.8	+5.6
Conservative hold		Swing		
Conservative hold		Swing		

Ewhurst and Sedlescombe
Party	Candidate	Votes	%	±%
Conservative	Tony Ganly	790	77.6	+11.2
Liberal Democrats	Angus Gillougley	228	22.4	−11.2
Majority		562	55.2	+22.3
Turnout		1,018	51.6	+2.1
Conservative hold		Swing		

Marsham (2 seats)
Party	Candidate	Votes	%	±%
Conservative	Roger Bird	1,206		
Conservative	Robin Patten	1,165		
Labour	Bob Ball	377		
Labour	Jonathan Lee	334		
Liberal Democrats	Derek Greenup	247		
Turnout		3,329	54.0	+8.5
Conservative hold		Swing		
Conservative hold		Swing		

Rother Levels (2 seats)
Party	Candidate	Votes	%	±%
Conservative	Martin Mooney	1,219		
Conservative	Ian Jenkins	1,154		
Liberal Democrats	Jennifer Als	533		
Liberal Democrats	Susan Schlesinger	495		
Turnout		3,401	51.4	+8.3
Conservative hold		Swing		
Conservative hold		Swing		

Rye (2 seats)
Party	Candidate	Votes	%	±%
Conservative	David Russell	620		
Labour	Sam Souster	577		
Labour	Nigel Jennings	488		
Independent	Mary Smith	470		
Conservative	Christopher Saint	459		
Liberal Democrats	Sonia Holmes	280		
Independent	David Wright	214		
Turnout		3,108	50.2	+6.5
Conservative hold		Swing		
Labour gain from Liberal Democrats		Swing		

Salehurst (2 seats)
Party	Candidate	Votes	%	±%
Liberal Democrats	Susan Prochak	958		
Conservative	Graham Browne	838		
Liberal Democrats	Stephen Hardy	711		
Labour	Bob Collins	202		
Turnout		2,709	51.0	+5.2
Liberal Democrats hold		Swing		
Conservative gain from Liberal Democrats		Swing		

Ticehurst and Etchingham (2 seats)
Party	Candidate	Votes	%	±%
Conservative	Robert Elliston	1,060		
Conservative	Mary Barnes	1,050		
Liberal Democrats	Peggy Langdown	403		
Liberal Democrats	Gavin Barrass	366		
Green	Don Nicholls	268		
Turnout		3,147	50.2	+9.1
Conservative hold		Swing		
Conservative hold		Swing		

== By-elections between 2011 and 2015 ==
A by-election was held in Darwell on 31 July 2014 after the resignation of Conservative councillor Bob White. The seat was held for the Conservatives by Eleanor Kirby-Green with a majority of 179 votes over the UK Independence Party.

Darwell by-election 31 July 2014
Party	Candidate	Votes	%	±%
Conservative	Eleanor Kirby-Green	361	42.7	−11.8
UKIP	Edward Smith	182	21.5	+21.5
Green	Andrew Wedmore	154	18.2	+0.2
Labour	Suz Evasdaughter	84	9.9	−0.7
Liberal Democrats	Tracy Dixon	65	7.7	−9.2
Majority		179	21.2	
Turnout		846	20.7	−28.0
Conservative hold		Swing		
