= 2003 Rother District Council election =

2003 UK local government election

Map of the results of the 2003 Rother District Council election. Conservatives in blue, Liberal Democrats in yellow, Labour in red and independents in light grey.

The 2003 Rother District Council election took place on 1 May 2003 to elect members of Rother District Council in East Sussex, England. The whole council was up for election after boundary changes reduced the number of seats by 7. The Conservative Party stayed in overall control of the council.

== Background ==
Originally a total of 81 candidates stood for the 37 seats that were to be elected after the boundary changes, comprising 37 Conservatives, 32 Liberal Democrats, 12 Labour and 3 independents. However the death of a Liberal Democrat candidate for Rother Levels meant the election in that ward was delayed until 12 June and so 75 candidates stood for the 35 seats that were contested on 1 May.

Both the Conservative leader of East Sussex County Council, Peter Jones, and the leader of the Liberal Democrat group on Rother District Council, Stephen Hardy, stood down from the council at the election.

== Election result ==
The Conservatives continued to hold a strong majority on the council winning 13 of the 18 seats in Bexhill, compared to 2 each for the Liberal Democrat and Labour parties, and 1 independent. In the remaining rural areas of the council that were elected on 1 May, 9 Conservatives, 6 Liberal Democrats, 1 Labour and 1 independent councillors were elected.

The delayed election in Rother Levels on 12 June had the Conservatives win both seats.

Rother local election result 2003
Party	Seats	Gains	Losses	Net gain/loss	Seats %	Votes %	Votes	+/−
Conservative	25			-4	65.8	57.5	25,184	
Liberal Democrats	8			0	21.1	30.2	13,205	
Labour	3			-1	7.9	8.0	3,497	
Independent	2			-2	5.3	4.3	1,883	

The above totals include the delayed election in Rother Levels on 12 June 2003.

== Ward results ==
Battle Town (2 seats)
Party	Candidate	Votes	%	±%
Liberal Democrats	Suzanne Williams	668		
Liberal Democrats	Robert White	664		
Conservative	Margaret Leicester	599		
Conservative	Anthony Mitchell	560		
Labour	John Gately	182		
Turnout		2,673	37.3	

Bexhill Central (2 seats)
Party	Candidate	Votes	%	±%
Conservative	Eveline Armstrong	634		
Conservative	Joyce Hughes	608		
Liberal Democrats	Neil Francis	484		
Liberal Democrats	Michael Doncaster	451		
Turnout		2,177	32.0	

Bexhill Collington (2 seats)
Party	Candidate	Votes	%	±%
Conservative	Ronald Dyason	1,071		
Conservative	Christopher Starnes	974		
Liberal Democrats	Heather Morrey	575		
Turnout		2,620	43.2	

Bexhill Kewhurst (2 seats)
Party	Candidate	Votes	%	±%
Conservative	Brian Kentfield	1,199		
Conservative	Martin Horscroft	1,180		
Liberal Democrats	John Zipperlen	162		
Turnout		2,541	41.7	

Bexhill Old Town (2 seats)
Party	Candidate	Votes	%	±%
Liberal Democrats	James Wood	499		
Liberal Democrats	Eric Armstrong	469		
Conservative	Paul Lendon	373		
Labour	Nicholas Hollington	195		
Turnout		1,536	32.3	

Bexhill Sackville (2 seats)
Party	Candidate	Votes	%	±%
Conservative	Jean Hopkinson	876		
Conservative	Deidre Williams	775		
Liberal Democrats	Christopher Storer	411		
Turnout		2,062	33.6	

Bexhill Sidley (2 seats)
Party	Candidate	Votes	%	±%
Labour	Helen Bridger	446		
Labour	Keith Bridger	418		
Conservative	Robert Wheeler	399		
Conservative	Irena Massarella	395		
Liberal Democrats	Matthew Kemp	205		
Turnout		1,863	28.7	

Bexhill St. Marks (2 seats)
Party	Candidate	Votes	%	±%
Conservative	Stuart Earl	1,236		
Conservative	Joanne Gadd	1,106		
Liberal Democrats	Stephen Callandine-Evans	359		
Turnout		2,701	41.6	

Bexhill St. Michaels (2 seats)
Party	Candidate	Votes	%	±%
Independent	Charles Clark	631		
Conservative	Peter Fairhurst	393		
Conservative	Martin Kenward	373		
Liberal Democrats	Martyn Forster	346		
Turnout		1,743	30.6	

Bexhill St. Stephens (2 seats)
Party	Candidate	Votes	%	±%
Conservative	Graham Gubby	648		
Conservative	William Clements	631		
Liberal Democrats	Hilary McCorry	432		
Liberal Democrats	Trevor Smith	339		
Labour	Dominic Coughlan	235		
Turnout		2,285	38.8	

Brede Valley (2 seats)
Party	Candidate	Votes	%	±%
Conservative	Richard Carroll	775		
Conservative	Carl Maynard	750		
Liberal Democrats	Rowan Fookes	647		
Turnout		2,172	38.0	

Crowhurst
Party	Candidate	Votes	%	±%
Liberal Democrats	John Kemp	486	55.5	
Conservative	Ian Tomisson	315	36.0	
Labour	Timothy MacPherson	74	8.5	
Majority		171	19.5	
Turnout		875	43.4	

Darwell (2 seats)
Party	Candidate	Votes	%	±%
Conservative	David Vereker	858		
Independent	Wendy Miers	756		
Liberal Democrats	Trevor Seeman	476		
Turnout		2,090	39.7	

Eastern Rother (2 seats)
Party	Candidate	Votes	%	±%
Conservative	Keith Glazier	733		
Conservative	Charles Ramus	707		
Liberal Democrats	Sonia Holmes	427		
Liberal Democrats	Nicholas Cleveland-Stevens	349		
Labour	Paul Carey	311		
Labour	Keith Pike	223		
Turnout		2,750	40.1	

Ewhurst and Sedlescombe
Party	Candidate	Votes	%	±%
Conservative	Matthew Wilson	602	67.5	
Liberal Democrats	Jeremy Field	290	32.5	
Majority		312	35.0	
Turnout		892	46.6	

Marsham (2 seats)
Party	Candidate	Votes	%	±%
Conservative	Robin Patten	935		
Conservative	Roger Bird	894		
Independent	Hugh Gallagher	496		
Liberal Democrats	Joloyn Holden	285		
Labour	Paola Dorigato	138		
Labour	Shirley Wheeldon	132		
Turnout		2,880	48.4	

Rye (2 seats)
Party	Candidate	Votes	%	±%
Labour	Samuel Souster	542		
Liberal Democrats	Granville Bantick	537		
Conservative	David Russell	474		
Conservative	Anthony Arfwedson	448		
Labour	Geoffrey Lyus	443		
Turnout		2,444	44.3	

Salehurst (2 seats)
Party	Candidate	Votes	%	±%
Liberal Democrats	Susan Prochak	894		
Liberal Democrats	George Hearn	828		
Conservative	Mary Barnes	495		
Conservative	Geoffrey Goodsell	485		
Turnout		2,702	42.7	

Ticehurst and Etchingham (2 seats)
Party	Candidate	Votes	%	±%
Conservative	Ian Jenkins	663		
Conservative	John Potter	633		
Liberal Democrats	Albert Barrass	542		
Liberal Democrats	Mary Varrall	542		
Turnout		2,380	38.6	

=== Rother Levels delayed election ===
The election in Rother Levels was delayed until 12 June 2003 after the death of a Liberal Democrat candidate Julian Emery.

Rother Levels (2 seats)
Party	Candidate	Votes	%	±%
Conservative	Martin Mooney	702		
Conservative	Ronald Parren	685		
Liberal Democrats	Jennifer Als	466		
Liberal Democrats	Alan Coote	372		
Labour	Linda Whymark	93		
Labour	Jean Parks	65		
Turnout		2,383	34.5	

== By-elections between 2003 and 2007 ==
=== Bexhill Sackville September 2004 ===
A by-election took place in Bexhill Sackville on 9 September 2004 after the resignation of Conservative councillor Jean Hopkinson when she moved to New Zealand. The seat was held for the Conservatives by Graham Oliver with a majority of 184 votes over the Liberal Democrats.

Bexhill Sackville by-election 9 September 2004
Party	Candidate	Votes	%	±%
Conservative	Graham Oliver	468	51.7	−16.4
Liberal Democrats	Neil Francis	284	31.3	−0.6
UKIP	Dorothy Thomson	154	17.0	+17.0
Majority		184	20.3	
Turnout		906	25.1	−8.5
Conservative hold		Swing		

=== Bexhill St Stephens ===
A by-election was held in Bexhill St Stephens on 29 September 2005 after the death of Conservative councillor William Clements. The seat was held for the Conservatives by Paul Lendon by a majority of 111 votes over the Liberal Democrats.

Bexhill St Stephens by-election 29 September 2005
Party	Candidate	Votes	%	±%
Conservative	Paul Lendon	470	46.6	−2.7
Liberal Democrats	Molly Webb	359	35.6	+2.7
Labour	Dominic Coughlan	180	17.8	−0.1
Majority		111	11.0	
Turnout		1,009	30.2	−8.6
Conservative hold		Swing		

=== Ticehurst and Etchingham ===
A by-election was held in Ticehurst and Etchingham on 17 November 2005 after Conservative councillor John Potter moved away. The seat was held for the Conservatives by Robert Elliston with a majority of 367 votes over the Liberal Democrats.

Ticehurst and Etchingham by-election 17 November 2005
Party	Candidate	Votes	%	±%
Conservative	Robert Elliston	696	67.9	+12.9
Liberal Democrats	Mary Varrall	329	32.1	−12.9
Majority		367	35.8	
Turnout		1,025	30.8	−7.8
Conservative hold		Swing		

=== Bexhill Kewhurst ===
A by-election was held in Bexhill Kewhurst on 4 May 2006 after Conservative councillor Martin Horscroft resigned from the council. The seat was held for the Conservatives by Martin Kenward with a majority of 616 votes over the Liberal Democrats.

Bexhill Kewhurst by-election 4 May 2006
Party	Candidate	Votes	%	±%
Conservative	Martin Kenward	1,141	64.6	−23.5
Liberal Democrats	John Zipperlen	525	29.7	+17.8
Labour	Abdulla Khan	99	5.6	+5.6
Majority		616	34.9	
Turnout		1,765	44	+2
Conservative hold		Swing		

=== Bexhill Sackville May 2006 ===
A by-election was held in Bexhill Sackville on 4 May 2006 after Conservative councillor Graham Oliver resigned from the council. The seat was held for the Conservatives by Keith Standring with a majority of 89 votes over the Liberal Democrats.

Bexhill Sackville by-election 4 May 2006
Party	Candidate	Votes	%	±%
Conservative	Keith Standring	655	48.3	−3.4
Liberal Democrats	Martyn Forster	566	41.8	+10.5
Labour	Philipa Coughlan	134	9.9	+9.9
Majority		89	6.6	−13.7
Turnout		1,355	38	+13
Conservative hold		Swing		

=== Bexhill St Marks ===
A by-election was held in Bexhill St Marks on 4 May 2006 after Conservative councillor Stuart Earl resigned from the council. The seat was held for the Conservatives by Patrick Douart with a majority of 325 votes over the Liberal Democrats.

Bexhill St Marks by-election 4 May 2006
Party	Candidate	Votes	%	±%
Conservative	Patrick Douart	863	51.4	−26.1
Liberal Democrats	Rachel Hills	538	32.1	+6.8
UKIP	Tony Smith	185	11.0	+11.0
Labour	Stephanie Webb	92	5.5	+5.5
Majority		325	19.3	
Turnout		1,678	45	+3
Conservative hold		Swing		
