= 2019 Rother District Council election =

2019 UK local government election

- 2 May 2019

All 38 seats to Rother District Council 20 seats needed for a majority

	First party	Second party	Third party
Party	Conservative	Independent	Liberal Democrats
Last election	31 seats, 48.8%	4 seats, 12.2%	2 seats, 13.2%
Seats won	14	13	7
Seat change	▼17	▲9	▲5
Popular vote	17,610	13,074	7,398
Percentage	36.4%	27.0%	15.3%
Swing	▼12.4%	▲14.8%	▲2.1%
	Fourth party	Fifth party
Party	Labour	Green
Last election	1 seat, 15.2%	0 seats, 1.9%
Seats won	3	1
Seat change	▲2	▲1
Popular vote	6,093	2,019
Percentage	12.6%	4.2%
Swing	▼2.6%	▲2.3%
- Results of the election
Council control before election
Conservative
Council control after election
No overall control

The 2019 Rother District Council election took place on 2 May 2019 to elect members of Rother District Council in East Sussex, England.

== Summary ==
=== Election result ===
2019 Rother District Council election
Party	Candidates	Seats	Gains	Losses	Net gain/loss	Seats %	Votes %	Votes	+/−
Conservative	38	14	0	9	▼17	36.8	36.4	17,610	–12.4
Independent	16	13	6	0	▲9	34.2	27.0	13,074	+14.8
Liberal Democrats	16	7	1	0	▲5	18.4	15.3	7,398	+2.1
Labour	22	3	2	0	▲2	7.9	12.6	6,093	–2.6
Green	7	1	0	0	▲1	2.6	4.2	2,019	+2.3
UKIP	13	0	0	0	Steady	0.0	4.6	2,215	–4.1

== Ward results ==
=== Bexhill Central ===
Bexhill Central (2 seats)
Party	Candidate	Votes	%
Labour	Christine Bayliss	788	52.2
Labour	Paul Courtel	694	45.9
Conservative	Abul Azad	555	36.7
Conservative	Joy Hughes	416	27.5
UKIP	Roger Williams	226	15.0
Majority			
Turnout			
Labour gain from Conservative			
Labour gain from Conservative			

=== Bexhill Collington ===
Bexhill Collington (2 seats)
Party	Candidate	Votes	%
Independent	Deidre Earl-Williams	1,287	66.2
Independent	Doug Oliver	1,234	63.5
Conservative	Patrick Douart	318	16.4
Conservative	Maurice Watson	247	12.7
Green	John Gray	232	11.9
UKIP	Alison Phillips	134	6.9
Green	Mark Todd	132	6.8
Labour	Bob Sharkey	106	5.5
Majority			
Turnout			
Independent hold			
Independent hold			

=== Bexhill Kewhurst ===
Bexhill Kewhurst (2 seats)
Party	Candidate	Votes	%
Independent	Lynn Langlands	1,181	66.2
Independent	Brian Drayson	1,071	60.1
Conservative	Brian Kentfield	553	31.0
Conservative	Martin Kenward	388	21.8
Labour	John Walker	167	9.4
UKIP	John Dicker	151	8.5
Majority			
Turnout			
Independent gain from Conservative			
Independent gain from Conservative			

=== Bexhill Old Town & Worsham ===
Bexhill Old Town & Worsham (2 seats)
Party	Candidate	Votes	%
Green	Polly Gray	326	32.4
Independent	Chris Madeley	286	28.4
Independent	Bill Bullin	254	25.2
Liberal Democrats	Vivienne Bond	236	23.4
Conservative	Gillian Johnson	220	21.8
Conservative	Jacqueline Potts	177	17.6
UKIP	Michael Phillips	157	15.6
Labour	Richard Sage	141	14.0
Majority			
Turnout			
Green win (new seat)			
Independent win (new seat)			

=== Bexhill Pebsham & St. Michael's ===
Bexhill Pebsham & St. Michael's (2 seats)
Party	Candidate	Votes	%
Independent	Charles Clark	1,022	69.9
Independent	Jay Brewerton	738	50.5
Conservative	Barbara Clark	309	21.1
UKIP	Michael Graham	178	12.2
Conservative	Betty Waterhouse	174	11.9
Majority			
Turnout			
Independent win (new seat)			
Independent win (new seat)			

=== Bexhill Sackville ===
Bexhill Sackville (2 seats)
Party	Candidate	Votes	%
Independent	Terry Byrne	718	46.1
Independent	Hazel Timpe	694	44.6
Conservative	Ian Hollidge	484	31.1
Conservative	Robert Wheeler	409	26.3
Labour	Alan Bearne	290	18.6
UKIP	Sheila Allen-Rodgers	238	15.3
Majority			
Turnout			
Independent gain from Conservative			
Independent gain from Conservative			

=== Bexhill Sidley ===
Bexhill Sidley (2 seats)
Party	Candidate	Votes	%
Labour	Sam Coleman	498	43.5
Conservative	Jim Carroll	438	38.2
Conservative	Sharon Blagrove	382	33.3
Labour	Roger McCarthy	381	33.2
UKIP	John Zisper	285	24.9
Majority			
Turnout			
Labour hold			
Conservative hold			

=== Bexhill St. Mark's ===
Bexhill St. Mark's (2 seats)
Party	Candidate	Votes	%
Independent	Kathy Harmer	1,213	72.0
Independent	Sarah Jane Errington	1,116	66.2
Conservative	Michael Ensor	318	18.9
Conservative	Kay Maynard	243	14.4
Liberal Democrats	Wendy Dash	128	7.6
UKIP	Christine Zisper	116	6.9
Labour	Jacqueline Walker	98	5.8
Majority			
Turnout			
Independent hold			
Independent gain from Conservative			

=== Bexhill St. Stephen's ===
Bexhill St. Stephen's (2 seats)
Party	Candidate	Votes	%
Independent	Ashan Jeeawon	683	48.5
Liberal Democrats	Richard Thomas	380	27.0
Green	Dick Kempson	376	26.7
Conservative	Richard Carroll	321	22.8
Conservative	Mark Sivyer	294	20.9
UKIP	Lynn Sharp	220	15.6
Labour	Alan Watton	179	12.7
Majority			
Turnout			
Independent gain from Conservative			
Liberal Democrats gain from Conservative			

=== Brede & Udimore ===
Brede & Udimore
Party	Candidate	Votes	%
Conservative	Jonathan Johnson	303	40.0
Independent	Ian Jenkins	260	34.3
Labour	James Cakebread	78	10.3
UKIP	Wayne Andrews	59	7.8
Liberal Democrats	Derek Greenup	58	7.7
Majority			
Turnout			
Conservative win (new seat)			

=== Burwash & The Weald ===
Burwash & The Weald (2 seats)
Party	Candidate	Votes	%
Conservative	John Barnes	683	52.0
Conservative	Elanor Kirby-Green	606	46.1
Liberal Democrats	Mary Varrall	425	32.3
Green	Andrew Wedmore	369	28.1
Liberal Democrats	Laurel Lindstrom	360	27.4
Majority			
Turnout			
Conservative win (new seat)			
Conservative win (new seat)			

=== Catsfield & Crowhurst ===
Catsfield & Crowhurst
Party	Candidate	Votes	%
Conservative	Gray Curtis	280	38.4
Liberal Democrats	Tracy Dixon	198	27.2
Green	Nicky Bishop	172	23.6
UKIP	Tony Smith	79	10.8
Majority			
Turnout			
Conservative win (new seat)			

=== Eastern Rother ===
Eastern Rother (2 seats)
Party	Candidate	Votes	%
Conservative	Sally-Ann Hart	753	59.3
Conservative	Paul Osbourne	722	56.9
Liberal Democrats	Sue Schlesinger	368	29.0
Labour	Bob Ball	304	23.9
Majority			
Turnout			
Conservative hold			
Conservative hold			

=== Hurst Green & Ticehurst ===
Hurst Green & Ticehurst (2 seats)
Party	Candidate	Votes	%
Conservative	Mary Barnes	704	54.3
Conservative	Graham Browne	685	52.9
Liberal Democrats	Martin Saunders	502	38.7
Green	Don Nicholls	412	31.8
Majority			
Turnout			
Conservative win (new seat)			
Conservative win (new seat)			

=== North Battle, Netherfield & Whatlington ===
North Battle, Netherfield & Whatlington (2 seats)
Party	Candidate	Votes	%
Liberal Democrats	Kathryn Field	1,059	65.2
Liberal Democrats	Vikki Cook	963	59.3
Conservative	Louise Salter	389	24.0
Conservative	Paul Redstone	340	20.9
UKIP	Bernard Mabon	165	10.2
Labour	Christopher Husbands	145	8.9
Majority			
Turnout			
Liberal Democrats win (new seat)			
Liberal Democrats win (new seat)			

=== Northern Rother ===
Northern Rother (2 seats)
Party	Candidate	Votes	%
Conservative	Tony Ganly	935	58.8
Conservative	Martin Mooney	877	55.2
Liberal Democrats	Stephen Hardy	506	31.8
Labour	Jane Emery	278	17.5
Labour	Larry Hyett	176	11.1
Majority			
Turnout			
Conservative win (new seat)			
Conservative win (new seat)			

=== Robertsbridge ===
Robertsbridge
Party	Candidate	Votes	%
Liberal Democrats	Sue Prochak	569	67.7
Conservative	Robert Morris	220	26.2
Labour	Graham Good	51	6.1
Majority			
Turnout			
Liberal Democrats win (new seat)			

=== Rye & Winchelsea ===
Rye & Winchelsea (2 seats)
Party	Candidate	Votes	%
Conservative	Gennette Stevens	538	34.9
Liberal Democrats	Howard Norton	453	29.4
Independent	Chris Hoggart	451	29.2
Conservative	Jayne Stevens	407	26.4
Labour	Cheryl Creaser	397	25.7
Labour	Jonathan Lee	314	20.3
UKIP	Ruth Green	207	13.4
Majority			
Turnout			
Conservative win (new seat)			
Liberal Democrats win (new seat)			

=== Sedlescombe & Westfield ===
Sedlescombe & Westfield (2 seats)
Party	Candidate	Votes	%
Independent	Peter Vine-Hall	866	51.9
Conservative	Carl Maynard	718	43.0
Conservative	Jim Philcox	654	39.2
Labour	Beverly Coupar	391	23.4
Majority			
Turnout			
Independent win (new seat)			
Conservative win (new seat)			

=== South Battle & Telham ===
South Battle & Telham
Party	Candidate	Votes	%
Liberal Democrats	Kevin Dixon	406	63.6
Conservative	Daniel Coughlan	164	25.7
Labour	John Gately	68	10.7
Majority			
Turnout			
Liberal Democrats win (new seat)			

=== Southern Rother ===
Southern Rother (2 seats)
Party	Candidate	Votes	%
Liberal Democrats	Andrew Mier	787	48.1
Conservative	Roger Bird	742	45.4
Conservative	Chris Saint	664	40.6
Labour	Nick Warren	314	19.2
Labour	Elaine Lee	235	14.4
Majority			
Turnout			
Liberal Democrats win (new seat)			
Conservative win (new seat)			

== Changes 2019–2023 ==
Bexhill Central councillor Paul Courtel had the Labour Group whip withdrawn on 30 December 2020, after allegedly visiting Battle town centre while displaying COVID-19 symptoms; he continued to sit as a councillor.

=== By-elections ===
==== Eastern Rother by-election ====
A by-election was held in Eastern Rother on 6 May 2021 after the resignation of Sally-Ann Hart following her election to Parliament in the 2019 general election. The seat was won by Conservative candidate Lizzie Hacking.

Eastern Rother by-election 6 May 2021
Party	Candidate	Votes	%	±%
Conservative	Lizzie Hacking	999	63.5	+10.7
Labour	Ash Madden	300	19.1	−2.2
Liberal Democrats	Kate Lamb	273	17.4	−8.4
Majority		699	44.5	
Turnout		1,572	40.8	
Conservative hold		Swing		

==== Brede and Udimore by-election ====
A by-election was held in Brede and Udimore on 16 June 2022 after the death of Jonathan Johnson. The seat was won by Conservative candidate Neil Gordon.

Brede and Udimore by-election 16 June 2022
Party	Candidate	Votes	%	±%
Conservative	Neil Gordon	424	61.4	+21.4
Liberal Democrats	Martin Griffiths	266	38.6	+30.9
Majority		158	22.8	
Turnout		690		
Conservative hold		Swing		
