= 2023 Rother District Council election =

2023 UK local government election

- 4 May 2023

All 38 seats to Rother District Council 20 seats needed for a majority
	First party	Second party	Third party
Leader	Carl Maynard	Christine Bayliss	Doug Oliver
Party	Conservative	Labour	RAOIC
Last election	14 seats, 36.4%	3 seats, 12.6%	N/A
Seats before	15	2	11
Seats won	10	8	7
Seat change	▼4	▲5	▲7
Popular vote	16,852	6,400	5,968
Percentage	37.5%	14.2%	13.3%
Swing	▲1.4%	▲1.7%	N/A
	Fourth party	Fifth party	Sixth party
Leader	Sue Prochak	Polly Gray
Party	Liberal Democrats	Green	Independent
Last election	7 seats, 15.3%	1 seat, 4.2%	13 seats, 27.0%
Seats before	7	1	1
Seats won	7	3	3
Seat change	Steady	▲2	▼10
Popular vote	7,038	3,064	4,309
Percentage	15.7%	6.8%	9.6%
Swing	Steady	▲2.7%	▼17.3%
- Winner of each seat at the 2023 Rother District Council election.
Leader before election
Doug Oliver
RAOIC
No overall control
Leader after election
Doug Oliver
RAOIC
No overall control

The 2023 Rother District Council election took place on 4 May 2023 to elect members of Rother District Council in East Sussex, England. This would be on the same day as other local elections in England.

Prior to the election the council was administered by the "Rother Alliance", being a coalition of the Rother Association of Independent Councillors, Liberal Democrats, Labour and Greens.

The council remained under no overall control after the election, and the Rother Alliance coalition continued to form the council's administration.

== Summary ==
=== Election result ===
2023 Rother District Council election
Party	Candidates	Seats	Gains	Losses	Net gain/loss	Seats %	Votes %	Votes	+/−
Conservative	38	10	0	4	▼4	26.3	37.5	16,852	+1.1
Labour	16	8	5	0	▲5	21.1	14.2	6,400	+1.6
RAOIC	12	7	7	0	▲7	18.4	13.3	5,968	N/A
Liberal Democrats	13	7	2	2	Steady	18.4	15.7	7,038	+0.4
Green	8	3	2	0	▲2	7.9	6.8	3,064	+2.6
Independent	8	3	3	13	▼10	7.9	9.6	4,309	–17.4
UKIP	10	0	0	0	Steady	0.0	2.1	925	–2.5
Ind. Network	1	0	0	0	Steady	0.0	0.9	406	N/A

== Ward results ==
The Statement of Persons Nominated, which details the candidates standing in each ward, was released by Rother District Council following the close of nominations on 4 April 2023. The results were as follows:

=== Bexhill Central ===
Bexhill Central (2 seats)
Party	Candidate	Votes	%	±%
Labour	Christine Bayliss*	732	63.2	+11.0
Labour	Ruairi McCourt	579	50.0	+4.1
Conservative	Nurul Amin	250	21.6	−15.1
Conservative	Paul Webb	224	19.3	−8.2
Independent	Andrew Crotty	208	17.9	N/A
Independent	Andy Voyce	98	8.5	N/A
UKIP	Colin Sullivan	76	6.6	−8.4
Majority				
Turnout		1,159	28	
Rejected ballots		9	0.8	
Registered electors		4,162		
Labour hold		Swing		
Labour hold		Swing		

=== Bexhill Collington ===
Bexhill Collington (2 seats)
Party	Candidate	Votes	%	±%
RAOIC	Douglas Oliver*	1,148	64.9	+1.4
RAOIC	Ashan Jeeawon**	1,055	59.7	−6.5
Conservative	Bridget Hollingsworth	560	31.7	+15.3
Conservative	Balwinder Khaira	397	22.5	+9.8
UKIP	Jill Davies	176	10.0	+3.1
Majority				
Turnout		1,768	45	
Rejected ballots		17	1.0	
Registered electors		3,928		
RAOIC gain from Independent		Swing		
RAOIC gain from Independent		Swing		

Ashan Jeeawon was a sitting councillor for Bexhill St. Stephen's ward

=== Bexhill Kewhurst ===
Bexhill Kewhurst (2 seats)
Party	Candidate	Votes	%	±%
RAOIC	Brian Drayson*	671	42.7	−17.4
RAOIC	Andrew Hayward	637	40.6	−25.6
Conservative	Gillian Johnson	528	33.6	+2.6
Conservative	Martin Kenward	469	29.9	+8.1
Liberal Democrats	Bill Goddard	440	28.0	N/A
UKIP	Alison Phillips	140	8.9	+0.4
Majority				
Turnout		1,570	40	
Rejected ballots		9	0.6	
Registered electors		3,994		
RAOIC gain from Independent		Swing		
RAOIC gain from Independent		Swing		

=== Bexhill Old Town & Worsham ===
Bexhill Old Town & Worsham (2 seats)
Party	Candidate	Votes	%	±%
Green	Polly Gray*	535	54.1	+21.7
Labour	Mark Legg	374	37.8	+23.8
RAOIC	Chris Madeley*	323	32.7	+4.3
Conservative	Barbara Clark	282	28.5	+6.7
Conservative	Hannah Fisher	190	19.2	+1.6
UKIP	Michael Phillips	79	8.0	−7.6
Majority				
Turnout		989	30	
Registered electors		3,248		
Green hold		Swing		
Labour gain from Independent		Swing		

=== Bexhill Pebsham & St. Michael's ===
Bexhill Pebsham & St. Michael's (2 seats)
Party	Candidate	Votes	%	±%
Independent	Charles Clark*	754	60.6	−9.3
Labour	Gareth Delany	429	34.5	N/A
Conservative	Jay Brewerton*	391	31.4	−19.1
Independent	Charles Rustem	268	21.5	N/A
Conservative	Geoffrey Robertson	180	14.5	−6.6
UKIP	John Dicker	90	7.2	−5.0
Majority				
Turnout		1,244	31	
Rejected ballots		1	0.1	
Registered electors		3,956		
Independent hold		Swing		
Labour gain from Independent		Swing		

=== Bexhill Sackville ===
Bexhill Sackville (2 seats)
Party	Candidate	Votes	%	±%
RAOIC	Hazel Timpe*	643	48.4	+3.8
RAOIC	Terry Byrne*	629	47.4	+1.3
Conservative	Shaji Thomas	392	29.5	−1.6
Labour	Brian Basham	313	23.6	+5.0
Conservative	Christopher Rawdon-Mogg	293	22.1	−4.2
UKIP	Sheila Allen-Rodgers	122	9.2	−6.1
Majority				
Turnout		1,328	33	
Rejected ballots		6	0.4	
Registered electors		4,064		
RAOIC gain from Independent		Swing		
RAOIC gain from Independent		Swing		

=== Bexhill Sidley ===
Bexhill Sidley (2 seats)
Party	Candidate	Votes	%	±%
Labour	Sam Coleman*	507	52.1	+8.6
Labour	Fazlul Chowdhury	420	43.2	+10.0
Conservative	Jimmy Carroll*	377	38.7	+0.5
Independent	Sharon Blagrove	209	21.5	−11.8
Conservative	Brett McLean	203	20.9	−12.4
UKIP	John Zipser	61	6.3	−18.6
Majority				
Turnout		973	23	
Rejected ballots		6	0.6	
Registered electors		4,249		
Labour hold		Swing		
Labour gain from Conservative		Swing		

=== Bexhill St. Mark's ===
Bexhill St. Mark's (2 seats)
Party	Candidate	Votes	%	±%
Independent	Connor Winter	630	37.3	−34.7
RAOIC	Jimmy Stanger	527	31.2	−35.0
Conservative	Tony Foster	474	28.0	+9.1
Ind. Network	Nigel Jacklin	406	24.0	N/A
Conservative	Nathaniel Lake	315	18.6	+4.2
Liberal Democrats	Wendy Dash	241	14.3	+6.7
Labour	Peter Hillier-Palmer	239	14.1	+8.3
Labour	Justin Pierce	191	11.3	N/A
UKIP	Christine Zipser	99	5.9	−1.0
Majority				
Turnout		1,691	41	
Rejected ballots		5	0.3	
Registered electors		4,091		
Independent hold		Swing		
RAOIC gain from Independent		Swing		

=== Bexhill St. Stephen's ===
Bexhill St. Stephen's (2 seats)
Party	Candidate	Votes	%	±%
Green	Arren Rathbone Ariel	561	45.3	+18.6
Liberal Democrats	Richard Thomas*	548	44.3	+17.3
Conservative	Abul Azad	462	37.3	+16.4
Conservative	Richard Carroll	425	34.3	+11.5
UKIP	Gillian Ammoun	139	11.2	−4.4
Majority				
Turnout		1,238	31	
Rejected ballots		9	0.7	
Registered electors		3,961		
Green gain from Independent		Swing		
Liberal Democrats hold		Swing		

=== Brede & Udimore ===
Brede & Udimore
Party	Candidate	Votes	%	±%
Conservative	Neil Gordon	414	58.3	+18.3
Liberal Democrats	Martin Griffiths	239	33.7	+26.0
Labour	Sandra Margaret	57	8.0	−2.3
Majority				
Turnout		710	39	
Rejected ballots		2	0.3	
Registered electors		1,809		
Conservative hold		Swing		

=== Burwash & The Weald ===
Burwash & The Weald (2 seats)
Party	Candidate	Votes	%	±%
Conservative	Anthony Barnes*	610	47.7	−4.3
Conservative	Eleanor Kirby-Green*	605	47.3	+1.2
Liberal Democrats	Mary Varrall	541	42.3	+10.0
Independent	Heather Love	448	35.0	N/A
Majority				
Turnout		1,279	36	
Rejected ballots		10	0.8	
Registered electors		3,583		
Conservative hold		Swing		
Conservative hold		Swing		

=== Catsfield & Crowhurst ===
Catsfield & Crowhurst
Party	Candidate	Votes	%	±%
Liberal Democrats	Chas Pearce	403	48.4	+21.2
Conservative	Gary Curtis*	275	33.1	−5.3
Labour	Tim MacPherson	154	18.5	N/A
Majority				
Turnout		832	43	
Rejected ballots		5	0.6	
Registered electors		1,928		
Liberal Democrats gain from Conservative		Swing		

=== Eastern Rother ===
Eastern Rother (2 seats)
Party	Candidate	Votes	%	±%
Conservative	Lizzie Hacking*	605	44.3	−15.0
Conservative	Paul Osborne*	578	42.3	−14.6
Green	Dominic Manning	563	41.2	N/A
Green	Catherine Glover	466	34.1	N/A
Labour	Linda Whymark	300	21.9	−2.0
Majority				
Turnout		1,367	36	
Rejected ballots		14	1.0	
Registered electors		3,804		
Conservative hold		Swing		
Conservative hold		Swing		

=== Hurst Green & Ticehurst ===
Hurst Green & Ticehurst (2 seats)
Party	Candidate	Votes	%	±%
Liberal Democrats	Teresa Killeen	740	54.1	+15.4
Conservative	Mary Barnes*	635	46.4	−7.9
Liberal Democrats	Stephen Hardy	611	44.7	N/A
Conservative	Graham Browne*	603	44.1	−8.8
Majority				
Turnout		1,368	33	
Rejected ballots		8	0.6	
Registered electors		4,137		
Liberal Democrats gain from Conservative		Swing		
Conservative hold		Swing		

=== North Battle, Netherfield & Whatlington ===
North Battle, Netherfield & Whatlington (2 seats)
Party	Candidate	Votes	%	±%
Liberal Democrats	Kathryn Field*	1,092	73.3	+8.1
Green	Sue Burton	939	63.1	N/A
Conservative	Mark Beaumont	305	20.5	−3.5
Conservative	Kirsty Curtis	266	17.9	−3.0
UKIP	Bernard Mabon	65	4.4	−5.8
Majority				
Turnout		1,489	39	
Rejected ballots		4	0.3	
Registered electors		3,848		
Liberal Democrats hold		Swing		
Green gain from Liberal Democrats		Swing		

=== Northern Rother ===
Northern Rother (2 seats)
Party	Candidate	Votes	%	±%
Conservative	Tony Ganly*	881	52.1	−6.7
Conservative	Tony Biggs	880	52.0	−3.2
Independent	Peter Vine-Hall	851	50.3	N/A
Majority				
Turnout		1,691	42	
Rejected ballots		21	1.2	
Registered electors		4,086		
Conservative hold		Swing		
Conservative hold		Swing		

=== Robertsbridge ===
Robertsbridge
Party	Candidate	Votes	%	±%
Liberal Democrats	Sue Prochak*	519	73.1	+5.4
Conservative	Paul Redstone	191	26.9	+0.7
Majority				
Turnout		710	38	
Rejected ballots		5	0.7	
Registered electors		2,019		
Liberal Democrats hold		Swing		

=== Rye & Winchelsea ===
Rye & Winchelsea (2 seats)
Party	Candidate	Votes	%	±%
Labour Co-op	Cheryl Creaser	608	39.4	+13.7
Labour Co-op	Simon McGurk	606	39.3	+19.0
Liberal Democrats	Guy Harris	506	32.8	+3.4
Conservative	Gennette Stevens*	435	28.2	−6.7
Conservative	Jayne Stevens	371	24.0	−2.4
RAOIC	Chris Hoggart	335	21.7	−7.5
Majority				
Turnout		1,543	39	
Rejected ballots		5	0.3	
Registered electors		3,930		
Labour Co-op gain from Conservative		Swing		
Labour Co-op gain from Liberal Democrats		Swing		

=== Sedlescombe & Westfield ===
Sedlescombe & Westfield (2 seats)
Party	Candidate	Votes	%	±%
Independent	Beverley Coupar	843	57.7	+34.3
Conservative	Carl Maynard*	714	48.9	+5.9
Conservative	Kate Ludden	647	44.3	+5.1
Majority				
Turnout		1,461	35	
Rejected ballots		27	1.8	
Registered electors		4,257		
Independent gain from Independent		Swing		
Conservative hold		Swing		

=== South Battle & Telham ===
South Battle & Telham
Party	Candidate	Votes	%	±%
Liberal Democrats	Vikki Cook	388	64.8	+1.2
Conservative	Bernard Brown	211	35.2	+9.5
Majority				
Turnout		599	35	
Rejected ballots		8	1.3	
Registered electors		1,736		
Liberal Democrats hold		Swing		

=== Southern Rother ===
Southern Rother (2 seats)
Party	Candidate	Votes	%	±%
Liberal Democrats	Andrew Mier*	770	47.5	−0.6
Conservative	Tim Grohne	645	39.8	−5.6
Conservative	James Bradley	569	35.1	−5.5
Labour	Nick Warren	489	30.2	+11.0
Labour	Sue Learoyd-Smith	402	24.8	+10.4
Majority				
Turnout		1,621	36	
Rejected ballots		17	1.0	
Registered electors		3,566		
Liberal Democrats hold		Swing		
Conservative hold		Swing		

== Changes 2023–2027 ==
Sedlescombe & Westfield councillor Beverley Coupar, elected as an unaligned independent, joined the Liberal Democrat group in July 2025.

Bexhill St Marks councillor Jimmy Stanger left the Rother Association of Independent Councillors to join the Liberal Democrat group at the end of September 2025.

Rye & Winchelsea councillor Cheryl Creaser resigned from the Labour Party in late December 2025 to sit as an independent, saying her decision was "unconnected to national politics".

=== By-elections ===
==== Catsfield & Crowhurst ====
Catsfield & Crowhurst by-election: 26 June 2025
Party	Candidate	Votes	%	±%
Liberal Democrats	Nicola Mclaren	267	36.6	–11.8
Reform	Bernard Brown	200	27.4	N/A
Conservative	Joe Carter	162	22.2	–10.9
Labour	Timothy Macpherson	101	13.8	–4.7
Majority		67	9.2	–6.1
Turnout		731	37.0	–6.2
Registered electors		1,975		
Liberal Democrats hold				

==== Rye & Winchelsea ====
Rye & Winchelsea by-election: 7 May 2026
Party	Candidate	Votes	%	±%
Reform	Daniel Bradley	531	27.3	N/A
Green	Dominic Manning	500	25.7	N/A
Labour	Amanda Pollard	402	20.6	−21.8
Conservative	David Cooke	368	18.9	−9.3
Liberal Democrats	Derek Greenup	146	7.5	−10.2
Majority		31	1.6	N/A
Turnout		1,947	49.5	+10.5
Reform gain from Labour				
