= Jess Steele =

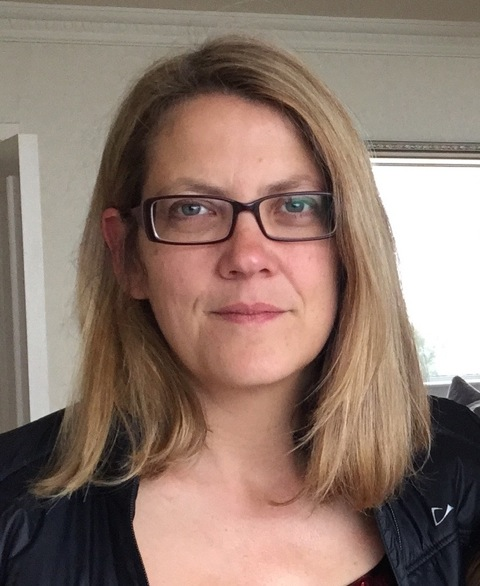

Jess Steele, OBE, OBE is a British community activist based in Hastings, England. She has been involved in community regeneration and played a significant role in local projects such as the restoration of Hastings Pier and the revitalization of Hastings Commons. Steele was recognized for her contributions to the social sector by being appointed an Officer of the Order of the British Empire (OBE).

== Background ==
Jess Steele lives and works in Hastings. Her work has included leading efforts to save and restore community landmarks such as the Observer Building and Rock House, projects designed to provide affordable housing and creative spaces.

== Career ==
Steele has spent over 30 years collaborating with community groups, local governments, and academic institutions on regeneration initiatives. She played a critical role in the campaign to save Hastings Pier, which later won the prestigious Stirling Prize for architecture.

In addition to her local projects, Steele is the director of Jericho Road Solutions, an organization that supports grassroots and community-led projects across the United Kingdom.
