= Rother District =

Coordinates: 50°50′N 0°28′E

- Non-metropolitan district
- Rother shown within East Sussex
- Sovereign state: United Kingdom
- Constituent country: England
- Region: South East England
- Non-metropolitan county: East Sussex
- Status: Non-metropolitan district
- Admin HQ: Bexhill-on-Sea
- Incorporated: 1 April 1974

Government
  - Type: Non-metropolitan district council
  - Body: Rother District Council
  - Leadership: Leader and Cabinet
  - MPs: Kieran Mullan; Helena Dollimore

Area
  - Total: 197.6 sq mi (511.8 km^{2})
  - Rank: 77th (of 296)

Population (2024)
  - Total: 96,133
  - Rank: 257th (of 296)
  - Density: 486.5/sq mi (187.8/km^{2})

Ethnicity (2021)
  - Ethnic groups: List: 95.6% White; 1.8% Mixed; 1.5% Asian; 0.6% Black; 0.5% other

Religion (2021)
  - Religion: List: 50.9% Christianity; 40.7% no religion; 6.6% not stated; 0.6% Islam; 0.6% other; 0.4% Buddhism; 0.2% Hinduism; 0.2% Judaism; 0.1% Sikhism
- Time zone: UTC0 (GMT)
  - Summer (DST): UTC+1 (BST)
- ONS code: 21UG (ONS); E07000064 (GSS)
- OS grid reference: TQ7308

Rother is a local government district in East Sussex, England. Its council is based in Bexhill-on-Sea. The new district was named Rother after the River Rother which flows through the district.

The neighbouring districts are Wealden, Tunbridge Wells, Ashford, Folkestone and Hythe, and Hastings. Aside from its coast, Hastings is surrounded by Rother.

== History ==
The district was formed on 1 April 1974 under the Local Government Act 1972. It covered the area of three former districts, which were all abolished at the same time:

- Battle Rural District was established in 1934 from a merger of Battle Urban District Council with the rural district councils of Battle, Hastings, Rye and Ticehurst. The council was based at Watch Oak on Chain Lane, Battle.
- Bexhill Municipal Borough was established by Royal Charter in 1902 and was based at Bexhill Town Hall, built for Bexhill Urban District Council in 1895.
- Rye Municipal Borough Council met at Rye Town Hall.

Local government reorganisation is being considered for the area. In July 2026, the government announced reforms across East Sussex which included abolishing Rother district and creating an East Sussex unitary authority covering most of the county council's current area. In September 2026 these proposals were paused for further review.

== Governance ==
Rother District Council

Type
- Type: District Council

Leadership
- Chair: Mark Legg, Labour since 18 May 2026
- Leader: Doug Oliver, RAOIC since 22 May 2019
- Chief Executive: Lorna Ford since May 2023

Structure
- Seats: 38 councillors
- Graph of the party split among 38 seats.
- Political groups: Rother Alliance (24) RAOIC (6) Liberal Democrats (9) Labour (6) Green (3) Other parties (14) Conservative (10) Reform UK (1) Independent (3)

Elections
- Voting system: First past the post
- Last election: 4 May 2023

Meeting place
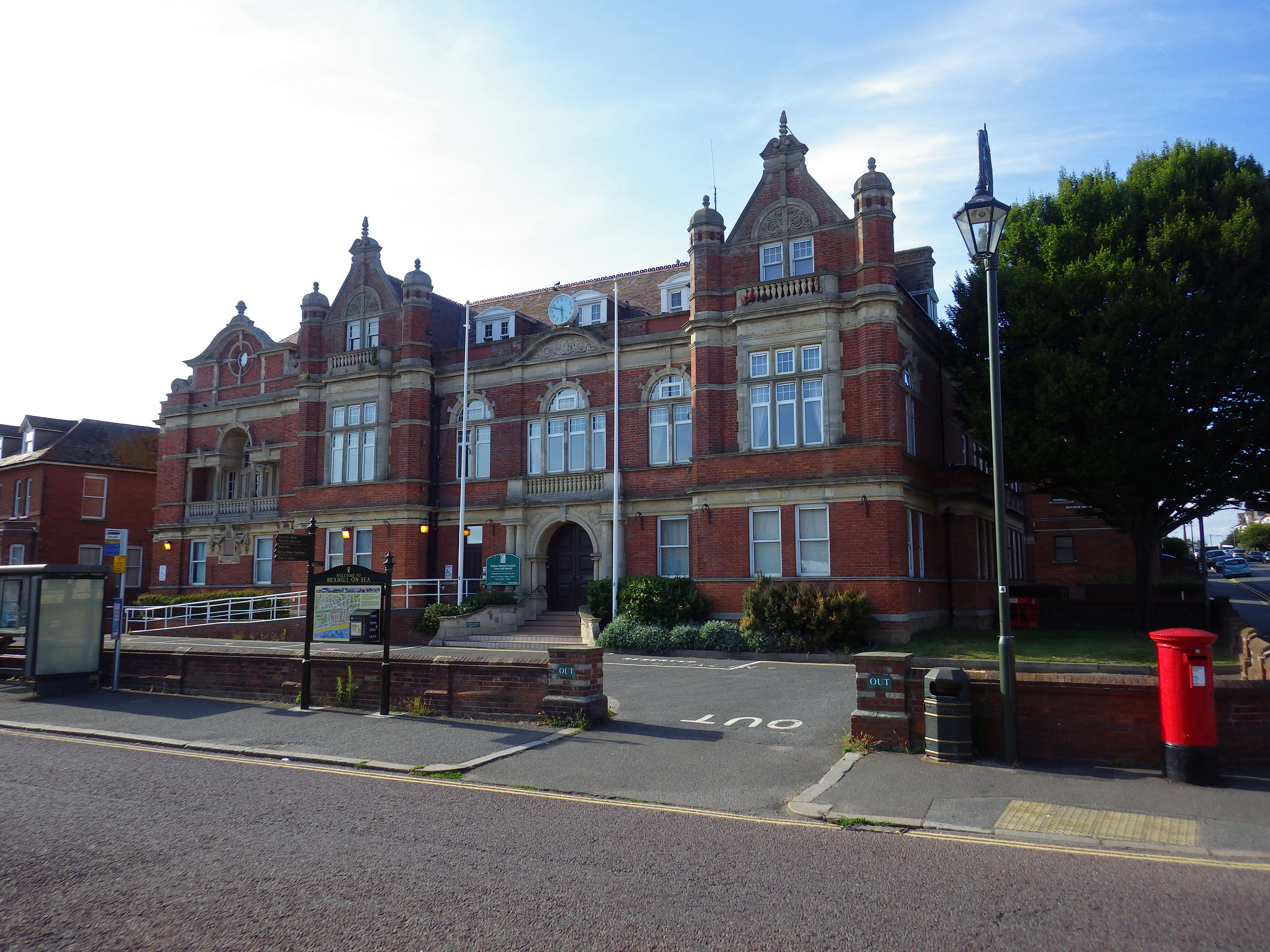
- Town Hall, London Road, Bexhill-on-Sea, TN39 3JX

Website
- www.rother.gov.uk

Rother District Council provides district-level services. County-level services are provided by East Sussex County Council. The whole district is also covered by civil parishes, which form a third tier of local government.

=== Political control ===
The council has been under no overall control since the 2019 election, being led by a coalition called the 'Rother Alliance' comprising Labour, Liberal Democrats, Greens and some of the independent councillors. The independents in the Rother Alliance formed a local political party in January 2023 called the 'Rother Association of Independent Councillors' (RAOIC).

The first election to the council was held in 1973, initially operating as a shadow authority alongside the outgoing authorities until the new arrangements came into effect on 1 April 1974. Political control of the council since 1974 has been as follows:

| Party in control | Years |
|---|---|
| Independent | 1974–1979 |
| No overall control | 1979–1983 |
| Conservative | 1983–1991 |
| No overall control | 1991–1999 |
| Conservative | 1999–2019 |
| No overall control | 2019–present |

=== Leadership ===
The leaders of the council since 1999 have been:

| Councillor | Party | From | To |
|---|---|---|---|
| Ivor Brampton | Conservative | 1999 | 17 Jan 2001 |
| Graham Gubby | Conservative | 2001 | May 2007 |
| Carl Maynard | Conservative | 23 May 2007 | 22 May 2019 |
| Doug Oliver | Independent | 22 May 2019 | 31 Jan 2023 |
| Doug Oliver | RAOIC | 31 Jan 2023 | |

=== Composition ===
Following the 2023 election and by-elections and changes of allegiance up to May 2026, the composition of the council was:

| Party | Councillors |
|---|---|
| Conservative | 10 |
| Liberal Democrats | 9 |
| Labour | 6 |
| Rother Association of Independent Councillors | 6 |
| Green | 3 |
| Reform | 1 |
| Independent | 3 |
| Total | 38 |

=== Premises ===
The council is based at Bexhill Town Hall on London Road in Bexhill, which was built in 1895 for the Bexhill Urban District Council, which became Bexhill Borough Council in 1902. The building continued to serve as the seat of local government following the reorganisation in 1974 which created Rother District.

== Elections ==
Since the last boundary changes in 2019 the council has comprised 38 councillors representing 21 wards, with each ward electing one or two councillors. Elections are held every four years.

== Parishes ==
The lowest level of local government is the civil parish; there are 34 within Rother. The parish councils for the three parishes of Battle, Bexhill-on-Sea and Rye take the style "town council". The two parishes of Ashburnham and Penhurst share a grouped parish council. The parish of East Guldeford has a parish meeting rather than a parish council due to its small population.

- Ashburnham
- Battle (town)
- Beckley
- Bexhill-on-Sea (town)
- Bodiam
- Brede
- Brightling
- Burwash
- Camber
- Catsfield
- Crowhurst
- Dallington
- East Guldeford
- Etchingham
- Ewhurst
- Fairlight
- Guestling
- Hurst Green
- Icklesham (includes Winchelsea and Rye Harbour)
- Iden
- Mountfield
- Northiam
- Peasmarsh
- Penhurst
- Pett
- Playden
- Rye (town)
- Rye Foreign
- Salehurst and Robertsbridge
- Sedlescombe
- Ticehurst
- Udimore
- Westfield
- Whatlington

== Geography ==
Rother District covers two areas of relief: to the south, a section of the High Weald; and to the north the lower land, named the Rother Levels, across which flow the River Rother, which rises on the Weald and flows easterly towards Rye Bay, and its tributaries. For much of the course of the main river it constitutes the boundary between East Sussex and Kent, and is given the alternative title of the ’’Kent Ditch’’. Tributaries of the river include the Rivers Dudwell, Tillingham and Brede.

The district reaches the coast in the vicinity of Bexhill, and on the shores of Rye Bay.

=== Climate ===
Climate in this area has mild differences between highs and lows, and there is adequate rainfall year round. The Köppen Climate Classification subtype for this climate is "Cfb" (Marine West Coast Climate/Oceanic climate).

Climate data for Rother, UK
| Month | Jan | Feb | Mar | Apr | May | Jun | Jul | Aug | Sep | Oct | Nov | Dec | Year |
|---|---|---|---|---|---|---|---|---|---|---|---|---|---|
| Mean daily maximum °C (°F) | 8 (46) | 8 (46) | 11 (52) | 13 (55) | 17 (63) | 19 (66) | 23 (73) | 22 (72) | 18 (64) | 14 (57) | 10 (50) | 7 (45) | 14 (57) |
| Mean daily minimum °C (°F) | 1 (34) | 1 (34) | 3 (37) | 4 (39) | 6 (43) | 9 (48) | 12 (54) | 11 (52) | 9 (48) | 6 (43) | 3 (37) | 1 (34) | 6 (43) |
| Average precipitation mm (inches) | 43 (1.7) | 30 (1.2) | 28 (1.1) | 43 (1.7) | 28 (1.1) | 41 (1.6) | 89 (3.5) | 38 (1.5) | 61 (2.4) | 48 (1.9) | 43 (1.7) | 66 (2.6) | 550 (21.8) |
| Average precipitation days | 21 | 19 | 22 | 20 | 16 | 19 | 16 | 16 | 19 | 22 | 21 | 21 | 232 |
Source: Weatherbase

== Demographics ==
Rother has one of the oldest populations (with a median age of 52 years) and the lowest per capita income in the UK. A study using 2011 census data found that 47% of the resident population lived in urban areas, 23% in rural towns and their fringes, and 29% in rural villages or dispersed.

== Transport ==
There are several main roads crossing the district. The major trunk road is the A21, London to Hastings road; it is joined by the A28 road from Ashford road near Hastings; which in turn is crossed by the A268 Hawkhurst to Rye road. There is also the A259 coastal route

The Hastings Line, East Coastway Line and the Marshlink Line are the three railway lines in the District; The Kent and East Sussex Railway tourist line terminates at Bodiam.

Long-distance footpaths include the Sussex Border Path; and the Saxon Shore Way, which links with the 1066 Country Walk.

== Landmarks ==
Major landmarks include Bodiam and Camber Castles; Battle Abbey; and the De La Warr Pavilion.
