= List of places of worship in Rother =

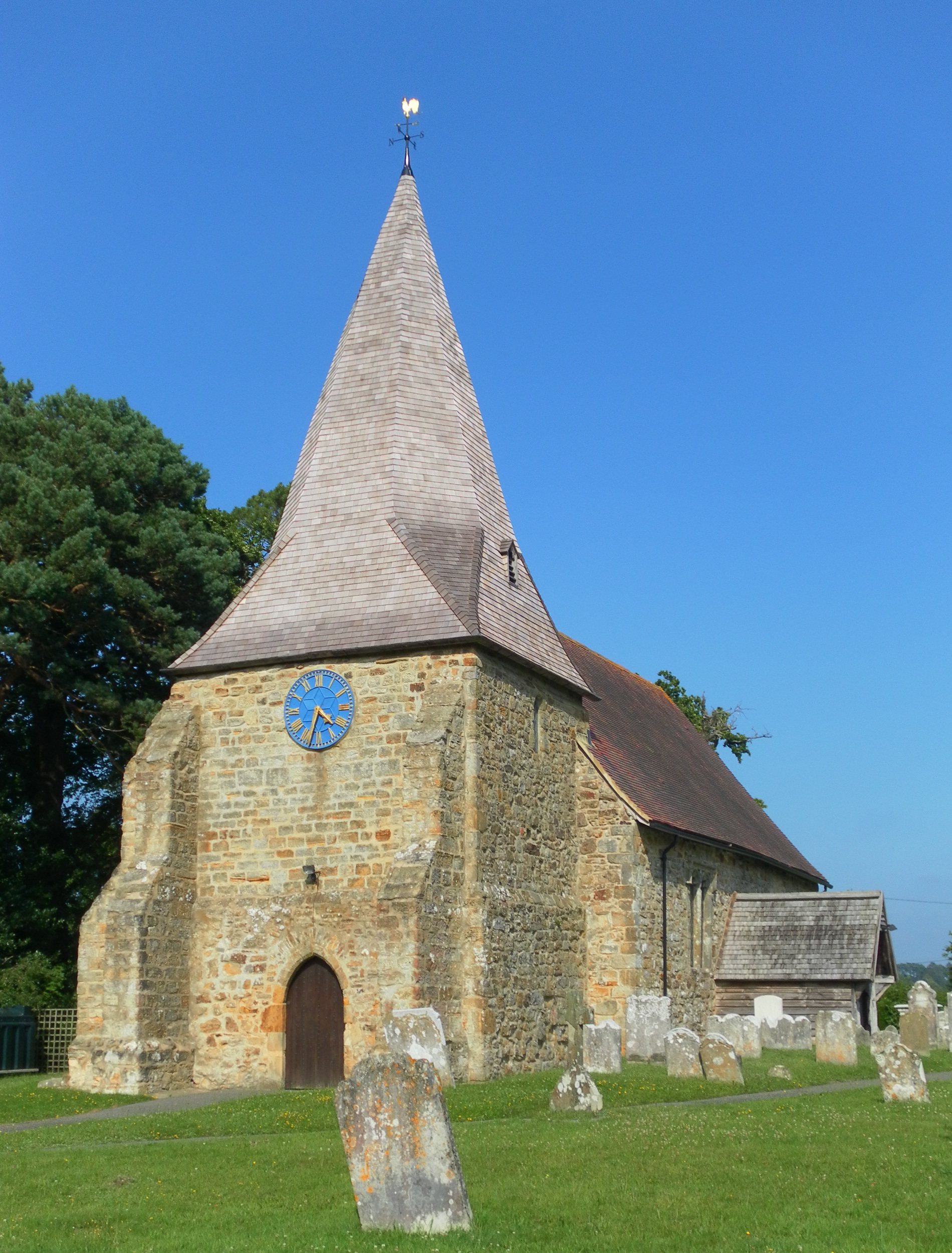
Ancient parish churches serving small villages—such as All Saints Church at Mountfield—characterise the district of Rother.

The district of Rother, one of six local government districts in the English county of East Sussex, has more than 130 current and former places of worship. 83 active churches and chapels, one mosque and one Buddhist centre serve the mostly rural area, and a further 50 former places of worship still stand but are no longer in religious use. The district's main urban centres—the Victorian seaside resort of Bexhill-on-Sea and the ancient inland towns of Battle and Rye—have many churches, some of considerable age. Others serve villages and hamlets scattered across the Wealden hills and marshes of the district. Even small settlements have parish churches serving the Church of England, the country's state religion. Roman Catholicism is less well established than in neighbouring West Sussex, but Protestant Nonconformist denominations have been prominent for centuries. Methodism was especially popular in the area: many chapels were built in the 18th and 19th centuries, although some have since closed. The majority of the population is Christian, and the mosque and Buddhist centre in Bexhill-on-Sea are the only non-Christian place of worship.

Dozens of buildings have been awarded listed status by English Heritage in recognition of their architectural and historical interest. These range from the Saxon-era parish churches in villages such as Beckley and Guestling to the Mediterranean-style Romanesque Revival St Anthony of Padua Church in Rye, built in the 1920s. Likewise, chapels as simple as the cottage-like former Bethel Chapel in Robertsbridge and as elaborate as the "rich and fruity" neighbouring United Reformed Church have been listed.

Various administrative areas operated by the Church of England, the Roman Catholic Church, the United Reformed Church, Baptists and Methodists cover churches in the district which are part of their denomination. These areas include dioceses, archdeaconries, networks and circuits.

== Overview of the district and its places of worship ==
The district of Rother covers the eastern part of East Sussex and surrounds the Borough of Hastings.

Rother district occupies about 200 square miles (520 km^{2}) of the eastern part of the county of East Sussex. It is one of five districts and boroughs in the county; its western boundary is the district of Wealden, and it surrounds the borough of Hastings to the south. The boroughs of Tunbridge Wells and Ashford and the district of Folkestone and Hythe in the neighbouring county of Kent form Rother's northern and eastern border. The district is named after the River Rother, which enters the English Channel at Rye. Approximately 90,000 people live in the district, of whom about half are residents of the largest town and administrative centre, Bexhill-on-Sea. The only other towns, both with ancient origins, are Rye and Battle. The rest of the district is mostly undulating High Wealden countryside punctuated with small, historic villages.

Sussex—the Kingdom of the South Saxons—was one of the last parts of England to be Christianised. It was isolated from other parts of the country because of the thick forest that covered it. When St Wilfrid and his missionaries brought Christianity to the area in the 7th century, they arrived by sea. The new religion quickly spread; the longest established churches in the present Rother area are apparently St Peter's Church in Bexhill's old town and All Saints Church at Icklesham, both founded in 772 (but no 8th-century fabric remains at either location). Many more churches were built in the Saxon era, but most were either superseded by larger Norman buildings between the 11th and 13th centuries—as at Sedlescombe and Whatlington—or substantially added to, as at Icklesham. Many places also gained their first church during this period, and the size and opulence of some (such as Ticehurst and Salehurst) reflect the area's iron-industry wealth at the time. Nevertheless, some parishes were initially very large: for example, both Bodiam and Etchingham were served from Salehurst parish church until their own churches were built in the 14th century.

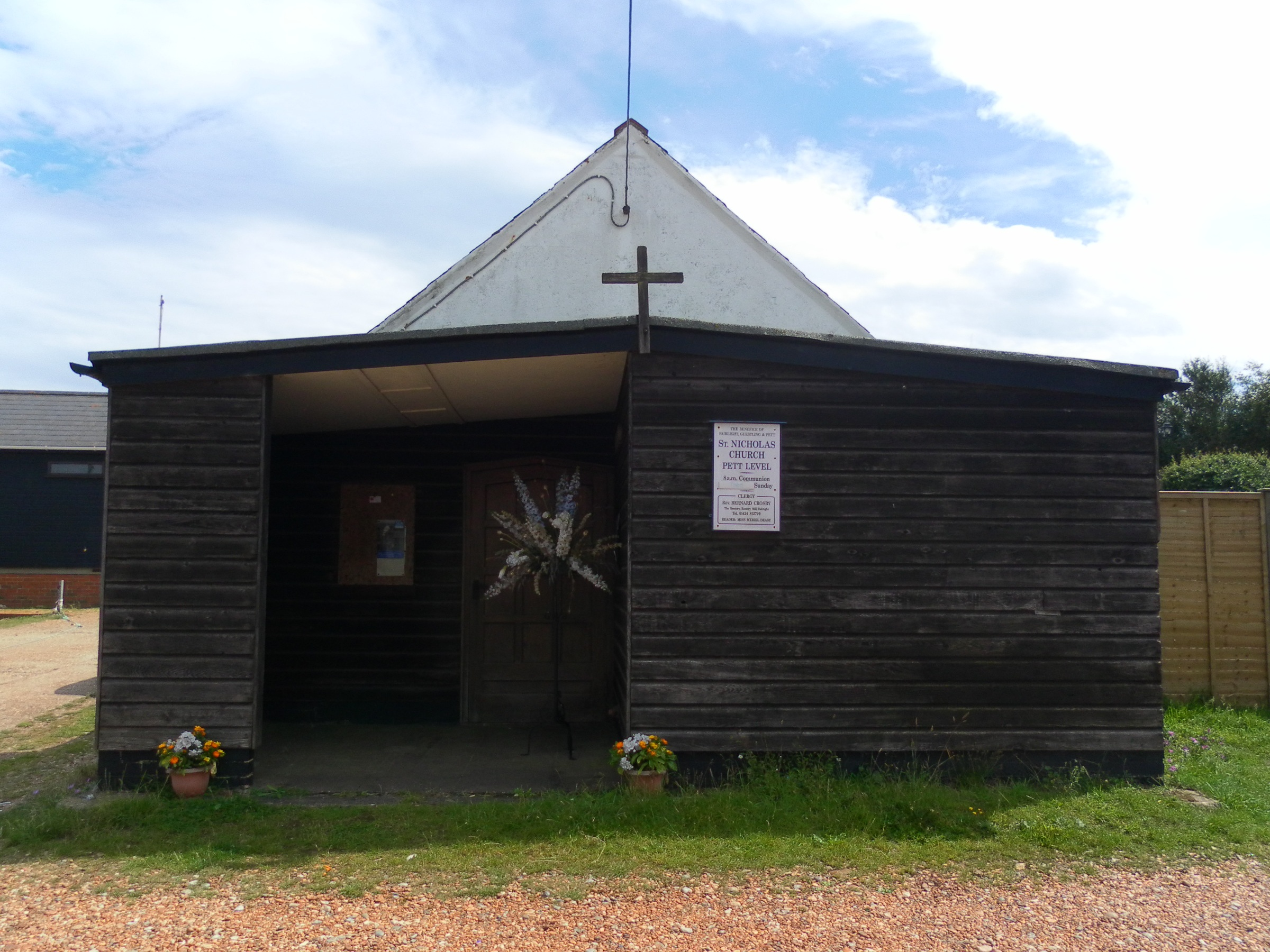
One of Rother's smaller and more unusual churches is this converted Lifesaving Rocket Apparatus Station at Pett Level, now known as St Nicholas' Church.

By the 19th century, few villages lacked an Anglican church, and attention turned to restoring and reconstructing ancient buildings—although places such as Hurst Green, Netherfield, Staplecross and Telham did receive churches of their own, often built as chapels of ease to distant parish churches. Some ancient churches still retain most of their medieval fabric and appearance, but churches such as Dallington, Northiam and Sedlescombe were so comprehensively rebuilt in the mid-19th century that they now have a largely Victorian appearance. (Wholesale restoration of churches in the then-fashionable Gothic Revival style was a common and much criticised practice during the Victorian era.) In the 20th century, Anglican churches continued to be provided as residential development spread along the English Channel coast east of Hastings. Building styles varied: at Winchelsea Beach, old-fashioned brick, timber and tile-hanging were used in 1962; at Fairlight Cove, a square wooden box-like structure, intended to be both temporary and portable, has stood since 1970; in Camber, the 1956 replacement for a bombed-out chapel of ease is in an old-fashioned early-20th-century style; and at Cliff End on Pett Level an unusual building was purchased and reused. The Admiralty installed a Lifesaving Rocket Apparatus Station on the beach; in 1935 it was converted into the tiny St Nicholas' Church.

After the English Reformation, Roman Catholic worship was illegal in England for nearly 250 years until 1791, and it grew slowly thereafter in comparison to West Sussex, where many large estates were owned by gentry who secretly kept the faith over many generations. Ill-feeling towards Catholics apparently persisted well into the 19th century in Battle, where the 1886 Church of Our Lady Immaculate and St Michael was set well back from the street (in the garden of its presbytery) and does not have an ecclesiastical appearance. In the early 20th century, bolder architectural statements were made with the Gothic Revival church at Bexhill-on-Sea and the elaborate Italian Romanesque-style church at Rye, both of which are listed buildings. Most of the other Roman Catholic churches in Rother district are simple mid-20th-century buildings, sometimes with distinguishing architectural features such as a modernistic portico-style entrance at the former church at Sidley, dalle de verre glass at Burwash and a Mediterranean-style blank-arcaded tower at Little Common.

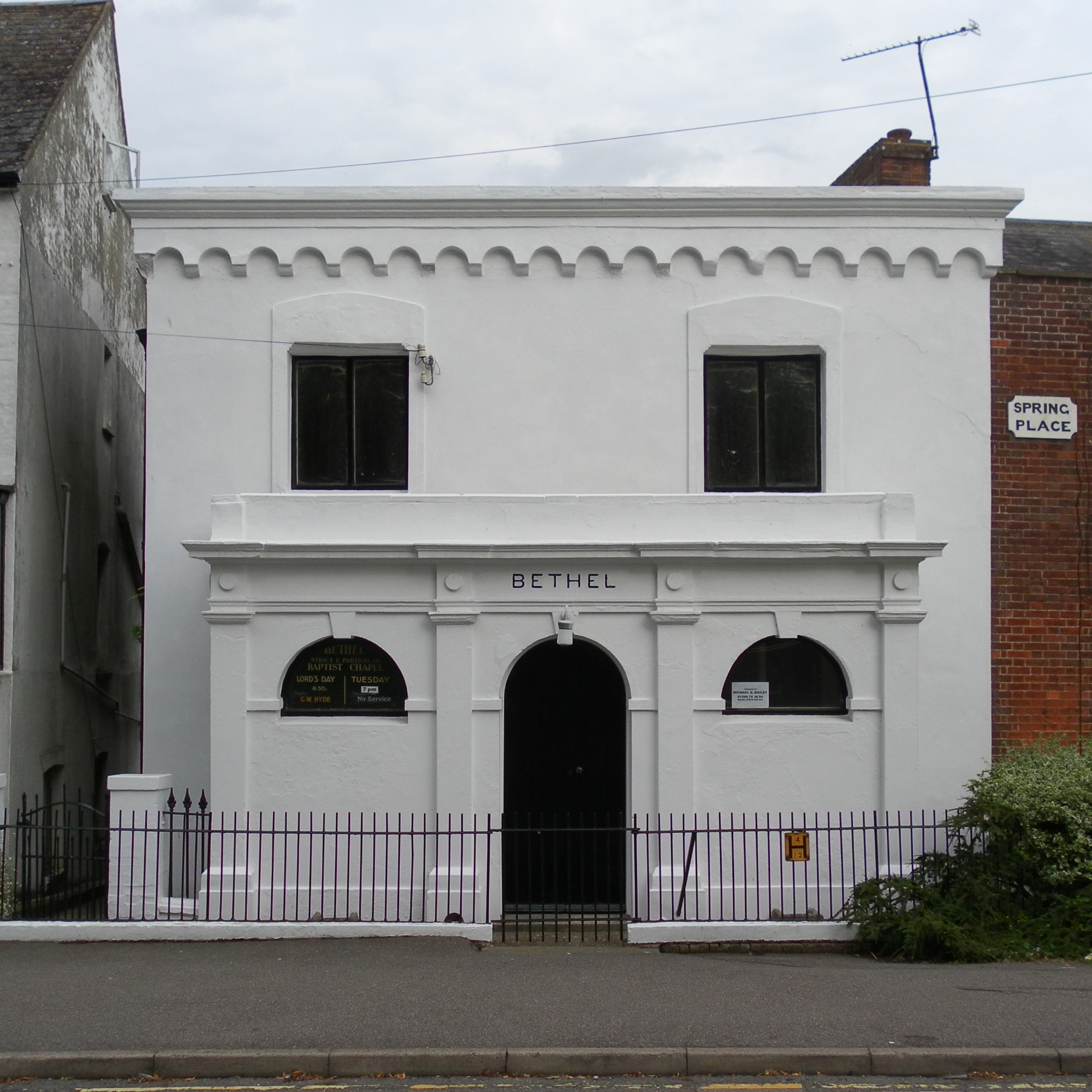
Protestant Nonconformism has a long history in Rye, where Baptist congregations have occupied five different buildings. The Bethel chapel of 1858, in use until 2018, is one.

Of the various Protestant Nonconformist denominations, Methodism has been especially prominent since the 18th century. Chapels built for Wesleyan Methodists are particularly numerous and can be found in many villages, although many have closed (Methodist worship has been in decline nationwide since the early 20th century). John Wesley himself was a frequent visitor to the area, and the church he founded at Rye in 1789 was the administrative base of a vast Circuit covering much of Sussex and Kent. His last ever outdoor sermon was preached beneath a tree near Winchelsea Methodist Chapel. The Methodist Statistical Returns published in 1947 (Note: The statistical return was compiled between 1940 and 1947 with the aim of documenting all Methodist chapels extant at that time: their location, previous affiliation prior to the Methodist Union of 1932, capacity, building materials and similar details.) recorded the existence of two chapels of Wesleyan origin in Northiam and one each at Battle, Beckley, Bexhill, Broad Oak, Burwash Weald, Catsfield, Crowhurst, Dallington, Etchingham, Hurst Green, Iden, Little Common, Mountfield, Peasmarsh, Robertsbridge, Rye, Staplecross, Ticehurst, Udimore, Wadhurst and Whatlington in addition to the Winchelsea chapel. There were also United Methodist (originally Bible Christian) chapels at Icklesham, Pett, Three Oaks and Westfield and a single Primitive Methodist chapel, Christ Church, at Bexhill. Almost all of these buildings still stand, but only the chapels at Broad Oak, Little Common, Pett and Rye remain in religious use by Methodists, along with the two at Bexhill and a newly built church centre at Battle which opened in 2014.

Rye was a hotbed of Nonconformist worship: a religious census in 1676 found 300 Nonconformists in the town, more than ten times as many as in the much larger parish of Salehurst, which had the next highest number. In 1847, chapels existed for Methodists, Presbyterians, Independents, Baptists, Quakers and Unitarians; Congregationalists, the Salvation Army and Jehovah's Witnesses also set up places of worship in the town later; and the Baptists split into several groups and have occupied five buildings over the years—all of which still stand. Elsewhere, Baptist churches can also be found in Battle, Bexhill and Sidley; Quakers now meet in Bexhill; and members of the United Reformed Church, formed by a union of the Congregational Church and the Presbyterian Church of England in 1972, worship in Ashburnham, Bexhill and Sedlescombe and also used a chapel in Robertsbridge until 2015. In the second half of the 20th century, Pentecostal churches became established in Beckley (registered in 1956), Bexhill and Crowhurst (1991).

== Religious affiliation ==
According to the United Kingdom Census 2011, 90,588 people lived in Rother. Of these, 64.81% identified themselves as Christian, 0.51% were Muslim, 0.19% were Jewish, 0.32% were Buddhist, 0.19% were Hindu, 0.01% were Sikh, 0.58% followed another religion, 25.24% claimed no religious affiliation and 8.16% did not state their religion. The proportion of Christians was higher than the 59.38% in England as a whole, and the proportions of people claiming adherence to another religion or no religious affiliation were also higher in Rother than nationally (the figures for England as a whole were 0.43% and 24.74% respectively). The percentage of people in Rother not answering this census question was also higher than the 7.18% nationally. Other religions named in the census had much lower proportions of followers than in England overall—the corresponding national percentages were 5.02% for Islam, 1.52% for Hinduism, 0.79% for Sikhism, 0.49% for Judaism and 0.45% for Buddhists.

== Administration ==
All Anglican churches in Rother district are part of the Diocese of Chichester, whose cathedral is at Chichester, and the Lewes and Hastings Archdeaconry—one of three subdivisions which make up the next highest level of administration. In turn, this archdeaconry is divided into eight deaneries. The churches at Flimwell, Stonegate and Ticehurst are in the Rural Deanery of Rotherfield. The Rural Deanery of Rye covers 23 churches in the district: Beckley, Bodiam, Brede, Camber, East Guldeford, Ewhurst Green, Fairlight, Fairlight Cove, Guestling, Icklesham, Iden, Northiam, Peasmarsh, Pett, Pett Level, Playden, Rye, Rye Harbour, Staplecross, Udimore, Westfield, Winchelsea and Winchelsea Beach. Those at Brightling, Burwash, Burwash Common, Dallington, Etchingham, Hurst Green, Mountfield, Netherfield, Robertsbridge and Salehurst are part of the Rural Deanery of Dallington. The Rural Deanery of Battle and Bexhill administers the churches at Ashburnham, Battle, Catsfield, Crowhurst, Penhurst, Sedlescombe, Telham and Whatlington, the five churches in Bexhill-on-Sea and those in the suburbs of Little Common and Sidley.

The Roman Catholic Diocese of Arundel and Brighton, whose cathedral is at Arundel, administers the district's six Roman Catholic churches. The churches at Battle, Bexhill-on-Sea, Little Common, Northiam (Horn's Cross) and Rye are all part of Eastbourne and St Leonards-on-Sea Deanery, as was the former church at Sidley. The church at Burwash is in Mayfield Deanery. Little Common is served as a Mass Centre from St Mary Magdalene's Church in Bexhill-on-Sea, as was Sidley until its closure. The churches at Battle and Northiam are part of a joint parish.

The Hastings, Bexhill and Rye Methodist Circuit, a 13-church administrative area, covers eight Methodist churches in Rother—at Battle, Bexhill-on-Sea (Christchurch, Little Common and Sackville Road), Brede (Trinity), Pett, Rye and Winchelsea.

The four United Reformed Churches in the district as of 2011, at Ashburnham, Bexhill-on-Sea, Robertsbridge, and Sedlescombe, were part of the West Kent and East Sussex Synod Area of the Church—a group of 32 churches within the Southern Synod region. Robertsbridge United Reformed Church was also in this area until its closure in 2015, and Ashburnham Chapel closed in 2013 but remains in use as a non-denominational church.

Of the five extant Baptist churches in the district, four are administratively part of the East Sussex Network of the South Eastern Baptist Association: the churches at Battle, Rye and Sidley, and Beulah Baptist Church in Bexhill-on-Sea. The former Bethel Strict Baptist Chapel at Rye, which closed in 2018, was affiliated with the Gospel Standard movement.

== Listed status ==
English Heritage has awarded listed status to more than 50 current and former church buildings in Rother. A building is defined as "listed" when it is placed on a statutory register of buildings of "special architectural or historic interest" in accordance with the Planning (Listed Buildings and Conservation Areas) Act 1990. The Department for Culture, Media and Sport, a Government department, is responsible for this; English Heritage, a non-departmental public body, acts as an agency of the department to administer the process and advise the department on relevant issues. There are three grades of listing status. Grade I, the highest, is defined as being of "exceptional interest"; Grade II* is used for "particularly important buildings of more than special interest"; and Grade II, the lowest, is used for buildings of "special interest". As of February 2001, there were 40 Grade I-listed buildings, 75 with Grade II* status and 1,991 Grade II-listed buildings in Rother.

== Current places of worship ==
Current places of worship
Name	Image	Location'	Denomination/ Affiliation	Grade	Notes	Refs
St Peter's Church (More images)		Ashburnham; 50.9057°N 0.4016°E	Anglican	I	The Earls of Ashburnham built Ashburnham Place and this church on their estate in the 15th century. Only the castellated Perpendicular Gothic tower survives from that era: the 1st Baron Ashburnham's wholesale rebuilding of 1665, in sandstone to harmonise with the other buildings, gave the church its present appearance.	
St Mary the Virgin Church (More images)		Battle; 50.9151°N 0.4885°E	Anglican	I	Founded by an abbot from the adjacent abbey early in the 12th century, Battle's large church was extensively rebuilt in the next three centuries in the Decorated and Perpendicular Gothic styles. The main feature of the "really splendid church" is its long five-bay nave.	
Zion Chapel (More images)		Battle; 50.9183°N 0.4843°E	Baptist	II	The town's first Baptist chapel (Vidler's Chapel) was built in 1798. Some members seceded in 1820 and founded their own chapel next door; it survives, unlike its predecessor. A stuccoed Neoclassical three-window façade, with a pediment, buttresses and gabled porch, contrasts with the red-brick side walls. The chapel was registered for marriages in December 1851.	
Emmanuel Centre (Battle Methodist Church) (More images)		Battle; 50.9134°N 0.4994°E	Methodist	–	Battle's original Methodist chapel dated from 1826. The congregation moved to this new, much larger building—a combined church and community centre—in 2014, and it was registered for marriages in June of that year. Construction work started in March 2013 and the building opened just under a year later. Worship took place in a room at a nearby pub between November 2011, when the old chapel closed, and 2014. The new building, whose main worship space seats 150 people, was designed by Pinelog Ltd, a firm specialising in glulam timber buildings. The church is in the Hastings, Bexhill and Rye Methodist Circuit.	
Church of Our Lady Immaculate and St Michael (More images)		Battle; 50.9182°N 0.4841°E	Roman Catholic	–	Battle's Roman Catholic church was founded in 1882 by the 5th Earl of Ashburnham and built in 1886, probably to the Earl's own design. It hides behind the priest's house and is attached to a terrace of cottages. The red-brick building is Romanesque Revival/Italianate in style. The church was registered for marriages in September 1928.	
All Saints Church (More images)		Beckley; 50.9835°N 0.6239°E	Anglican	I	The "dominant" tower is partly 11th-century and has herringbone masonry typical of the Norman era. Aisles were built in the 13th and 14th centuries, and a south-side chapel was among many additions during the Victorian era. The nave roof has dormer windows.	
St Peter's Church (More images)		Bexhill-on-Sea; 50.8460°N 0.4789°E	Anglican	II*	King Offa's charter records the founding of a 40-by-20-foot (12.2 m × 6.1 m) church on this site on 15 August 772. The only remaining 8th-century feature is a preserved reliquary lid; the low, stocky tower of the late 11th century is the oldest part. Victorian restoration replaced the 13th-century chancel and added two bays to the nave.	
St Barnabas' Church (More images)		Bexhill-on-Sea; 50.8394°N 0.4775°E	Anglican	II	Arthur Blomfield designed this large Early English Gothic Revival flint church in 1890–91. Side aisles were added 17 years later, and Leslie Moore built a Lady chapel on the south side in 1939. The interior is brick-built. The land was donated by the 7th Earl de la Warr.	
St Michael and All Angels Church (More images)		Bexhill-on-Sea; 50.8470°N 0.4966°E	Anglican	–	This brick-built church, with a "pretty" tile-hung pyramidal spire, has served the Pebsham area in the east of the town since its consecration in October 1933. The foundation stone of John B. Mendham's Decorated Gothic Revival church was laid in 1929. The congregation funded and built a church hall in 1961.	
St Stephen's Church (More images)		Bexhill-on-Sea; 50.8496°N 0.4618°E	Anglican	–	The "Church on the Down" was designed by prolific local architect Henry Ward in 1898 and opened in 1900. It succeeded a mission hut at the foot of the hill, erected in 1885 by the incumbent at St Peter's Church. The tower, which lacks its planned spire, is Perpendicular Gothic Revival, but the rest of the brick building is Early English.	
Christchurch Methodist Church (More images)		Bexhill-on-Sea; 50.8517°N 0.4755°E	Methodist	–	Also known as Springfield Road Methodist Church, this superseded a small chapel at Haddocks Hill (1873–1920). The land was bought to prevent a pub being built on the site. Henry Harper designed the church in 1906, and services commenced in March 1907. Its marriage registration dates from January 1911. It is Perpendicular Gothic Revival in style, of red-brick with decorative pinnacles and gables.	
Sackville Road Methodist Church (More images)		Bexhill-on-Sea; 50.8395°N 0.4701°E	Methodist	–	Christchurch was originally a Primitive Methodist church; the Sackville Road building, completed in 1896 and registered for marriages in November 1897, served Wesleyan Methodists. The adjacent Parkhurst Hall, finished in 1892, served as a temporary chapel until the red-brick Gothic Revival church, designed by W.W. Pocock, was opened in July 1896.	
Living Word Church (More images)		Bexhill-on-Sea; 50.8442°N 0.4612°E	Assemblies of God	–	A tin tabernacle was built on this site in 1898 for Wesleyan Methodists. After it fell out of use, Plymouth Brethren acquired it and reregistered it for their use in 1935 with the name Bexhill Christian Assembly (an earlier name was Hamilton Hall). The metal structure was augmented by a brick extension in 1949, but eight years later the structure was found to be unsound and was partly demolished; a Reema construction prefabricated building replaced it, but the brick parts were retained. It was still used by a Brethren assembly in 2002, but is now an Assemblies of God Pentecostal church.	
Beulah Baptist Church (More images)		Bexhill-on-Sea; 50.8420°N 0.4740°E	Baptist	–	The Baptist cause came late to Bexhill: attempts by the church in Hastings to establish a congregation faltered in the 1870s, and only when Charles Spurgeon's widow became involved was progress made. She bought land on Clifford Road, commissioned Resta Moore to design a church and brought in the first pastor, who served for 30 years. Moore's Early English red-brick building of 1896–97 has a corner tower. It was registered for marriages in October 1898.	
Maitreya Buddhist Centre (More images)		Bexhill-on-Sea; 50.8408°N 0.4774°E	Buddhist	–	This venue opened in December 2005 in the centre of Bexhill, and offers meditation, courses relating to Buddhism and worship facilities. It follows the Kadampa tradition.	
St Paul's Free Church (More images)		Bexhill-on-Sea; 50.8393°N 0.4632°E	Evangelical	–	Now home to a Reformed Protestant Evangelical congregation, but originally associated with the Free Church of England, this church reopened in April 1963 after work was carried out to enlarge and improve the original timber church of 1924 and its attached hall. R. Burstow of St Leonards-on-Sea was the architect. A marriage licence was granted in September 1925 when the church was called St Paul's Evangelical Church.	
Kingdom Hall (More images)		Bexhill-on-Sea; 50.8408°N 0.4677°E	Jehovah's Witnesses	–	The town's original Kingdom Hall occupied part of a building in Station Road and was licensed for marriages between September 1956 and July 1982. From that month a new single-storey rendered building on Terminus Road (registered for worship in February 1983 and for marriages two years later) replaced it. This was in turn replaced by the present building on the same site in 2010. It serves the Little Common and Pebsham Congregations.	
Bexhill Masjid and Islamic Centre (More images)		Bexhill-on-Sea; 50.8414°N 0.4742°E	Muslim	–	Planning permission was granted in 2010 to convert part of a house in the town into a community centre for Bexhill Islamic Association, which had been founded eight years earlier. It was subsequently registered as a place of worship in 2019.	
Friends Meeting House (More images)		Bexhill-on-Sea; 50.8385°N 0.4732°E	Quaker	–	The catalyst for the founding of a Friends meeting house in Bexhill was a bus strike in 1957 which prevented local Quakers travelling to Eastbourne or Hastings. Houses and a hotel were used for worship at first, but in 1965 the congregation acquired land at 15A Albert Road (originally a Plymouth Brethren meeting room, built in 1959 for £8,000 to the design of local architect Roy E.G. Harrison) and the brick meeting house was completed in November of that year. Harrison also built an extension in 1969. The meeting house was not formally registered until February 1982.	
St Mary Magdalene's Church (More images)		Bexhill-on-Sea; 50.8414°N 0.4780°E	Roman Catholic	II	Arthur Young's design for Bexhill's Roman Catholic church, completed in 1907, uses Decorated and Perpendicular Gothic themes. The castellated tower is prominent, and the large stone building has side aisles and transepts. Contemporary reports described it as "practically a copy of Alfriston Church". A small chapel had been opened on the site in July 1893 and was registered for marriages in December 1897.	
Bexhill Christian Spiritualist Church (More images)		Bexhill-on-Sea; 50.8421°N 0.4686°E	Spiritualist	–	This congregation has moved to Victoria Road in Bexhill-on-Sea; originally it occupied part of a building in Station Road, which was registered for the solemnisation of marriages between June 1975 and January 1985. The present church was registered for worship in January 1985 and for marriages eight years later.	
Bexhill United Reformed Church (More images)		Bexhill-on-Sea; 50.8403°N 0.4842°E	United Reformed Church	–	This was originally a Presbyterian church; the cause was associated with St Columba's Church in St Leonards-on-Sea. Some members of its congregation moved to Bexhill and started meeting at a building in Station Road. The 8th Earl de la Warr provided land on Cantelupe Road, and G.H. Gray's Perpendicular Gothic Revival flint and stone church opened in 1901. It was originally registered for marriages in September 1902 as Presbyterian Hall; later names were St George's Presbyterian Church and St George's United Reformed Church.	
St Giles' Church (More images)		Bodiam; 51.0074°N 0.5392°E	Anglican	II*	This mostly 14th-century church is almost hidden in a wooded area north of the village and its castle. Richard Cromwell Carpenter undertook a thorough restoration in 1845–46, but the original Early English chancel and Perpendicular Gothic tower remain. Prominent exterior features include a steep catslide aisle roof and a 19th-century porch.	
St George's Church (More images)		Brede; 50.9349°N 0.5964°E	Anglican	I	Monks from Fécamp Abbey in Normandy founded a church on this site in 1180, but little 12th-century fabric remains: over the next 300 years north and south aisles, a new chancel and a battlemented tower were added, and the present appearance is entirely Perpendicular Gothic. The intricate tracery of the east window has continental European influences.	
St Thomas a Becket's Church (More images)		Brightling; 50.9639°N 0.3961°E	Anglican	I	This 13th-century church is famous for the gigantic pyramid in its churchyard: it houses the remains of the eccentric Squire of Brightling "Mad Jack" Fuller. The church is an Early English structure with a short castellated tower, Decorated Gothic windows and a mid-18th century gabled porch.	
Trinity Methodist Church (More images)		Broad Oak, Brede; 50.9487°N 0.6016°E	Methodist	II	This Early English-style chapel, built in 1855 for a Wesleyan Methodist congregation and registered with the name Wesleyan Chapel in April 1875, replaced an earlier place of worship opened in 1833. It is surrounded by a burial ground with gravestones dating back to 1845. The façade has a gable and pointed-arched windows and is stuccoed. The roof has slate tiles.	
St Bartholomew's Church (More images)		Burwash; 50.9977°N 0.3887°E	Anglican	II*	The thick-walled tower survives from the original church, built in 1090. Most of the structure was reconstructed in 1856: the chancel was completely renewed, although its 13th-century arch survives. In the south aisle, a 14th-century cast-iron memorial slab is the oldest in England; Burwash was a centre of the Wealden iron industry.	
Church of Christ the King (More images)		Burwash; 50.9975°N 0.3814°E	Roman Catholic	–	A Roman Catholic church dedicated to St Joseph stood outside the village from 1887 until 1989; in about 1968, the small brick and concrete Church of Christ the King was built in a more central position. It was formally registered for worship and for marriages in May 1980. The "modest" structure has an apsidal sanctuary and dalle de verre windows designed at Buckfast Abbey.	
St Philip's Church (More images)		Burwash Common; 50.9889°N 0.3350°E	Anglican	–	Described as "a serious job" by Nikolaus Pevsner, this stone church dates from 1867 and was designed by the partnership of William Slater and Richard Herbert Carpenter. It was their only newly built church, but they were prolific church restorers. There are lancet windows, a bellcote and a vaulted apse.	
St Thomas the Apostle's Church (More images)		Camber; 50.9366°N 0.7948°E	Anglican	–	In 1944, a flying bomb demolished the chapel of ease to East Guldeford church which had served the small seaside resort of Camber since 1906. The new church, a "nice and neat", early-20th-century style brick building with weatherboarding and tile-hanging, was designed by L. Keir Hett. Many fittings were retrieved from the old church.	
St Laurence's Church (More images)		Catsfield; 50.8939°N 0.4565°E	Anglican	II*	Catsfield's "humble" and ancient Anglican church, outside the village next to the manor house, contrasts with the centrally placed former Methodist church, whose huge spire dominates the village. St Laurence's nave is 10th- and 11th-century, with early Norman herringbone masonry, but the north aisle is an 1845 addition by Richard Cromwell Carpenter.	
St Nicholas' Church (More images)		Cliff End, Pett; 50.8894°N 0.6869°E	Anglican	–	This tiny building was erected by the Admiralty at this coastal location as a Lifesaving Rocket Apparatus Station—a safety device intended to rescue shipwrecked sailors. It was bought by the Diocese of Chichester and opened as a church on 26 April 1935. The whitewashed structure has a timber porch dating from 1959.	
St Augustine's Church (More images)		Cooden, Bexhill-on-Sea; 50.8373°N 0.4558°E	Anglican	–	William H. Randoll Blacking's red-brick, Free-style Gothic Revival church was extended between 1960 and 1963 by H. Hubbard Ford and consecrated in May 1963. It occupies a spacious site surrounded by houses built for retired clergy, erected in 1957. John Skelton provided a sculpture of St Augustine which stands in a niche above the door.	
St George's Church (More images)		Crowhurst; 50.8838°N 0.4969°E	Anglican	I	William Milford Teulon, brother of the better-known architect Samuel Sanders Teulon, redesigned the church in a 13th-/14th-century Gothic style in 1856, but the short, substantial 15th-century tower and its Perpendicular Gothic window remain. A yew tree in the churchyard is apparently the oldest and largest in Sussex.	
Crowhurst Chapel (More images)		Crowhurst; 50.8787°N 0.4993°E	Assemblies of God	–	This red-brick gabled chapel was built in 1884 for a Wesleyan Methodist congregation. It was still in use by Methodists until 1990, but in September 1991 it was re-registered for a Pentecostal group called the Crowhurst Chapel Fellowship. It is part of the Assemblies of God denomination.	
Crowhurst Christian Healing Centre (More images)		Crowhurst; 50.8898°N 0.5025°E	Non-denominational	–	This was founded in 1928 at the village's old rectory. Daily worship and prayer services are open to the public, and the venue is also available as a spiritual retreat.	
St Giles' Church (More images)		Dallington; 50.9471°N 0.3586°E	Anglican	II*	The original dedication was to St Margaret; the change apparently came in the 17th century. As at Crowhurst, a mid-19th-century Gothic Revival nave and chancel has been matched to a 15th-century Perpendicular Gothic tower. The original building, of which nothing survives, was 13th-century. The stone spire is one of three in Sussex.	
St Mary's Church (More images)		East Guldeford; 50.9609°N 0.7567°E	Anglican	II*	A church of unusual design—more in common with Kentish churches than those of Sussex, and with a double hipped roof giving a "hunchback appearance"—this was founded in 1499 and consecrated six years later. There is no chancel arch: an elaborate roof beam marks the division between nave and chancel instead. The windows have an early-19th-century appearance.	
Church of the Assumption and St Nicolas (More images)		Etchingham; 51.0096°N 0.4413°E	Anglican	I	Largely unaltered since the 1360s, when it was built in the Decorated style to a French architect's design, Etchingham's "large and proud" parish church has a central tower and a tall interior. The nave is short and has a high clerestory; the chancel is somewhat longer and has windows with elaborate tracery.	
St James's Church (More images)		Ewhurst Green; 50.9925°N 0.5572°E	Anglican	I	The ironstone tower, with an "ungainly" two-pitched, sugarloaf-shaped spire which looks twisted from some angles, is 12th-century, but most other parts of this ridge-top church are two centuries newer. The nave was made higher at that time, and the 14th-century king post roof survives.	
St Andrew's Church (More images)		Fairlight; 50.8769°N 0.6425°E	Anglican	II	London-based architect Thomas Little's only Sussex church, built in 1845, replaced a smaller building on the same site. The tall square buttressed tower, whose top is 618 feet (188 m) above sea level in this clifftop village, is a landmark for ships. The church is Early English Gothic Revival in style with paired lancet windows in the chancel.	
St Peter's Church (More images)		Fairlight Cove; 50.8779°N 0.6630°E	Anglican	–	Serving the seaside village of Fairlight Cove, this modest timber-built square structure was erected in 1970 at the request of residents and the Sussex Churches Campaign. A cross on the roof identifies its ecclesiastical purpose.	
St Augustine of Canterbury's Church (More images)		Flimwell; 51.0514°N 0.4592°E	Anglican	II	Decimus Burton's stone church of 1839 was extended in 1879, when the chancel was added. The Perpendicular Gothic Revival building has a spire-topped tower at one end, lancet windows in the nave, 19th-century tiled murals and a hammerbeam roof.	
Beckley Full Gospel Mission (More images)		Four Oaks, Beckley; 50.9838°N 0.6516°E	Assemblies of God	–	This building houses as Assemblies of God Pentecostal congregation and holds several services a week. It was registered for worship in May 1956 and for marriages the following June.	
St Laurence's Church (More images)		Guestling Green; 50.9000°N 0.6375°E	Anglican	I	This isolated church took shape between the 11th and 14th centuries, but the interior had to be restored in 1890 because of fire damage. An entrance porch was added to the tower around this time. Aisles were added to the nave in the 12th and 14th centuries; the older north aisle has a contemporary side-chapel with intricately carved arches.	
St Theresa of Lisieux Church		Horns Cross, Northiam; 50.9657°N 0.5961°E	Roman Catholic	–	Writer and Roman Catholic convert Sheila Kaye-Smith, who lived here, gave the land for the church, which was built in the Vernacular style in 1935. It has flat-arched windows and a red-brick porch. Inside is a "delightful carved stone relief" by Joseph Cribb of The Guild of St Joseph and St Dominic. The church was registered for marriages in December 1936.	
Holy Trinity Church (More images)		Hurst Green; 51.0202°N 0.4691°E	Anglican	–	This red-brick church lacks a tower or steeple; instead there is a two-stage bellcote at the west end of the roof. The Early English Gothic Revival building by Lacy W. Ridge also has some stone dressings, one transept and lancet windows.	
All Saints Church (More images)		Icklesham; 50.9171°N 0.6739°E	Anglican	I	A large, "surprisingly grand", "interesting" and ancient church at the edge of a long village, All Saints has Saxon origins and retains much early Norman fabric. Alongside the long chancel is a substantial chapel dedicated to St Nicholas. Samuel Sanders Teulon undertook light restoration in the 19th century.	
All Saints Church (More images)		Iden; 50.9813°N 0.7275°E	Anglican	I	Extensions to the Norman church took place between the 13th and 15th centuries, giving the building a Perpendicular Gothic appearance. The original south aisle has been lost, but the blocked arcade remains; a former priest's door, also blocked, is traceable on the outside wall. The prominent tower has a stair-turret and a single window from the Norman era.	
St Mark's Church (More images)		Little Common, Bexhill-on-Sea; 50.8458°N 0.4372°E	Anglican	–	A Martello tower at Bulverhythe was demolished in 1842, and rubble from it was used to build St Mark's Church on a site given by the owner of Battle Abbey. Henry Woodyer added the chancel in 1857 and a south aisle in 1883; another was built on the north side in 1962. The stone building has lancet windows.	
Little Common Methodist Church (More images)		Little Common, Bexhill-on-Sea; 50.8444°N 0.4348°E	Methodist	–	Turf Chapel (1837)—the original Methodist chapel in this area of Bexhill—and another chapel on Chandler Road were sold to fund the purchase of a new site for a larger church in 1915. After a hiatus caused by World War I, construction started in 1926 and the new church opened in July of that year. C.F. Callow's red-brick building was augmented by a church hall in 1953 and an extension in 1964. It was registered for marriages in June 1928.	
St Martha's Church (More images)		Little Common, Bexhill-on-Sea; 50.8433°N 0.4342°E	Roman Catholic	–	Founded in 1939 and finished in 1940, Little Common's Roman Catholic church is a red-brick structure whose distinctive west-end façade combines a Mediterranean-style Romanesque Revival tower with a low timber cap-style spire in the Sussex Vernacular style. Local architect Marshall Wood was responsible. It was registered for worship in July 1947 and for marriages two months later.	
All Saints Church (More images)		Mountfield; 50.9558°N 0.4686°E	Anglican	II*	Dominated by a sturdy, heavily buttressed tower with a low-set broach spire, this Early English church retains some Norman-era fabric: there has been a church on this site since the 12th century. Some medieval wall paintings survive, although badly faded. The timber entrance porch on the south side was added in the 14th century. A lychgate was erected in 1912.	
St John's Church (More images)		Netherfield; 50.9404°N 0.4513°E	Anglican	II*	Samuel Sanders Teulon designed this church in 1859 to serve the hamlet of Netherfield in Battle parish. It is an Early English Gothic Revival stone building "without any of Teulon's perversities": the architect was a controversial and idiosyncratic exponent of the Gothic Revival style. He also designed the pulpit and reredos—the latter a "spiky" and distinctive piece.	
St Mary's Church (More images)		Northiam; 50.9910°N 0.6063°E	Anglican	II*	Surrounded by ancient walls and cottages, this church is somewhat hidden behind its tall spire-topped tower, which is the oldest surviving part and retains Norman (and possibly Saxon) work. The rest of the church was rebuilt in 1836, and in 1845–46 a large chapel-cum-mausoleum was added by Sydney Smirke for the Frewen family.	
St Peter and St Paul's Church (More images)		Peasmarsh; 50.9652°N 0.6862°E	Anglican	I	Standing about a mile from its village—leading to claims that the settlement moved away from its original position for reasons such as the Black Death or the marshiness of the surrounding land—this Norman church had aisles added in the Early English style later. The Transitional Norman tower dates from 1170.	
St Michael's Church (More images)		Penhurst; 50.9236°N 0.4093°E	Anglican	I	Only modest restoration has taken place at this isolated church, part of a centuries-old group with the neighbouring manor house and farm. The tower, with a large window and a pyramidal cap, is Perpendicular Gothic. The interior fittings are of high quality; some date back to the 15th century.	
St Mary and St Peter's Church (More images)		Pett; 50.8944°N 0.6616°E	Anglican	–	Benjamin Ferrey's Decorated Gothic Revival stone church of 1864 replaced an older building on the site. The building, which cost £2,000, was dismissed as "dull" by Nikolaus Pevsner, who also commented on the "curious" treatment of the tower: its shape gradually changes from square to octagonal.	
Pett Methodist Chapel (More images)		Pett; 50.8947°N 0.6576°E	Methodist	II	Built as the Mount Calvary Bible Christian Chapel in 1848, this red-brick building still serves Methodists as part of the Hastings, Bexhill and Rye Methodist Circuit. It sits in a small graveyard, reduced in size by an extension built in 1956. The façade has a porch, three bays and a gable. Although the chapel was reregistered in 1960, its original marriage registration (under the name Mount Calvary) dates from February 1852.	
St Michael's Church (More images)		Playden; 50.9625°N 0.7331°E	Anglican	I	Dominated by its axial tower (placed between the nave and chancel) with a very tall, "elegant" broach spire—a later addition—this church is almost exclusively early-13th-century. The spire requires intricate internal timber framing to support it; similarly, distinctive triangular buttresses provide structural support to the aisles.	
Ashburnham Chapel (More images)		Ponts Green, Ashburnham; 50.9166°N 0.3879°E	Non-denominational	–	This red-brick building dates from 1866. When the former Congregational chapel between Dallington and Ashburnham was closed, it was converted into a chapel for that denomination and was registered accordingly in July 1965. It was then part of the United Reformed Church until 31 December 2013, and has since left that denomination and become an independent chapel.	
Robertsbridge Mission Room (More images)		Robertsbridge; 50.9857°N 0.4754°E	Anglican	–	Robertsbridge, the largest village in Salehurst parish, lacked its own Anglican place of worship until 1904, when this "featureless brick building" was erected. Its exterior is now painted with whitewash. Construction cost £1,420.	
St Mary's Church (More images)		Rye; 50.9501°N 0.7342°E	Anglican	I	This large cruciform building, founded by monks from Fécamp Abbey, has considerable Norman work dating from its main period of construction (1150–1180). Side chapels were added in the 13th century. French raiders caused much damage in 1377, and other changes were made in the 17th century and the 1880s.	
Rye Baptist Church (More images)		Rye; 50.9519°N 0.7321°E	Baptist	–	Baptists who formerly worshipped at the former chapel on Mermaid Street and the Independent Chapel on Landgate moved to this new Perpendicular Gothic Revival building on Cinque Ports Street. It is mostly stone-built, and was founded on 25 May 1909. Its marriage registration dates from April 1910.	
Kingdom Hall (More images)		Rye; 50.9471°N 0.7353°E	Jehovah's Witnesses	–	Jehovah's Witnesses of the Rye Congregation first worshipped in Rye in the 1950s: their original meeting place on Eagle Road was registered in October 1952. They moved to the present Kingdom Hall on Rye Harbour Road in the 1970s and registered it in 1981, and later built a new Kingdom Hall on the same site (registered in July 2006). Congregations typically exceed 100.	
Rye Methodist Church (More images)		Rye; 50.9498°N 0.7349°E	Methodist	–	John Wesley founded Rye's first Methodist chapel in 1789. Altered in 1814 and again in 1852 (in Renaissance Revival style), it was destroyed by World War II bombs. The adjacent Sunday School of 1901 survived and was converted into a new church, which was opened in August 1954 and registered the following month. The original chapel had been registered for marriages in February 1845.	
St Anthony of Padua's Church (More images)		Rye; 50.9492°N 0.7329°E	Roman Catholic	II	St Walburga's Church, a red-brick church of 1900, was rededicated and redesigned in 1927–29 by John B. Mendham as an "unusual ... self-conscious essay in early Lombardic Romanesque". The lower stage of the façade is an arched loggia, and there is a gable and bell-tower above. An octagonal dome at the rear is visible from the east. The church is served by members of the adjacent Friary. The church was registered for marriages in January 1930.	
Church of the Holy Spirit (More images)		Rye Harbour; 50.9388°N 0.7568°E	Anglican	II	Gothic Revival architect Samuel Sanders Teulon designed this church in 1848–49 and was responsible for some of its interior fittings. C. Spooner extended it in 1912. It is Early English in style, with an apsidal end, lancet windows and an octagonal tower with a porch in the base. The Mary Stanford lifeboat disaster of 1928 is commemorated by a memorial.	
St Mary the Virgin Church (More images)		Salehurst; 50.9910°N 0.4912°E	Anglican	I	The size of this church in relation to the modest hamlet it serves reflects its founding by the monks of nearby Robertsbridge Abbey and the enormous parish it originally served: places as distant as Bodiam and Etchingham were apparently within Salehurst's control. The building dates from about 1250, although there is a mid-14th-century timber-framed porch. The tall tower is supported by buttresses.	
St John the Baptist's Church (More images)		Sedlescombe; 50.9413°N 0.5281°E	Anglican	II	The present building may be the third on the site, at the north end of the village: a timber Saxon church is believed to have existed before the Norman building which was almost totally replaced between the 15th and 19th centuries (extensive restoration took place between 1866 and 1874).	
Sedlescombe United Reformed Church (More images)		Sedlescombe; 50.9277°N 0.5368°E	United Reformed Church	–	Attributed to local architect Henry Ward and built in 1879 as a Congregational chapel, this was founded by Rev. Charles New of the Robertson Street church in Hastings—the first of several he established in the surrounding villages. John Catt built the red-brick and terracotta chapel, which has a large rose window. It was registered with the name The Mission Hall in September 1906; a later name was Chapel Hill Church.	
All Saints Church (More images)		Sidley; 50.8565°N 0.4679°E	Anglican	II	Both T.E.C. and G.E.S. Streatfield contributed to Sidley's parish church: the former designed the nave, which opened for worship in October 1909, and the latter added the chancel and stocky tower between 1927 and 1930. The style is Gothic Revival with Arts and Crafts elements. It replaced a tin tabernacle of 1885.	
Sidley Baptist Church (More images)		Sidley; 50.8573°N 0.4708°E	Baptist	–	The present building dates from 1956, but Beulah Baptist Church founded a chapel in Sidley in 1907 in a former Methodist chapel. A new tin tabernacle called Haddon Hall superseded this in 1913. W. Howell Lewis's new church, next to the 1913 building, opened in February 1957 and was registered for worship in that month; a licence for solemnising marriages followed a year later.	
St Mark's Church (More images)		Staplecross; 50.9743°N 0.5397°E	Anglican	–	An "unpretentious mission church" to St James's Church at Ewhurst Green, this red-brick building was opened on 24 May 1894. The land had been donated by Thomas Chester Daws in 1873, but work did not begin until 1891. It has lancet windows and a bellcote with a bell installed in 2009.	
St Peter's Church (More images)		Stonegate; 51.0303°N 0.3748°E	Anglican	II	George Courthorpe founded the village's original church in 1838; this now forms the chancel of the present building, an Early English Gothic Revival design with Arts and Crafts elements and a large, distinctive tower with weatherboarding, timber framing, a small spire and a clock. G.E.S. Streatfield executed the design in 1904.	
Church of the Ascension		Telham; 50.9008°N 0.5188°E	Anglican	–	Within the parish of Battle, this Anglican church was built alongside the Battle–Hastings road in the hamlet of Telham in 1876. It is a red-brick Gothic Revival structure in the Early English style, with a miniature spire on the roof.	
St Mary's Church (More images)		Ticehurst; 51.0454°N 0.4078°E	Anglican	II*	Ticehurst was a centre of the Wealden iron industry by the 14th century, when this large, prominently situated church was built. It is set in an extensive churchyard with gravestones dating back to the 17th century. The spire-topped tower has a large internal arch, and various medieval fittings survive inside.	
Compass Park Gospel Hall		Udiam, Staplecross; 50.9865°N 0.5202°E	Plymouth Brethren Christian Church	–	Planning permission was sought in 2009 to build a Brethren meeting room on this site off the B2244 road as part of a small development of industrial units. It was in use by April 2019 and was registered for marriages in March 2020.	
St Mary's Church (More images)		Udimore; 50.9400°N 0.6509°E	Anglican	I	The nave of this isolated church, serving a tiny hamlet, is Norman; parts may be 11th-century. It originally had two bays, but a third was added slightly later at the west end. A south aisle was also built later, but it has now disappeared, leaving traces of its arcade on the wall. The tower is low and heavily buttressed.	
St John the Baptist's Church (More images)		Westfield; 50.9080°N 0.5729°E	Anglican	I	"Beautifully proportioned" despite the large number of buttresses supporting the nave and tower walls, this 12th-century church stands at the southern entrance to the large village of Westfield. Lancet windows were added to the chancel in the 13th century, and Victorian architect Charles Edward Davis built a north aisle in 1860.	
Sanctuary of Christ the Holy Redeemer (More images)		Westfield; 50.9193°N 0.5778°E	Non-denominational	–	As well as offering two public services each week, this venue offers counselling, healing, a large baptistery with free-flowing water, guest accommodation and a rehabilitation room. It was registered for worship and for marriages in March 1975.	
St Mary Magdalen's Church (More images)		Whatlington; 50.9366°N 0.5043°E	Anglican	II*	This small, "odd-looking" Early English church had a spire-topped tower and apse-ended vestry added in 1862, replacing the original tower at the west end. The rest of the building is mostly 13th-century; a Saxon church on the site may have been destroyed when the Battle of Hastings took place nearby. A fire in July 2010 wrecked the building.	
St Thomas the Martyr's Church (More images)		Winchelsea; 50.9242°N 0.7092°E	Anglican	I	Built in the 13th century on a gigantic scale, the church was "the finest example of the Decorated style in Sussex"; but in the 1360s it was partly destroyed by invaders from France, and the present building consists of the original chancel only. A large tower, possibly intended as a watch-tower, was demolished in 1790. The large windows have modern stained glass.	
St Richard's Church (More images)		Winchelsea Beach; 50.9155°N 0.7240°E	Anglican	–	Phyllis Biddle, a former missionary, funded this new church in the seaside resort of Winchelsea Beach. It was built in 1962, mostly of red brick; other architectural features include elm weatherboarding, a tower with panelled piers and a Rhenish helm cap, and a tiled roof.	

== Former places of worship ==
Former places of worship
Name	Image	Location	Denomination/ Affiliation	Grade	Notes	Refs
Ashburnham Congregational Mission Chapel (More images)		Ashburnham; 50.9321°N 0.3734°E	Congregational	II	Standing on a remote lane between Dallington and Ashburnham, this Vernacular two-storey cottage-style building dates from about 1849. It has red and grey brickwork, a three-window range and a hipped roof of slate. A side wall has two arched windows. It became a house after its closure in 1964 and subsequent deregistration as a place of worship.	
Battle Congregational Church (More images)		Battle; 50.9170°N 0.4843°E	Congregational	–	Standing on the High Street and now in commercial use, this Renaissance Revival-style building was designed by 1881 by prolific local architect Thomas Elworthy. It was one of several Nonconformist chapels in Battle in the 19th century. The walls are of red brick with some terracotta. The church was closed and deregistered for worship in November 1972, 88 years after it was registered.	
Kingdom Hall (More images)		Battle; 50.9160°N 0.4858°E	Jehovah's Witnesses	–	This Kingdom Hall occupied part of a building to the rear of Battle High Street. It was used by the Battle Congregation of Jehovah's Witnesses, but they now share a Kingdom Hall at Bexhill-on-Sea with the Bexhill Congregation. The building's registration for worship was cancelled in May 2014.	
Battle Methodist Church (More images)		Battle; 50.9114°N 0.4922°E	Methodist	II	Erected in 1826, this stucco-clad building has changed little since, except for the addition of a porch in 1887. There is a central pediment flanked and topped by decorative finials, and the windows are set in pointed arches. It was used for worship until November 2011 and was subsequently converted into a house in 2014. In the same year, the congregation moved to the new Emmanuel Centre elsewhere in the village; between these times, services had taken place in a room at a nearby pub.	
Little Church of St Francis (More images)		Battle; 50.9158°N 0.4842°E	Spiritualist	–	This Spiritualist church, which was registered for marriages in November 2000, occupied part of a building behind Battle High Street.	
Beckley Methodist Chapel (More images)		Beckley; 50.9852°N 0.6368°E	Methodist	II	A Wesleyan chapel existed here in 1814, according to census records, but this red-brick building dates from 1840. It has a gabled porch and lancet windows, and the interior was galleried. It was still open in 1999, but the former congregation has now joined Trinity Methodist Church at Broad Oak. It was registered for marriages with the name Beckley Wesleyan Chapel in September 1888.	
Mission Church of the Good Shepherd (More images)		Bexhill-on-Sea; 50.8459°N 0.4686°E	Anglican	–	The Malet Memorial Hall (1912–13, commemorating Edward Malet) occupied the ground floor of this building; upstairs was the small mission church, which replaced a hut nearby. It has Tudor Revival elements. It opened in 1913 and survived until after 1971.	
St Andrew's Church (More images)		Bexhill-on-Sea; 50.8401°N 0.4682°E	Anglican	–	Always a chapel of ease—originally to St Barnabas' Church, then within the Bexhill Team Ministry—this cobbled flint and stone church was built in 1899–1900 to Joseph Wall's design. Extensions were built in 1912, 1955 and 1971. The arcaded interior is of red brick. Financial problems led to its closure after a final service on 8 January 2012. A planning application to demolish the redundant church in favour of flats was rejected in March 2017.	
Victoria Hall Congregational Church		Bexhill-on-Sea; 50.8419°N 0.4692°E	Congregational	–	Victoria Hall was built in 1887 as a multi-purpose building. Its name commemorated the Golden Jubilee of Queen Victoria. In 1887 John Stewart, a Congregationalist who during the previous year had erected a marquee in the grounds of his house and used it for outdoor services, bought the building and the surrounding land and converted it into a chapel. It was registered for marriages in May 1889, but this registration was cancelled when the new St John's Congregational Church was built on the vacant land to the east in 1898. Thereafter it was used as the church hall.	
Belle Hill Methodist Chapel (More images)		Bexhill-on-Sea; 50.8464°N 0.4718°E	Methodist	–	This Classical-style arch-windowed building, with stuccoed walls and an entrance porch, was erected in 1825 for the town's first Wesleyan Methodists. Ministers travelled from Hastings. It was registered for marriages between March 1894 and May 1938; in the latter year its congregation joined Christchurch Methodist Church, and a nursery school was later opened in the premises. In 1962 it was temporarily used as a place of worship again, by Plymouth Brethren, whose mid-19th-century meeting room nearby had been demolished.	
London Road Citadel (More images)		Bexhill-on-Sea; 50.8443°N 0.4692°E	Salvation Army	–	The Salvation Army founded a corps in Bexhill in 1892. For the next 22 years, they worshipped in various buildings and sometimes outdoors, but in 1914 they built a permanent place of worship on London Road. Former Mayor Viscount Hyde laid the first stone. It was registered for marriages in March 1942. The last service was held on 24 September 2006.	
St John's Church (More images)		Bexhill-on-Sea; 50.8419°N 0.4694°E	United Reformed Church	–	Henry Ward designed this red-brick and stone Perpendicular Gothic Revival church in 1897 to succeed Victoria Hall, whose registration for worship and for marriages it replaced in December 1898. It closed in 2007 and worshippers moved to St George's Church, the town's other United Reformed church. Demolition was threatened, but in 2009 the building was saved, with the intention of converting it into a youth centre.	
Providence Strict Baptist Chapel		Burwash; 50.9970°N 0.3853°E	Baptist	–	Founded in 1829 as a Calvinistic chapel by Joseph Buss, a former member of the village's Independent chapel, and completed the following year, this brick building was used for Strict Baptist worship until 1944, after which it was converted into a house called Chant Meadow. Little trace of its earlier appearance as a place of worship survives. Members of an earlier, long-closed Baptist chapel in the village founded the chapel at Shover's Green.	
Catsfield Methodist Church (More images)		Catsfield; 50.8970°N 0.4515°E	Methodist	II	Henry Blackman's distinctive Early English/Perpendicular Gothic Revival church of 1912 has a "disproportionately tall" spire on top of its tower, which also has an elaborately vaulted porch in its lower stage. Blackman paid for its construction himself at a cost of £4,000; the church is a memorial to his parents. Falling congregations made it unviable in the 1990s, and it was converted for residential use around the end of that decade. It was registered for marriages (under the name Blackman Memorial Methodist Church) between May 1915 and October 1991.	
Bethlehem Strict Baptist Chapel (More images)		Dallington; 50.9504°N 0.3820°E	Baptist	–	This small weatherboarded and timber-framed chapel, which closed after 1988 and is now in residential use, is outside the village on the Battle–Heathfield road. The roof has slate tiles. The cause was founded in a house in 1851. The chapel was registered for marriages in January 1937.	
Dallington Calvinistic Methodist Chapel (More images)		Dallington; 50.9512°N 0.3532°E	Methodist	–	Also on the Battle–Heathfield road, at Carrick's Hill in the west of the parish, the "Chapel in the Valley" was in use until 1989, when it was sold for residential conversion. It is a wooden structure with bargeboards.	
Etchingham Methodist Chapel (More images)		Etchingham; 51.0088°N 0.4376°E	Methodist	–	This has been altered substantially since its conversion into a house, but for most of the 20th century it served Methodists in Etchingham village. The red-brick chapel was completed in 1900, registered for marriages in 1904 and deregistered in 1970.	
Ewhurst Congregational Chapel (More images)		Ewhurst Green; 50.9928°N 0.5558°E	Congregational	II	Now a pair of cottages, this building was constructed in the 18th century as a single house. In 1895, half the building became a chapel. The walls are a combination of brick and ashlar. There is a three-window range; a new window and some buttresses were inserted in place of the chapel's door.	
Providence Strict Baptist Chapel (More images)		Flimwell; 51.0550°N 0.4401°E	Baptist	–	The first chapel in this village was an 1820s weatherboarded structure attached to a shop. The present chapel, closed in the 1970s, dates from 1902 and has a three-lancet window façade with a porch below and a date-stone above. The first service was held on 11 November 1902, and the chapel was registered for marriages six years later.	
Guestling Gospel Hall (More images)		Guestling; 50.8921°N 0.6358°E	Open Brethren	–	This was latterly known as Guestling Chapel. Under this name, the building on Chapel Lane in Guestling was deregistered as a place of worship in March 1995.	
Hollingrove Congregational Chapel (More images)		Hollingrove; 50.9625°N 0.4073°E	Congregational	–	This chapel was erected on a site next to a thatch-roofed cottage (subsequently demolished) in the hamlet of Hollingrove in Brightling parish. By the 1980s it had been sold and converted into a house. It was designed in 1909 by Henry Ward, and has a distinctive curved gable on the façade.	
Church of Our Lady Help of Christians (More images)		Hurst Green; 51.0175°N 0.4676°E	Roman Catholic	–	Francis Pollen, who later designed the church at Worth Abbey, was commissioned in 1959 to provide this church. The site was donated by Lord Longford. The Modernist polygonal building was closed in 2008 after suffering structural defects, and its registration (granted in July 1963) was cancelled in August of that year. Villagers have attempted to turn the empty church into a shop or community facility.	
Iden Methodist Church (More images)		Iden; 50.9817°N 0.7314°E	Methodist	–	The village's first Wesleyan Methodist chapel was destroyed by bombing in World War II. This new chapel stood in a more central location, and was used until the 1960s. Its marriage registration was formally cancelled in March 1971.	
Mountfield Methodist Chapel (More images)		Mountfield; 50.9513°N 0.4793°E	Methodist	–	Built in 1894, registered for marriages in 1930 and open for worship until 1970, this Free-style red-brick chapel is distinguished by its crow-stepped gable. The façade has a porch and some stonework. After its closure it was sold for residential conversion.	
Pevensey Sluice Mission Hall		Normans Bay; 50.8266°N 0.3948°E	Non-denominational	–	A Wesleyan Methodist chapel existed here by 1836, when it was identified as part of the Hastings Circuit. In or around 1886 it assumed the character of a nondenominational mission hall, and was run by Sarah Matthews—wife of a local coastguard officer. The building was sold for residential conversion in 1965.	
Northiam Wesleyan Chapel (More images)		Northiam; 50.9943°N 0.5997°E	Methodist	–	The façade of this 1814 chapel has been completely changed since its conversion to a combined commercial and residential building in 1974: its arched windows and doorway have been lost. The pediment and its oval date-stone survive, though. The side walls are partly tile-hung. The chapel was registered for marriages between November 1891 and December 1975.	
Northiam Unitarian Chapel (More images)		Northiam; 50.9957°N 0.5976°E	Unitarian	II	William Vidler, founder of a Baptist chapel at Battle, extended his influence to Northiam in 1795 when a timber-framed structure was turned into a chapel. It collapsed 15 years later, and the present building (closed in the early 21st century) was erected on the site. The mansard-roofed red-brick building has lancet windows and an arched entrance. It became Unitarian early in the 19th century.	
Peasmarsh Methodist Chapel (More images)		Peasmarsh; 50.9736°N 0.6879°E	Methodist	–	A chapel of 1842 was replaced in 1900 by this Early English Gothic Revival building of red brick with some stonework. It was registered for marriages between March 1906 and December 1996.	
Bethel Strict Baptist Chapel (More images)		Robertsbridge; 50.9861°N 0.4748°E	Baptist	II	Nearly hidden from the High Street by other buildings, this "quaint old chapel" was founded by James Weller—a "somewhat remarkable man" who preached at chapels in Smarden (Kent) and Burwash before founding this place of worship in 1842. The first service was in January 1843. It became aligned to the Gospel Standard movement and was registered for marriages in August 1962, but the chapel closed around 1999. There are large windows with tracery and a small porch.	
Robertsbridge Wesleyan Chapel (More images)		Robertsbridge; 50.9857°N 0.4760°E	Methodist	–	John Wesley preached in Robertsbridge regularly in the late 18th century, and by 1812 a permanent chapel was in place. Extensions were built in 1842 and 1874—the latter added a Sunday School to the stuccoed building. Worshippers joined the nearby Congregational church in 1960, and the old chapel was converted into flats. The chapel was licensed for marriages between 1843 and 1959.	
Robertsbridge United Reformed Church (More images)		Robertsbridge; 50.9856°N 0.4747°E	United Reformed Church	II	"Rich and fruity", "truly horrible", "most dissolute" and "very Victorian" are among the descriptions of Thomas Elworthy's chapel of 1881, which stands out among ancient timber-framed buildings in the village centre. When some Congregationalists seceded from the local Wesleyan Methodist chapel, Rev. Charles New of Robertson Street Chapel in Hastings founded this chapel for them; the two churches maintained links for many years. It closed with effect from 5 September 2015 and was offered for sale at auction in March 2016.	
Congregational Independent Chapel (More images)		Rye; 50.9494°N 0.7326°E	Congregational	II	Founded in 1817 on Watchbell Street, this was used by Independent Baptists who later joined the church in Cinque Ports Street. The three-bay façade has red brickwork, round-headed windows and a canopied entrance. It fell out of use by 1902, when Henry James owned it. It has been in residential use for more than a century.	
Rye United Reformed Church (More images)		Rye; 50.9521°N 0.7344°E	United Reformed Church	–	This chapel was built for Rye's Congregational community in 1882 and was registered for marriages the following October. In 1973 it was sold and became Rye Community Centre; worshippers joined the town's Methodist church. The Early English-style building has red brickwork and terracotta.	
Augustianian Friary Chapel (More images)		Rye; 50.9518°N 0.7345°E	Pre-Reformation	II	This chapel to a vanished former friary stands on Conduit Hill and dates from about 1380. Between the early 1890s and 1903, the Salvation Army used it as a place of worship; after that they moved to a newly built citadel at Rope Walk, and the 14th-century stone building passed into commercial use. New windows were inserted in 1906.	
Carmelite Chapel (More images)		Rye; 50.9495°N 0.7339°E	Pre-Reformation	II	Now in residential use and known as The Old Stone House, this was the chapel of the Order of Friars Repentant of Jesus Christ, established in 1263. This Order soon declined, and the chapel went out of use in the 14th century after Rye was attacked by French invaders. The building was altered in 1869, but some 13th- and 14th-century windows survive.	
Rye Particular Baptist Chapel (More images)		Rye; 50.9498°N 0.7312°E	Baptist	II	Quakers established a meeting house on Mermaid Street in the 1700s, but by 1753 the crumbling building had been sold to Strict Baptists. They demolished it and erected the present building, which was in use as a chapel until 1910. The slate and tile roof has dormers, and the red-brick façade has three shallow-arched sash windows.	
Independent Chapel (More images)		Rye; 50.9544°N 0.7358°E	Independent	–	This small chapel was established on Landgate in 1844. It closed in the early 1900s when the congregation, who had adopted Baptist views, joined the newly built church on Cinque Ports Street.	
Rye Citadel (More images)		Rye; 50.9528°N 0.7334°E	Salvation Army	–	After using the former Augustinian Friary chapel on Conduit Hill for a few years, Rye's Salvation Army congregation built a citadel on Rope Walk in 1903. The building has been converted into a shop. It was registered as a place of worship from March 1905 until April 1971.	
Bethel Strict Baptist Chapel (More images)		Rye; 50.9551°N 0.7359°E	Baptist	–	This distinctive Neoclassical building—stuccoed, with the name bethel inscribed above the porch—retains the appearance it had in 1858, when it was built. Charlotte Smith, the wife of a former Mayor of Rye, founded it after experiencing a spiritual conversion. The chapel, which was registered for marriages in November 1934, closed in December 2018 and was put up for sale for £140,000 eight months later.	
Rye Harbour Mission Hall (More images)		Rye Harbour; 50.9385°N 0.7606°E	Methodist	–	This chapel was in the Hastings, Bexhill and Rye Methodist Circuit. It was open for most of the 20th century.	
Sedlescombe Congregational Chapel (More images)		Sedlescombe; 50.9274°N 0.5368°E	Congregational	–	The 1879 Congregational chapel had only been open for about five years when a disagreement in the congregation resulted in a secession led by a Mr Tuppenney. They built a Vernacular-style brick chapel next door. It closed in 1907 when the earlier divisions were overcome, and was converted into the village police station and, later, two houses.	
Sedlescombe Wesleyan Chapel (More images)		Sedlescombe; 50.9326°N 0.5351°E	Methodist	–	This was used for worship between 1812 and 1924, and has subsequently had many uses and much alteration: a shop, a wartime cinema, an engineering workshop and now a house. Farmer Henry Freeland founded it during Methodism's 19th-century heyday. Originally the red-brick building had lancet windows.	
Our Lady of the Rosary Church (More images)		Sidley; 50.8589°N 0.4625°E	Roman Catholic	–	Fr Geoffrey Smith, a local priest, and architect Alex Watson designed this brown-brick church in the 1950s to serve the growing Sidley suburb. The land was donated by a wealthy resident. A large gable at the front, resembling a broken pediment, is held on four equally spaced piers. It opened in 1954 and the first Mass was celebrated on 11 May of that year, although the church was not formally registered for worship until November 1955. Registration for marriages followed three months later. Closure came on 6 October 2019; the building had outlasted its expected useful life of 50 years.	
Three Oaks Methodist Church (More images)		Three Oaks; 50.9028°N 0.6173°E	Methodist	–	Now a house, this church was still in use in 1999, when it was part of a group of mostly rural churches administered from Rye. It was registered for marriages in July 1968.	
Ticehurst Methodist Church (More images)		Ticehurst; 51.0456°N 0.4122°E	Methodist	–	A.W. Pocock's Decorated Gothic Revival chapel, with gabled side windows, a large rose window and stone-dressed red brickwork (now painted), was built in 1897. Earlier Methodist chapels in the village dated from 1821 and 1840; the latter had a cottage and a school attached. It was used for worship until the mid-20th century, and was registered for marriages between June 1928 and March 1971. The building is now in residential use.	
Udimore Methodist Chapel (More images)		Udimore; 50.9382°N 0.6668°E	Methodist	–	This building's exterior has been altered since its closure in 1960. H. and C. Coleman built it in 1882; it originally had a stuccoed façade topped with finials. It was registered for marriages in April 1907. Another Methodist chapel stood at Cock Marling, elsewhere in Udimore parish, between 1863 and 1907.	
Beulah Methodist Chapel (More images)		Westfield; 50.9118°N 0.5760°E	Methodist	–	Closed after 1999 and converted into a house, this brick chapel dates from 1851. The entrance porch was a much later addition, but the bargeboards and flat-arched windows are original. The church was not registered for marriages until February 1958.	
Winchelsea Methodist Chapel (More images)		Winchelsea; 50.9244°N 0.7070°E	Methodist	II	A plain brick building of 1785, built onto an older house, this chapel has connections with John Wesley, who preached here in 1789 and 1790. The mansard roof is tiled. Original fittings such as the pulpit and gallery survive. Occasional services are still held in the chapel, which was registered for marriages in February 1923, and the Methodist Church still owns the building.	
Grey Friars Monastery Church (More images)		Winchelsea; 50.9218°N 0.7105°E	Pre-Reformation	I	Only a stair-turret, the chancel walls and chancel arch of this 14th-century church still stand. They are Decorated Gothic in style, probably date from the 1310s and have been described by Nikolaus Pevsner as "one of the most impressive [sets of Franciscan remains] there are" in England. The ruins stand in the garden of a private house built in 1819. The Franciscans came to Winchelsea in 1224; the monastery and church were ruined during the Dissolution of the Monasteries.	
Whatlington Methodist Church (More images)		Woodman's Green, Whatlington; 50.9468°N 0.5082°E	Methodist	II	This distinctive Gothic Revival chapel has a tall tower topped with a spire. The walls are stuccoed, and all windows have pointed arches. Schoolrooms were also provided when it was built in 1872. It became a workshop and premises after its closure in about 1936, although during World War II it was also used to hold evacuees.	

== See also ==
- List of demolished places of worship in East Sussex
