= Listed buildings in Icklesham =

Historic structures in East Sussex, England

Icklesham is civil parish in the Rother district of East Sussex, England. The civil parish includes the villages Icklesham, Rye Harbour, Winchelsea Beach and the town of Winchelsea. It contains 141 listed buildings that are recorded in the National Heritage List for England. Of these eight are grade I, seven are grade II* and 126 are grade II.

This list is based on the information retrieved online from Historic England

== Listing ==
=== Icklesham ===
Name	Grade	Location	Type	Completed (Note: The date given is the date used by Historic England as significant for the initial building or that of an important part in the structure's description.)	Date designated	Grid ref. (Note: The grid reference is based on the British national grid reference system, sometimes known as OSGB36, used by the Ordnance Survey.) Geo-coordinates	Entry number (Note: The "List Entry Number" is a unique number assigned to each listed building and scheduled monument by Historic England.)	Image	Wikidata
Ashes Farmhouse	II	Icklesham, Hog Hill			13 May 1987	TQ8894715811; 50°54′39″N 0°41′11″E	1234183	Upload Photo	Q26527602
Hog Hill Windmill	II	Icklesham, Hog Hill			3 August 1961	TQ8871316025; 50°54′46″N 0°40′59″E	1234180	Upload Photo	Q5877244
The Cottage	II	Icklesham, Hog Hill			13 May 1987	TQ8888415958; 50°54′44″N 0°41′08″E	1234245	Upload Photo	Q26527664
The Mill House of Hog Windmill	II	Icklesham, Hog Hill			13 May 1987	TQ8872616020; 50°54′46″N 0°41′00″E	1234181	Upload Photo	Q26527600
Windmill Cottage	II	Icklesham, Hog Hill			13 May 1987	TQ8889615966; 50°54′44″N 0°41′08″E	1234182	Upload Photo	Q26527601
Icklesham Manor	II	Icklesham, Laurel Lane			3 August 1961	TQ8826316346; 50°54′57″N 0°40′37″E	1234184	Upload Photo	Q26527603
Two Barns at Icklesham Manor to the South West of the House	II	Icklesham, Laurel Lane			13 May 1987	TQ8821916338; 50°54′57″N 0°40′35″E	1276197	Upload Photo	Q26565728
Spring Cottage	II	Icklesham, 1 and 2 Spring Cottage, Main Road			13 May 1987	TQ8720216264; 50°54′56″N 0°39′42″E	1234357	Upload Photo	Q26527770
Cheyney's Almshouses	II	Icklesham, Main Road			13 May 1987	TQ8762316284; 50°54′56″N 0°40′04″E	1276243	Upload Photo	Q26565768
Church Farmhouse	II	Icklesham, Main Road			13 May 1987	TQ8787116515; 50°55′03″N 0°40′17″E	1276242	Upload Photo	Q26565767
Clover Cottage Myrtletwy	II	Icklesham, Main Road			13 May 1987	TQ8778816456; 50°55′01″N 0°40′13″E	1234186	Upload Photo	Q26527605
Jasmine Cottage the Little Cottage	II	Icklesham, Main Road			13 May 1987	TQ8798516530; 50°55′03″N 0°40′23″E	1234266	Upload Photo	Q26527684
Parish Church of All Saints and St Nicolas	I	Icklesham, Main Road			3 August 1961	TQ8804916474; 50°55′02″N 0°40′26″E	1276241	Parish Church of All Saints and St Nicolas More images	Q17535257
Roughters	II	Icklesham, Main Road			13 May 1987	TQ8679215962; 50°54′46″N 0°39′21″E	1276146	Upload Photo	Q26565682
The Vicarage	II	Icklesham, Main Road			11 August 1972	TQ8796616466; 50°55′01″N 0°40′22″E	1234185	Upload Photo	Q26527604
The White Cottage	II	Icklesham, Main Road			13 May 1987	TQ8761116307; 50°54′57″N 0°40′03″E	1234187	Upload Photo	Q26527606
Toke Farmhouse	II	Icklesham, Main Road			3 August 1961	TQ8705516414; 50°55′01″N 0°39′35″E	1234188	Upload Photo	Q26527607
Yew Tree Cottage	II	Icklesham, Main Road			13 May 1987	TQ8773716408; 50°55′00″N 0°40′10″E	1276167	Upload Photo	Q26565701
1 to 4 Oast House Mews	II	Icklesham, 1 to 4 Oast House Mews			13 May 1987	TQ8779816488; 50°55′02″N 0°40′13″E	1234313	Upload Photo	Q26527731
The Queen's Head Inn	II	Icklesham, Parsonage Lane			13 May 1987	TQ8781516644; 50°55′07″N 0°40′14″E	1234360	The Queen's Head Inn More images	Q26527773
The Elms	II	Icklesham, Pett Lane			3 August 1961	TQ8854115837; 50°54′40″N 0°40′50″E	1276244	Upload Photo	Q26565769
Snailham Farm Cottages	II	Icklesham, 1 and 2 Snailham Farm Cottages			13 May 1987	TQ8622916838; 50°55′15″N 0°38′54″E	1234179	Upload Photo	Q26527598
Snailham Farmhouse	II	Icklesham, Snailham Farmhouse			3 August 1961	TQ8595917013; 50°55′21″N 0°38′40″E	1234236	Upload Photo	Q26527655
Mount Pleasant	II	Icklesham, Watermill Lane			13 May 1987	TQ8687816011; 50°54′48″N 0°39′25″E	1234191	Upload Photo	Q26527610
Old Oast Place	II	Icklesham, Watermill Lane			3 August 1961	TQ8658715809; 50°54′42″N 0°39′10″E	1234383	Upload Photo	Q26527791
Scrag Oak	II	Icklesham, Watermill Lane			13 May 1987	TQ8664515578; 50°54′34″N 0°39′13″E	1276246	Upload Photo	Q26565771
The Old School and School House	II	Icklesham, Workhouse Lane			13 May 1987	TQ8787616479; 50°55′02″N 0°40′17″E	1234384	Upload Photo	Q26527792
Mill House	II	Icklesham			13 May 1987	TQ8654516424; 50°55′02″N 0°39′09″E	1234196	Upload Photo	Q26527615

=== Rye Habour ===
Name	Grade	Location	Type	Completed	Date designated	Grid ref. Geo-coordinates	Entry number	Image	Wikidata
1-5 School Cottages	II	Rye Habour, 1-6 School Cottages			13 May 1987	TQ9383819083; 50°56′19″N 0°45′27″E	1234189	Upload Photo	Q26527608
Camber Castle	I	Rye Habour, Sea Road			3 August 1961	TQ9218618457; 50°56′01″N 0°44′01″E	1234738	Camber Castle More images	Q2968747
Harbour Lights	II	Rye Habour			13 May 1987	TQ9422719091; 50°56′19″N 0°45′47″E	1276245	Upload Photo	Q26565770
Old Lifeboat Station (Mary Stanford Boathouse)	II	Rye Habour			27 October 2008	TQ9329917216; 50°55′19″N 0°44′56″E	1392961	Old Lifeboat Station (Mary Stanford Boathouse) More images	Q26672157
Ship Cottage	II	Rye Habour			13 May 1987	TQ9419519050; 50°56′17″N 0°45′45″E	1234190	Upload Photo	Q26527609
The Church of the Holy Spirit	II	Rye Habour			13 May 1987	TQ9378719101; 50°56′20″N 0°45′25″E	1276139	The Church of the Holy Spirit More images	Q26565676
The Martello Tower	II	Rye Habour			3 August 1961	TQ9419818860; 50°56′11″N 0°45′45″E	1234372	The Martello Tower More images	Q17664656
The Watch House	II	Rye Habour			13 May 1987	TQ9422019070; 50°56′18″N 0°45′47″E	1234368	The Watch House More images	Q26527778

=== Winchelsea ===
Name	Grade	Location	Type	Completed	Date designated	Grid ref. Geo-coordinates	Entry number	Image	Wikidata
Cleveland House	II	Winchelsea, Back Lane			13 May 1987	TQ9055617271; 50°55′24″N 0°42′36″E	1276147	Cleveland House More images	Q26565683
Doorway to West of Plat Cottage	II	Winchelsea, Back Lane			3 August 1961	TQ9045217295; 50°55′25″N 0°42′31″E	1276148	Doorway to West of Plat Cottage More images	Q26565684
Plat Cottage	II	Winchelsea, Back Lane			3 August 1961	TQ9046817290; 50°55′25″N 0°42′31″E	1234385	Plat Cottage More images	Q26527793
1-10 Barrack Square	II*	Winchelsea, 1-10 Barrack Square			3 August 1961	TQ9063817478; 50°55′31″N 0°42′40″E	1234386	1-10 Barrack Square More images	Q17556009
Atterswell Cooks Green	II	Winchelsea, Barrack Square			3 August 1961	TQ9065517445; 50°55′30″N 0°42′41″E	1276149	Atterswell Cooks Green More images	Q26565685
Mount Edge the Mount	II	Winchelsea, Barrack Square			13 May 1987	TQ9066117481; 50°55′31″N 0°42′42″E	1234387	Mount Edge the Mount More images	Q26527794
Strand Hill	II	Winchelsea, Barrack Square			13 May 1987	TQ9065717459; 50°55′30″N 0°42′41″E	1276132	Strand Hill More images	Q26565670
Apple Tree, Lion Cottage, St Anthonys	II	Winchelsea, Castle Street			3 August 1961	TQ9053617461; 50°55′30″N 0°42′35″E	1234434	Apple Tree, Lion Cottage, St Anthonys More images	Q26527837
Magazine	II	Winchelsea, Castle Street			3 August 1961	TQ9051017435; 50°55′30″N 0°42′34″E	1234389	Upload Photo	Q26527796
The Armoury	II*	Winchelsea, Castle Street			3 August 1961	TQ9056117459; 50°55′30″N 0°42′36″E	1234432	The Armoury More images	Q17556018
2 Medieval Cellars	II	Winchelsea, Castle Street, in Grounds of the Armoury Castle Street Two Adjoining Cellars Below the South East Corner of the Garden of the Armoury (But no Longer Belonging to the Owner of the Armoury)			13 May 1987	TQ9063117449; 50°55′30″N 0°42′40″E	1276150	Upload Photo	Q26565686
The Well House (Residence)	II	Winchelsea, Castle Street			13 May 1987	TQ9055517430; 50°55′29″N 0°42′36″E	1276134	The Well House (Residence) More images	Q26565672
The Well House above the Town Well and the Wall Adjoining to the East	II	Winchelsea, Castle Street			3 August 1961	TQ9055217447; 50°55′30″N 0°42′36″E	1234388	The Well House above the Town Well and the Wall Adjoining to the East More images	Q26527795
Ye Olde Castle Inne	II	Winchelsea, Castle Street			3 August 1961	TQ9054017482; 50°55′31″N 0°42′35″E	1234390	Ye Olde Castle Inne More images	Q26527797
Battle Abbey Cottage	II	Winchelsea, 4 and 5 Friars Cottage			3 August 1961	TQ9050517263; 50°55′24″N 0°42′33″E	1234391	Battle Abbey Cottage More images	Q26527798
1 and 2 Friars Road	II	Winchelsea, 1 and 2 Friars Road			3 August 1961	TQ9050817281; 50°55′25″N 0°42′33″E	1234435	1 and 2 Friars Road More images	Q26527838
Grey Friars	II	Winchelsea, Friars Road			13 May 1987	TQ9053617071; 50°55′18″N 0°42′34″E	1234394	Grey Friars More images	Q26527801
Cleveland Cottage	II	Winchelsea, Friars Road			3 August 1961	TQ9052817277; 50°55′25″N 0°42′34″E	1234392	Cleveland Cottage More images	Q26527799
The Little House	II	Winchelsea, Friars Road			3 August 1961	TQ9052117231; 50°55′23″N 0°42′34″E	1276098	The Little House More images	Q26565637
The Lodge of Grey Friars	II	Winchelsea, Friars Road			13 May 1987	TQ9051817214; 50°55′23″N 0°42′34″E	1234393	The Lodge of Grey Friars More images	Q26527800
The Ruins of the Church of Grey Friars Monastery in the Grounds of Grey Friars	I	Winchelsea, Friars Road			3 August 1961	TQ9060417099; 50°55′19″N 0°42′38″E	1234450	The Ruins of the Church of Grey Friars Monastery in the Grounds of Grey Friars More images	Q5608383
The White Cottage	II	Winchelsea, Friars Road			3 August 1961	TQ9052917284; 50°55′25″N 0°42′34″E	1234437	The White Cottage More images	Q26680366
White Close	II	Winchelsea, 1 and 2 German Street			3 August 1961	TQ9041417378; 50°55′28″N 0°42′29″E	1234463	White Close More images	Q26527864
Mariteau House	II	Winchelsea, 1-5 German Street			3 August 1961	TQ9038717259; 50°55′24″N 0°42′27″E	1276152	Mariteau House More images	Q26565688
Ballader's Plat Little Plat	II	Winchelsea, German Street			3 August 1961	TQ9040917355; 50°55′27″N 0°42′28″E	1234396	Ballader's Plat Little Plat More images	Q26527803
Becket Yew Tree House Yew Tree Plat	II	Winchelsea, German Street			3 August 1961	TQ9040517321; 50°55′26″N 0°42′28″E	1276110	Becket Yew Tree House Yew Tree Plat More images	Q26565648
Rose Cottage, Sunrise Cottage	II	Winchelsea, German Street			3 August 1961	TQ9041817394; 50°55′28″N 0°42′29″E	1234459	Rose Cottage, Sunrise Cottage More images	Q26527861
The New Inn	II	Winchelsea, German Street			3 August 1961	TQ9041817407; 50°55′29″N 0°42′29″E	1234395	The New Inn More images	Q26527802
Ruins of St John's Hospital	II	Winchelsea, Hasting's Road			3 August 1961	TQ9032416875; 50°55′12″N 0°42′23″E	1276093	Upload Photo	Q26565632
Winchelsea Farmhouse	II	Winchelsea, Hasting's Road			3 August 1961	TQ8947816970; 50°55′16″N 0°41′40″E	1234397	Upload Photo	Q26527804
Anvils (Finch of Winchelsea) Winchelsea Post Office and Household Stores	II	Winchelsea, High Street			3 August 1961	TQ9057817392; 50°55′28″N 0°42′37″E	1234590	Upload Photo	Q26527983
Bank House National Westminster Bank	II	Winchelsea, High Street			3 August 1961	TQ9050617419; 50°55′29″N 0°42′34″E	1234398	Bank House National Westminster Bank More images	Q26527806
Cellar Below the Garden to the South East of Firebrand	II	Winchelsea, High Street			3 August 1961	TQ9056717365; 50°55′27″N 0°42′37″E	1234552	Upload Photo	Q26527948
Firebrand	II	Winchelsea, High Street			3 August 1961	TQ9055517393; 50°55′28″N 0°42′36″E	1234551	Firebrand More images	Q26527947
K6 Telephone Kiosk	II	Winchelsea, High Street			1 October 1987	TQ9057417410; 50°55′29″N 0°42′37″E	1238435	K6 Telephone Kiosk More images	Q26531496
Lookout Cottage	II	Winchelsea, High Street			13 May 1987	TQ9067317386; 50°55′28″N 0°42′42″E	1234589	Lookout Cottage More images	Q26527982
Magazine Cottage	II	Winchelsea, High Street			13 May 1987	TQ9049817441; 50°55′30″N 0°42′33″E	1276153	Upload Photo	Q26565689
Nesbit	II	Winchelsea, High Street			3 August 1961	TQ9059917392; 50°55′28″N 0°42′38″E	1276070	Upload Photo	Q26565611
Periteau House, Including the Cellar Under the Garden	II*	Winchelsea, High Street			3 August 1961	TQ9055517418; 50°55′29″N 0°42′36″E	1234400	Periteau House, Including the Cellar Under the Garden More images	Q17556014
South Garden Wall of the Retreat and Tower Cottage	II	Winchelsea, High Street			13 May 1987	TQ9066017399; 50°55′28″N 0°42′41″E	1276067	Upload Photo	Q26565608
The Court Hall Town Museum	I	Winchelsea, High Street			3 August 1961	TQ9045117424; 50°55′29″N 0°42′31″E	1234513	The Court Hall Town Museum More images	Q17535114
The Garden Wall of the Stone House, High Street and Cellar to the West of it	II	Winchelsea, High Street			13 May 1987	TQ9063517430; 50°55′29″N 0°42′40″E	1234413	The Garden Wall of the Stone House, High Street and Cellar to the West of it More images	Q26527819
The Little Shop	II	Winchelsea, High Street			3 August 1961	TQ9053117418; 50°55′29″N 0°42′35″E	1276154	The Little Shop More images	Q26565690
The Match Box House	II	Winchelsea, High Street			3 August 1961	TQ9052317416; 50°55′29″N 0°42′34″E	1234399	The Match Box House More images	Q26527807
The Parish Church of St Thomas the Martyr	I	Winchelsea, High Street			13 May 1987	TQ9049917355; 50°55′27″N 0°42′33″E	1276072	The Parish Church of St Thomas the Martyr More images	Q17535226
The Retreat	II	Winchelsea, High Street			3 August 1961	TQ9064917409; 50°55′29″N 0°42′41″E	1276118	The Retreat More images	Q26565656
The South Garden Wall of Winchelsea Cottage, Periteau House and the Stone House	II	Winchelsea, High Street			13 May 1987	TQ9059217409; 50°55′29″N 0°42′38″E	1234401	The South Garden Wall of Winchelsea Cottage, Periteau House and the Stone House	Q26527808
The Stone House	II	Winchelsea, High Street			3 August 1961	TQ9062817410; 50°55′29″N 0°42′40″E	1276061	The Stone House More images	Q26565602
The Strand Gate	I	Winchelsea, High Street	Town wall gatehouse		3 August 1961	TQ9068317406; 50°55′29″N 0°42′43″E	1234546	The Strand Gate More images	Q17535128
Tower Cottage	II	Winchelsea, High Street			3 August 1961	TQ9066817408; 50°55′29″N 0°42′42″E	1234545	Tower Cottage More images	Q26527942
Winchelsea Cottage	II	Winchelsea, High Street			3 August 1961	TQ9057017415; 50°55′29″N 0°42′37″E	1276155	Winchelsea Cottage More images	Q26565691
Winchelsea War Memorial	II	Winchelsea, High Street			29 January 2010	TQ9044917408; 50°55′29″N 0°42′31″E	1393649	Winchelsea War Memorial More images	Q26672799
Wren Cottage	II	Winchelsea, High Street			3 August 1961	TQ9056717393; 50°55′28″N 0°42′37″E	1234550	Upload Photo	Q26527946
Elm Cottages	II	Winchelsea, 1 and 2 Higham Green			13 May 1987	TQ9045617504; 50°55′32″N 0°42′31″E	1276074	Elm Cottages More images	Q26565614
Cellar Below Bay Tree House	II	Winchelsea, Higham Green			11 August 1972	TQ9045517452; 50°55′30″N 0°42′31″E	1234555	Upload Photo	Q26527951
Gable Red Sails	II	Winchelsea, Higham Green			3 August 1961	TQ9042317429; 50°55′30″N 0°42′29″E	1234553	Gable Red Sails More images	Q26527949
Higham Cottage	II	Winchelsea, Higham Green			3 August 1961	TQ9042517444; 50°55′30″N 0°42′29″E	1276073	Higham Cottage More images	Q26565613
Ivy Cottage Mint Cottage	II	Winchelsea, Higham Green			13 May 1987	TQ9046417550; 50°55′33″N 0°42′32″E	1234556	Upload Photo	Q26527952
Remains of the Town Pound	II	Winchelsea, Higham Green			13 May 1987	TQ9044717552; 50°55′34″N 0°42′31″E	1234554	Remains of the Town Pound More images	Q26527950
Salutation Cottages	II	Winchelsea, 2 and 3 Mill Road			3 August 1961	TQ9054217524; 50°55′33″N 0°42′36″E	1276020	Salutation Cottages More images	Q26565564
Armoury Plat	II	Winchelsea, Mill Road			5 October 2022	TQ9060717500; 50°55′32″N 0°42′39″E	1482450	Armoury Plat More images	Q122213859
Cellar Below New Cottage	II	Winchelsea, Mill Road			13 May 1987	TQ9048517503; 50°55′32″N 0°42′33″E	1276076	Upload Photo	Q26565616
Cellar	II	Winchelsea, Mill Road, below the Forecourt to the West of Three Garages at the East Corner of Mill Road and Higham Green			13 May 1987	TQ9045917518; 50°55′32″N 0°42′31″E	1276021	Upload Photo	Q26565565
Five Chimneys	II	Winchelsea, Mill Road			3 August 1961	TQ9057217520; 50°55′32″N 0°42′37″E	1276075	Five Chimneys More images	Q26565615
Line's End	II	Winchelsea, Mill Road			3 August 1961	TQ9048617530; 50°55′33″N 0°42′33″E	1234557	Line's End More images	Q26527953
Mana Platt	II	Winchelsea, Mill Road			3 August 1961	TQ9046417534; 50°55′33″N 0°42′32″E	1234611	Mana Platt More images	Q26528000
Mulberry Cottage	II	Winchelsea, Mill Road			13 May 1987	TQ9044217536; 50°55′33″N 0°42′30″E	1234558	Mulberry Cottage More images	Q26527954
Pipewell Cottages	II	Winchelsea, 1 and 2 North Street			13 May 1987	TQ9041317603; 50°55′35″N 0°42′29″E	1276001	Pipewell Cottages More images	Q26565545
The Five Houses	II*	Winchelsea, 1, 2 and 3 North Street			3 August 1961	TQ9047217588; 50°55′35″N 0°42′32″E	1234560	The Five Houses More images	Q17556022
Broad View	II	Winchelsea, North Street			3 August 1961	TQ9042717600; 50°55′35″N 0°42′30″E	1234561	Broad View More images	Q26527956
Cellar	II	Winchelsea, North Street, below Nos 1 and 2 Moneysellers			13 May 1987	TQ9039617609; 50°55′35″N 0°42′28″E	1234646	Upload Photo	Q26528032
Cellar	II	Winchelsea, North Street, below the Green in Front of Pipewell Cottages			13 May 1987	TQ9041017612; 50°55′36″N 0°42′29″E	1234562	Upload Photo	Q26527957
Cordwainers	II	Winchelsea, North Street			13 May 1987	TQ9054917595; 50°55′35″N 0°42′36″E	1234635	Cordwainers More images	Q26528021
King's Leap	II	Winchelsea, North Street			13 May 1987	TQ9057517589; 50°55′35″N 0°42′37″E	1234559	King's Leap More images	Q26527955
Part of the Former Town Wall West of Upper and Lower Pendents	II	Winchelsea, North Street	Town Wall		3 August 1961	TQ9050817584; 50°55′35″N 0°42′34″E	1234636	Part of the Former Town Wall West of Upper and Lower Pendents More images	Q26528022
The Wall Cottage	II	Winchelsea, North Street			13 May 1987	TQ9054117579; 50°55′34″N 0°42′36″E	1276077	The Wall Cottage More images	Q26565617
Cellar Below Black Friars Platt	II	Winchelsea, Rectory Lane			13 May 1987	TQ9033917349; 50°55′27″N 0°42′25″E	1234563	Upload Photo	Q26527958
Evans	II	Winchelsea, Rectory Lane			3 August 1961	TQ9034417371; 50°55′28″N 0°42′25″E	1276003	Evans More images	Q26565547
Ruins Opposite the Methodist Church in the Grounds of Mill Farm	II	Winchelsea, Rectory Lane			3 August 1961	TQ9031617375; 50°55′28″N 0°42′24″E	1234565	Ruins Opposite the Methodist Church in the Grounds of Mill Farm More images	Q26527960
The Methodist Church	II	Winchelsea, Rectory Lane			3 August 1961	TQ9034417377; 50°55′28″N 0°42′25″E	1234564	The Methodist Church More images	Q26527959
Cellar Below Higham Mews	II	Winchelsea, Robert's Hill			13 May 1987	TQ9035817471; 50°55′31″N 0°42′26″E	1275961	Upload Photo	Q26565508
Land Gate, the Pipewell	I	Winchelsea, Robert's Hill	Town wall gatehouse		3 August 1961	TQ9037417641; 50°55′37″N 0°42′27″E	1234567	Land Gate, the Pipewell More images	Q17535139
Mill Cottage	II	Winchelsea, Robert's Hill			3 August 1961	TQ9034317515; 50°55′32″N 0°42′25″E	1276009	Mill Cottage More images	Q26565553
Remains of the Former Town Wall in the Grounds of Pipewell to the North of the House	II	Winchelsea, Robert's Hill			3 August 1961	TQ9029617685; 50°55′38″N 0°42′23″E	1276039	Upload Photo	Q26565582
St Mary's House the Mill Farmhouse	II	Winchelsea, Robert's Hill			3 August 1961	TQ9023717559; 50°55′34″N 0°42′20″E	1234566	St Mary's House the Mill Farmhouse More images	Q26527961
Strand Platt	II*	Winchelsea, 1 and 2 Rookery Lane			3 August 1961	TQ9062417380; 50°55′28″N 0°42′39″E	1275964	Strand Platt More images	Q17556142
Barn Opposite Rookery Cottage	II	Winchelsea, Rookery Lane			13 May 1987	TQ9063317315; 50°55′26″N 0°42′40″E	1234733	Barn Opposite Rookery Cottage More images	Q26528119
Cellar in the Garden of No 2 Strand Platt to the South of the House	II	Winchelsea, Rookery Lane			13 May 1987	TQ9061517347; 50°55′27″N 0°42′39″E	1234730	Upload Photo	Q26528116
Rookery Cottage	II	Winchelsea, Rookery Lane			13 May 1987	TQ9061417322; 50°55′26″N 0°42′39″E	1234765	Rookery Cottage More images	Q26528147
The Five Houses	II*	Winchelsea, 4 and 5 School Hill			3 August 1961	TQ9046717579; 50°55′34″N 0°42′32″E	1234608	The Five Houses More images	Q17556025
Glebe	II	Winchelsea, St Thomas's Street			3 August 1961	TQ9053417309; 50°55′26″N 0°42′35″E	1234737	Glebe More images	Q26528123
Haskards	II	Winchelsea, St Thomas's Street			13 May 1987	TQ9054617349; 50°55′27″N 0°42′35″E	1234736	Haskards More images	Q26528122
Nelgarde	II	Winchelsea, St Thomas's Street			13 May 1987	TQ9053617319; 50°55′26″N 0°42′35″E	1234770	Nelgarde More images	Q26528152
The Ferry	II	Winchelsea, Station Road			13 May 1987	TQ9032717933; 50°55′46″N 0°42′25″E	1275953	Upload Photo	Q26565502
Apple Tree Wick	II	Winchelsea, The Strand			3 August 1961	TQ9075217555; 50°55′33″N 0°42′46″E	1234742	Apple Tree Wick More images	Q26528127
Little Malt Cottage the Old Malthouse	II	Winchelsea, The Strand			3 August 1961	TQ9075217598; 50°55′35″N 0°42′46″E	1234741	Little Malt Cottage the Old Malthouse More images	Q26528126
The Strand House	II	Winchelsea, The Strand			3 August 1961	TQ9074717530; 50°55′32″N 0°42′46″E	1234818	The Strand House More images	Q20128124
Cottage in the Grounds of the Strand House Immediately Adjoining it on the West and Jointly Occupied With it	II	Winchelsea, The Strand			3 August 1961	TQ9073717529; 50°55′32″N 0°42′46″E	1275969	Cottage in the Grounds of the Strand House Immediately Adjoining it on the West and Jointly Occupied With it More images	Q26565515
The New Gate	I	Winchelsea, Wickham Rock Lane	Town wall gatehouse		3 August 1961	TQ9010116438; 50°54′58″N 0°42′11″E	1234744	The New Gate More images	Q17535149
Wickham Manor House	II*	Winchelsea, Wickham Rock Lane			3 August 1961	TQ8983616489; 50°55′00″N 0°41′57″E	1234746	Wickham Manor House More images	Q17556029
Barn to Wickham Manor to the South West of the Manor House	II	Winchelsea, Wickham Rock Lane			13 May 1987	TQ8977516470; 50°54′59″N 0°41′54″E	1275971	Barn to Wickham Manor to the South West of the Manor House More images	Q26565517
Remains of the Former Town Wall	II	Winchelsea, in the Grounds of St Mary's House to the North East of the House			3 August 1961	TQ9026217598; 50°55′35″N 0°42′21″E	1275980	Upload Photo	Q26565526

=== Winchelsea Beach ===
Name	Grade	Location	Type	Completed	Date designated	Grid ref. Geo-coordinates	Entry number	Image	Wikidata
1 and 2 Holfords Farmhouse	II	Winchelsea Beach, 1 and 2 Holfords Farmhouse			13 May 1987	TQ9151816343; 50°54′53″N 0°43′23″E	1234782	Upload Photo	Q26528162
Dovedale Cottage and Spinet	II	Winchelsea Beach, Pett Level Road			13 May 1987	TQ9151016337; 50°54′53″N 0°43′23″E	1234740	Upload Photo	Q26528125
Harbour Farmhouse	II	Winchelsea Beach, Willow Lane			13 May 1987	TQ9170916685; 50°55′04″N 0°43′34″E	1275972	Upload Photo	Q26565518

== See also ==
- Grade I listed buildings in East Sussex
- Grade II* listed buildings in East Sussex

== Sources ==
- Antram, Nicholas; Pevsner, Nikolaus (2012) [1965], Sussex: East, The Buildings of England, New Haven and London: Yale University Press, ISBN 978-0-300-18473-0
