= Rye Particular Baptist Chapel =

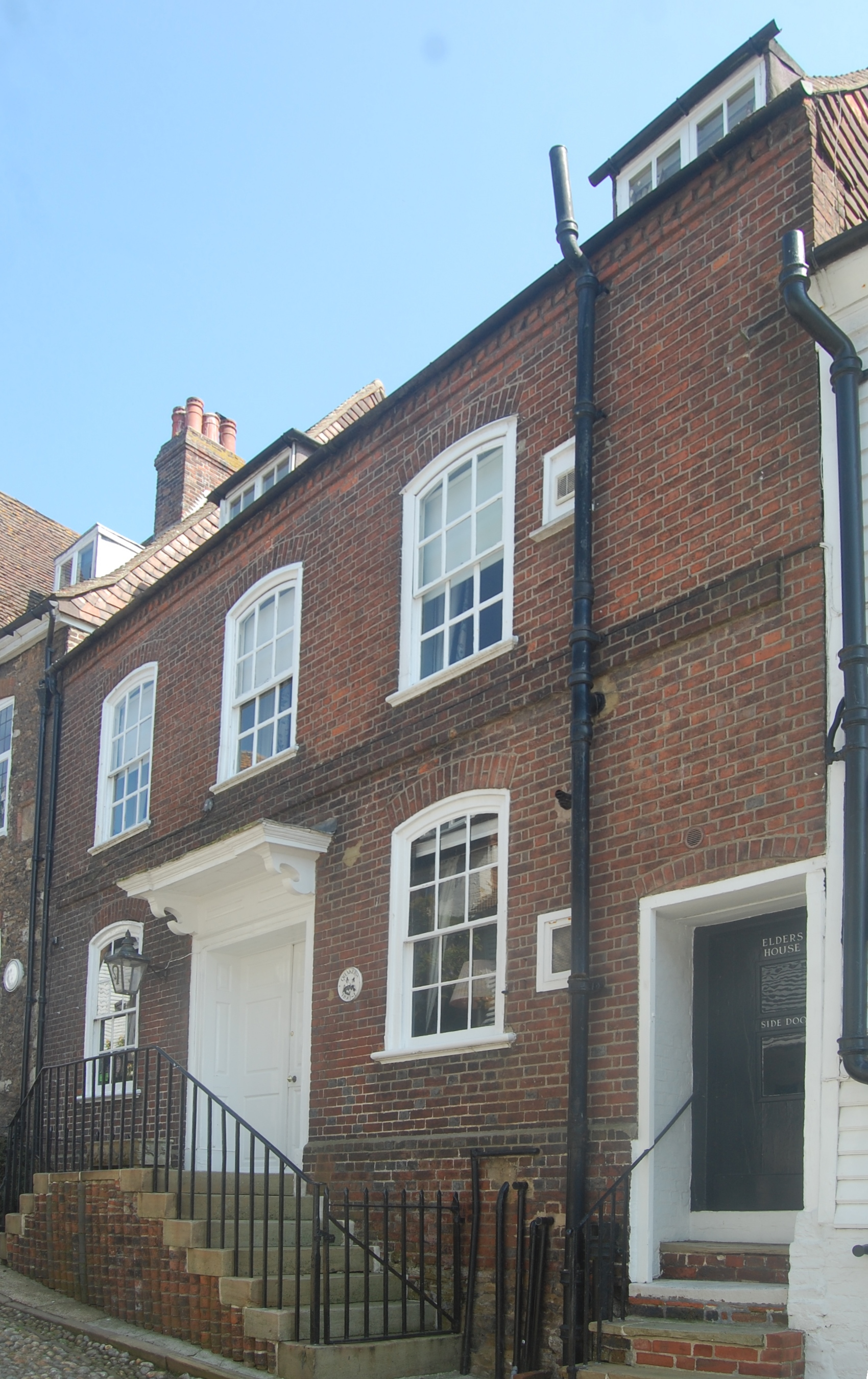
- The former chapel from the southeast in 2023
- Rye Particular Baptist Chapel
- 50.9498°N 0.7312°E
- Location: Mermaid Street, Rye, Rother, East Sussex TN31 7EU
- Country: England
- Denomination: Baptist

History
- Status: Former chapel
- Founded: 1753

Architecture
- Functional status: Residential conversion
- Heritage designation: Grade II
- Designated: 12 October 1951
- Style: Vernacular/Georgian
- Completed: 1754
- Closed: 1910

Rye Particular Baptist Chapel is a former Strict Baptist place of worship in Rye, an ancient hilltop town in Rother, one of six local government districts in the English county of East Sussex. Built in the 18th century on the site of a decaying Quaker meeting house, it served Baptists in the town for many years until a new chapel was constructed nearby. The chapel is a Grade II Listed building.

== History ==
The medieval Cinque Port of Rye, on a sandstone hill in the middle of flat marshland, has (in common with the rest of Sussex) supported a great variety of Christian denominations over the centuries. The earliest post-Reformation community were the Quakers, who founded a chapel on the south side of Mermaid Street in 1700 or 1704. They used this meeting house for the next half-century; but in 1753 it was reported as being "in a very dilapidated condition and past hope of repair". They sold the site to a congregation of Strict Baptists who had just formed in the town. They knocked down the decrepit building and erected a new chapel on the site; it was ready in 1754. An adjacent house was taken over and used as a schoolroom for Baptist children. The religious census of Sussex in 1851 recorded that the chapel had 280 sittings, 150 of which were free; and attendances at morning, afternoon and evening services were given as 80, 60 and 140 respectively. Fifty Sunday school children attended in the morning and afternoon as well.

By 1900, the chapel had been joined by an array of other places of worship. The Church of the Holy Spirit, an Anglican church at Rye Harbour, was established in 1849; a Roman Catholic church was built in 1900; a second Strict Baptist chapel was founded in 1835; Methodists built their chapel in 1814 and extended it in 1852; and in 1882 a Congregational church was founded. Meanwhile, some members of Rye Particular Baptist Chapel seceded from it in 1813 and founded a new independent Baptist church; they met in a house at first, but built their own chapel in 1817. The parish church, St Mary's, had existed since Norman times.

In 1909, a new church was built in nearby Cinque Ports Street. It replaced yet another Baptist chapel of 1844; but the congregation of Rye Particular Baptist Chapel moved to it as well. The 1754 building was closed in 1910 and sold. It became a men's club before being converted into a house, which took the name Quaker's House.

Rye Particular Baptist Chapel, under its new name of Quaker's House, was designated a Grade II Listed building on 12 October 1951.

== Architecture ==
The chapel is a two-storey red-brick building in a Vernacular style. The roof, which has two dormer windows in the attic space above the first floor, is laid with tiles at the rear and slates at the front. The three-bay façade, 29.5 feet (9.0 m) wide, has a wide doorway with a straight canopy supported by ornate brackets. A twin staircase with metal railings leads to the door from the pavement. A thin string course of red bricks separates the ground and first floors, which have two and three shallow-arched sash windows respectively. There are two similar windows on the rear wall; originally the pulpit stood between them. A small gable-ended extension at the rear may have been a vestry. The interior has been opened out to form a single tall open-plan space, although the attic space has been retained.

== See also ==
- Media related to Quaker's House, Rye, East Sussex at Wikimedia Commons
- List of places of worship in Rother
