= St Anthony of Padua Church, Rye =

St Anthony of Padua's Church
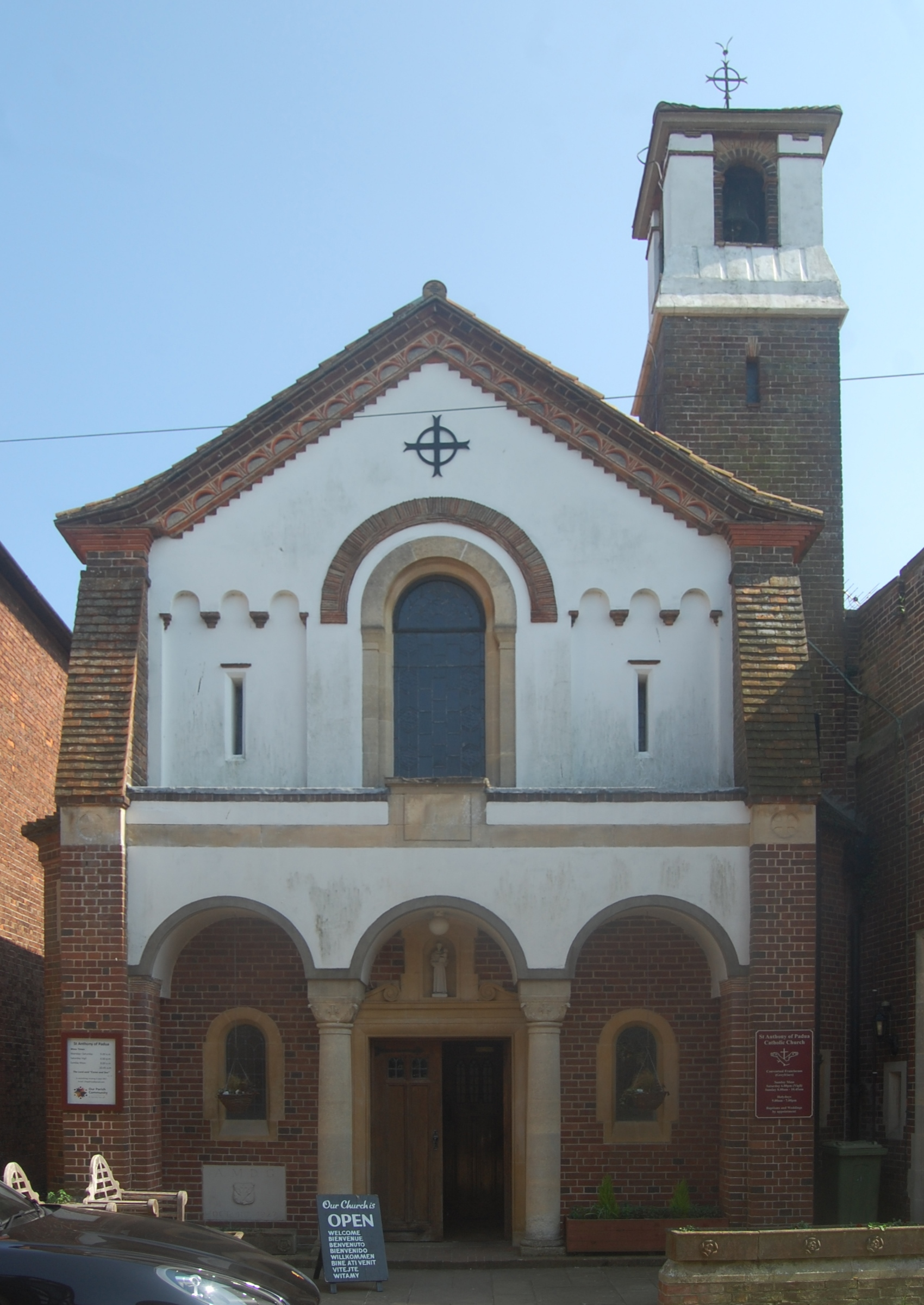
- The church in 2023
- St Anthony of Padua's Church
- 50.9492°N 0.7329°E
- OS grid reference: TQ 92062 20199
- Location: Rye, East Sussex
- Country: England
- Denomination: Roman Catholic
- Website: Greyfriars.org

History
- Former name: St Walburga's Church
- Status: Active
- Founded: 1900
- Dedication: Anthony of Padua

Architecture
- Functional status: Parish church
- Heritage designation: Grade II listed
- Designated: 22 February 2010
- Architect: John Bernard Mendham
- Style: Romanesque Revival
- Groundbreaking: 11 October 1927
- Completed: 30 June 1929

Administration
- Province: Southwark
- Diocese: Arundel and Brighton
- Deanery: St Leonards-on-Sea & Eastbourne

St Anthony of Padua Church is a Roman Catholic Parish church in Rye, East Sussex, England. It was constructed from 1927 to 1929 and replaced a church built in 1900. It is situated on Watchbell Street to the south of Lamb House. It is served by the Conventual Franciscans and is a Grade II listed building.

== History ==
=== Foundation ===
Originally, there was another church on the site of the present one. St Walburga's Church. The church dedicated to Saint Walburga was built in 1900 and was immediately made a parish. In 1906, the Conventual Franciscans came to Rye. A Fr Bonaventure M. Scebberas OFM Conv began to minister in the area. He was the superior of the Conventual Franciscans in England and chaplain to Colonel Frederick Sedley, 5th Marquis of Taflia. Colonel Sedley lived with his family in the house situated between the friary and the church. In 1907, Fr Scebberas was invited to administer St Joseph's Church in Portishead, Somerset. In 1910, administration of St Walburga's Church also was given to the Conventual Franciscans, making the St Anthony of Padua Friary one of the first Conventual Franciscan locations in England since the Reformation. In 1926, the church was too small for the increasing congregation and plans were drawn up to replace St Walburga's Church with a larger one.

=== Construction ===
On 13 July 1927, demolition started on St Walburga's Church. On 9 August 1927, the first brick was laid by Fr Scebberas. On 11 October 1927, the foundation stone for St Anthony of Padua Church was blessed by the Auxiliary Bishop of Southwark, William Francis Brown. The church was designed by John Bernard Mendham (1888–1951). He was born in St Leonards-on-Sea and grew up in Argentina. Before World War I he worked as a surveyor and architect for the Bournville Village Trust. From 1922 to 1939, he worked out of London and later worked on Coventry Cathedral. In 1939, he was behind the building of St Wilfrid's Church in Burgess Hill. St Anthony of Padua Church was built in the Romanesque Revival style with the sanctuary in the Byzantine Revival style; in the shape of a Greek Cross. On 30 June 1929, the church was opened.

== Parish ==
The church is its own parish and has three Sunday Masses they are at 6:00pm on Saturday, and 8:00am and 10:45am on Sunday. There is a weekday Mass at 9:00am on Monday, Tuesday, Wednesday, Friday and Saturday.

== See also ==
- List of places of worship in Rother
- Roman Catholic Diocese of Arundel and Brighton
