= Resta Moore =

English architect

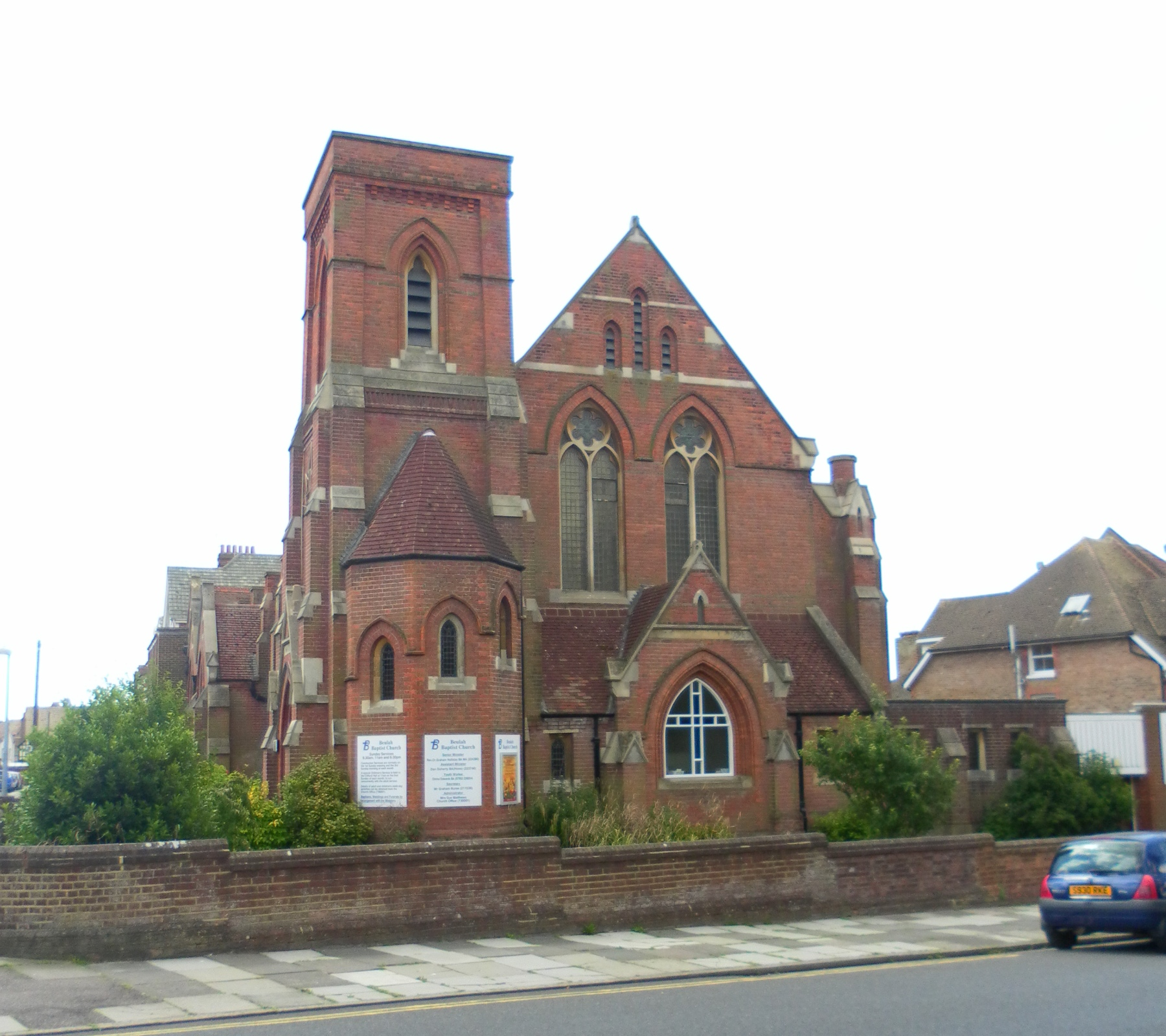
Beulah Baptist Church, Bexhill

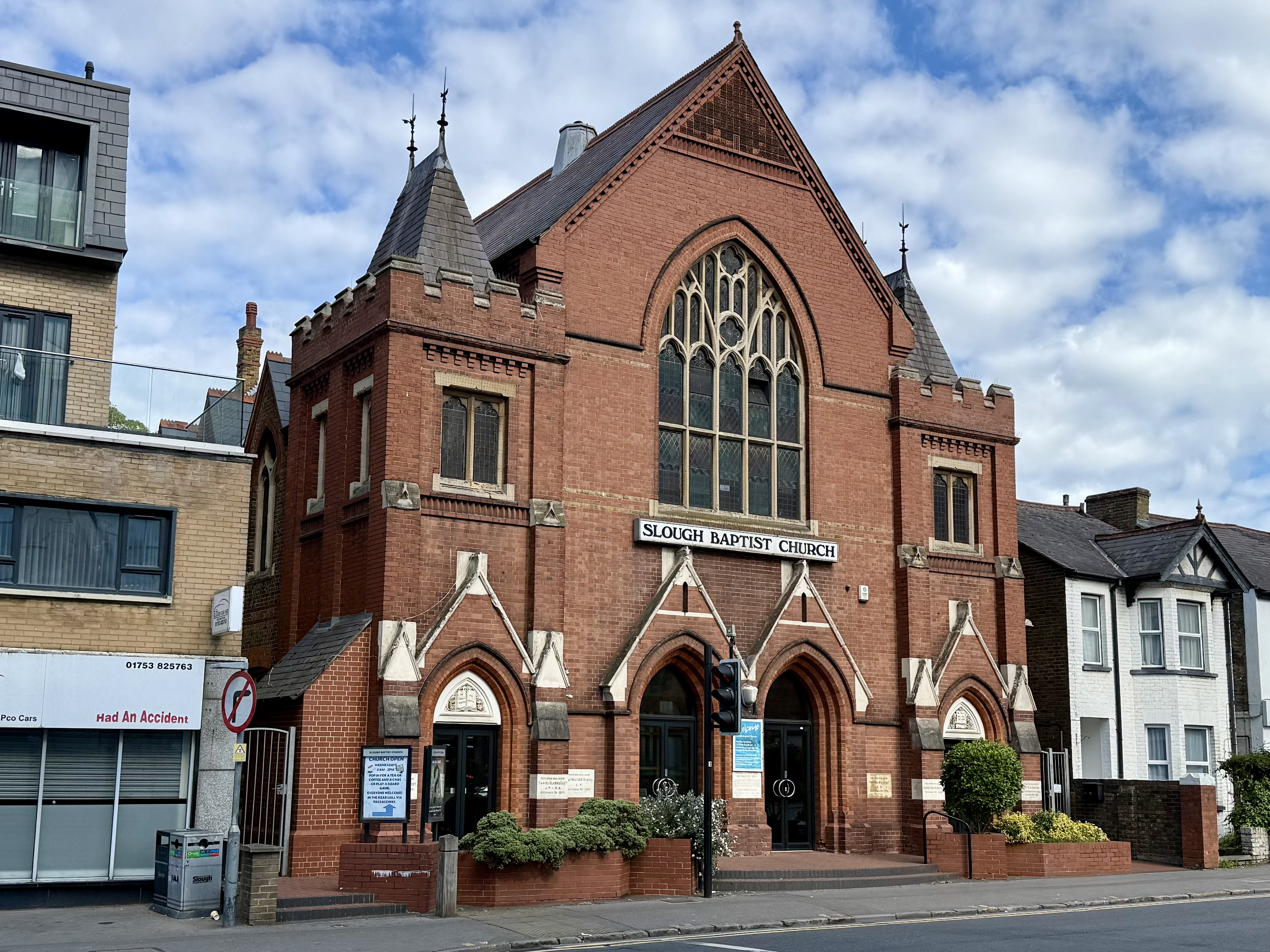
Slough Baptist Church

Resta William Moore (1847–1919) was an architect known for Baptist churches in the south of England. (Note: Not to be confused with Resta William Moore (1906–1963) a relative and also architect working in the south of England.)

== Life ==
He was born in Epsom, Surrey, on 30 November 1847, the son of wool merchant Resta William Moore (1804–1881) and his wife Mary Ann Swayne (1807–1876).

In 1888 he married Mary Ann Trower (1850–1917). They had no children but adopted two boys, one of whom emigrated to Australia.

He lived for many years in Worthing. In retirement he lived at “Stirling”, 16 Amherst Road, Bexhill.

He died on 14 February 1919 in Battle, Sussex and after a memorial service at the Wesleyan Church, Bexhill, was buried on 19 February 1919 in Reigate, Surrey. He left an estate valued at £8,283 (equivalent to £369,779 in 2025).

== Career ==
He was a member of the Local Board in Worthing, and architect of Worthing Baptist Church. He also designed the municipal offices in Worthing.

- Worthing Baptist Church, Christchurch Road/Cambridge Road, Worthing 1880-81 enlarged 1895.
- Steward’s House, Muntham Court, Findon, Worthing 1883
- House and shop, Chapel Road, Worthing 1885
- New Store, North Street, Leatherhead 1888
- Two houses and shops, Railway Approach Road, Worthing 1892
- Beulah Memorial Church, Buckhurst Road/Clifford Road, Bexhill 1896-98
- Slough Baptist Church, Windsor Road, Slough 1904-05
