= Winchelsea Beach =

Seaside village in East Sussex, England

Coordinates: 50°54′48″N 0°43′18.5″E

Winchelsea Beach is a seaside village in the parish of Icklesham in the Rother district of East Sussex, England. The village is located about ten miles (16 km) east of Hastings, and about 1.5 miles (2.4 km) south east of Winchelsea.

The beach itself faces Rye Bay, the estuary of the River Rother. At high tide it is composed of shingle, which is normal on this stretch of coastline; whilst at low tide an expanse of mud and sand is revealed. Many species of birds frequent the sands and the surrounding marshland of Rye Harbour Nature Reserve.

The village has facilities including: a church, Co-op store, two pubs, and a post office. There are two large holiday sites – Rye Bay and Winchelsea Sands Caravan Parks.

== Gallery ==
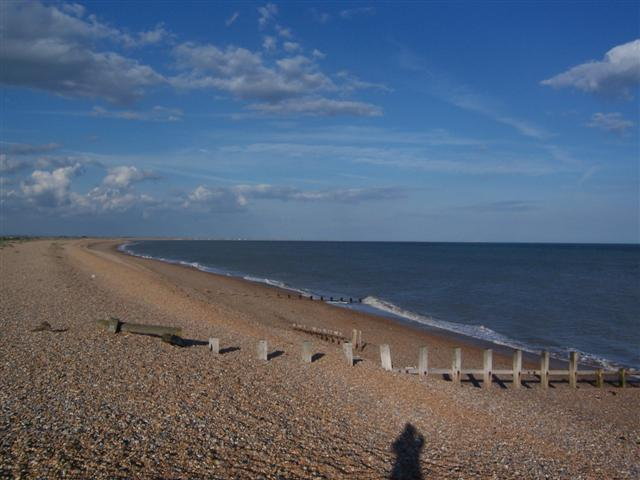
The beach at high tide looking towards Dungeness

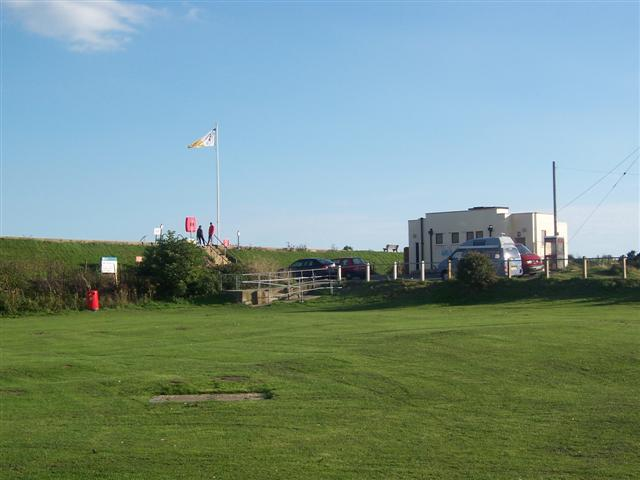
The sea wall seen from the playing field on the site of the old Smeaton's Harbour

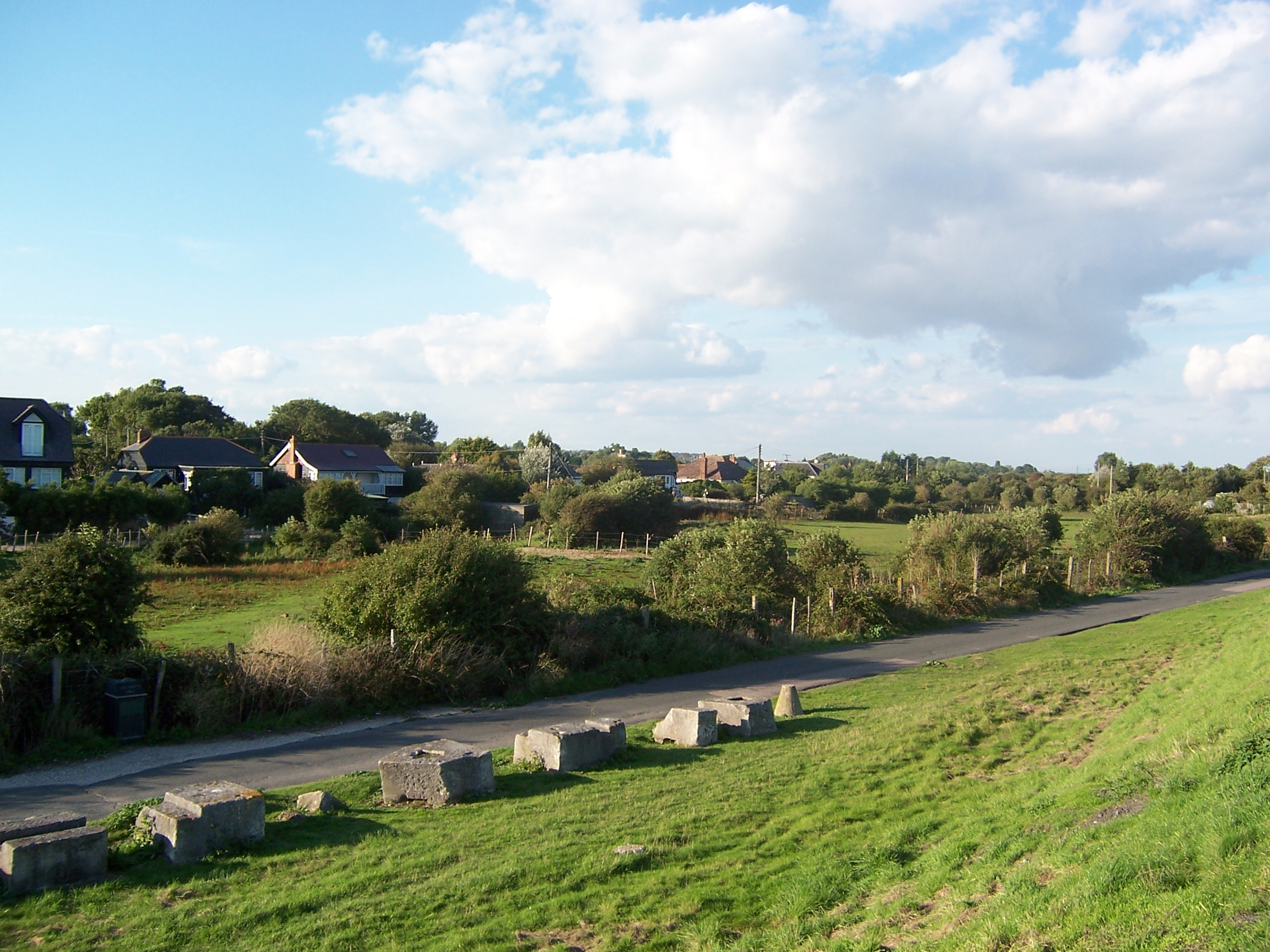
Seaside bungalows seen from the Environment Agency's road from Winchelsea Beach to Rye Harbour
