= Robertsbridge United Reformed Church =

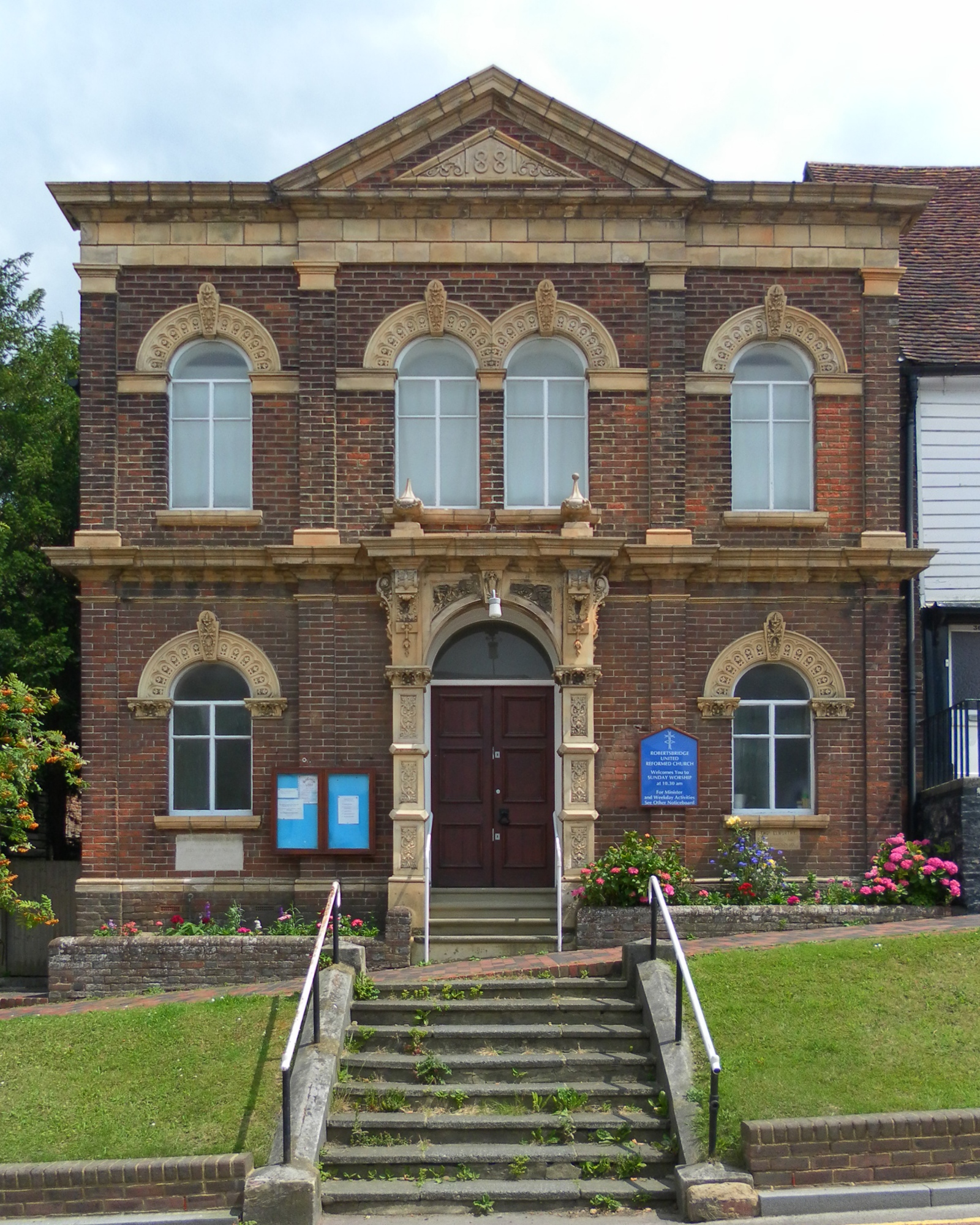
- The church from the west

- Location in East Sussex
- 50.9856°N 0.4747°E
- Location: High Street, Robertsbridge, East Sussex
- Country: England
- Denomination: United Reformed Church
- Previous denomination: Congregational

History
- Former name: Robertsbridge Congregational Church
- Status: Church
- Founded: 29 June 1881
- Founder: Edward Piper

Architecture
- Functional status: Closed
- Heritage designation: Grade II
- Designated: 13 May 1987
- Architect: Thomas Elworthy
- Style: Classical/Italianate/Gothic Revival/Renaissance Revival
- Groundbreaking: 29 June 1881

Robertsbridge United Reformed Church (originally Robertsbridge Congregational Chapel) is a former United Reformed Church place of worship in Robertsbridge, a village in Rother District in the English county of East Sussex. Built for Congregational worshippers in 1881 following their secession from a long-established Wesleyan Methodist chapel, it was the third Nonconformist place of worship in the village, whose nearest parish church was in the neighbouring settlement of Salehurst. Like the former Strict Baptist and Methodist chapels in the village, which have both closed, it no longer serves Robertsbridge as a place of worship. Local architect Thomas Elworthy's distinctive design—a "rich" and highly decorated blend of several styles—has divided opinion amongst architectural historians. English Heritage has listed the church at Grade II for its architectural and historical importance.

== History ==
The village of Salehurst, mentioned in the Domesday survey of 1086, had an extensive parish spanning the River Rother, East Sussex. There was no settlement at Robertsbridge, 1 mile (1.6 km) southwest of Salehurst village, until after 1210, when a Cistercian abbey founded in 1176 moved there from its site further up the valley. By the 14th century Robertsbridge was by far the larger village. There was no place of worship serving the Established Church: a chapel associated with the abbey was last recorded in 1567 and was probably demolished soon afterwards, and the parish church remained in Salehurst. In 1676, when a religious census was taken, Salehurst parish was found to have the second highest number of Nonconformists (28) of any parish in the area: it was behind only Rye, whose Nonconformist population was increased by refugees from continental Europe. (In England, people and ministers who worshipped outside the Church of England and were not part of the Roman Catholic Church were historically known as Nonconformists or Dissenters. Nonconformism became officially recognised after the Act of Uniformity 1662.)

Independents apparently dominated the early Nonconformist scene locally, and Wesleyan Methodism became prominent in the late 18th century. John Wesley visited Robertsbridge five times between 1771 and 1784 and preached to large crowds. A chapel was built in 1812 and extended in 1842, and a Sunday school was added in 1872. One of the early lay preachers during this period of rapid growth, and a leading member of the local Methodist Society, was Edward Piper.

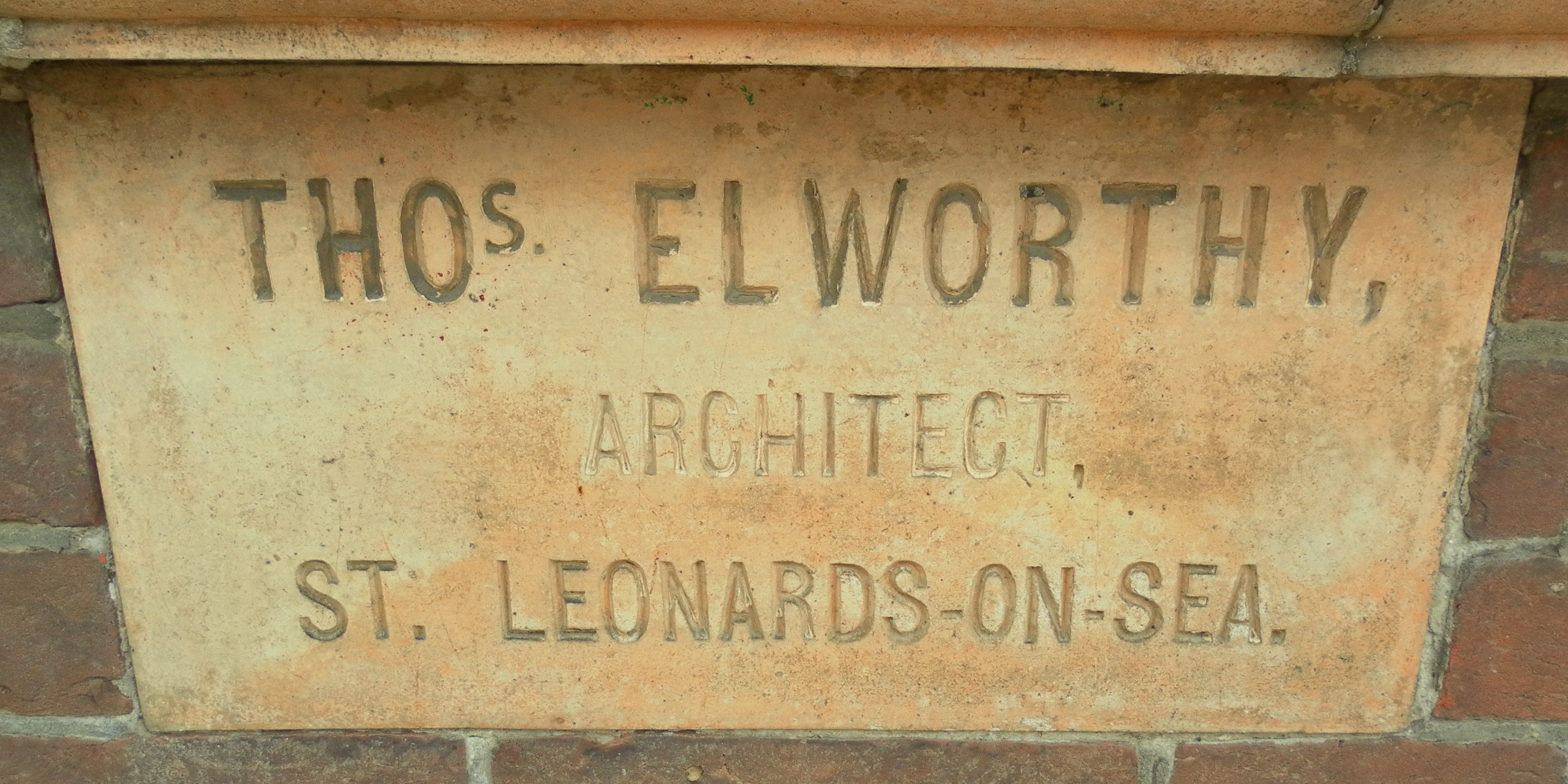
The architect Thomas Elworthy inserted this stone in the brick façade.

In 1876, there was a split in the local Methodist Society, causing some members of the Methodist chapel's congregation to secede. This move was led by Edward Piper, who started holding meetings for Congregational-style worship in a house on Robertsbridge High Street. Five years later, Piper commissioned the St Leonards-on-Sea-based architect Thomas Elworthy to design a new chapel on the site of this house. It was founded on 29 June 1881 by Piper with the help of Rev. Charles New, incumbent at the Robertson Street Congregational Chapel in Hastings. Construction finished soon afterwards, but Piper died almost immediately afterwards—on 20 November 1881, at the age of 70—just before he was due to preach his inaugural sermon. An inscribed stone tablet commemorates him. As well as the foundation (or Memorial) stone on the exterior, Thomas Elworthy inserted a stone inscribed with his name and the date.

The church maintained its connection with the Robertson Street Congregational Church in Hastings into the 20th century, and was served by ministers from Burwash at times. The Methodist chapel closed in 1960, after which the remaining Methodists in Robertsbridge joined worshippers at the Congregational Church. After this, the name Congregational Methodist Church was sometimes used for the building. In 1972, the Congregational Church, Presbyterian Church of England and some other denominations merged to form the United Reformed Church, and the church at Robertsbridge became part of that denomination. Until its closure it was part of the denomination's Southern Synod.

Under the name Robertsbridge United Reformed Church, the building was listed at Grade II by English Heritage on 13 May 1987. This defines it as a "nationally important" building of "special interest". As of February 2001, it was one of 1,991 Grade II listed buildings, and 2,106 listed buildings of all grades, in the district of Rother. It was licensed for worship in accordance with the Places of Worship Registration Act 1855 and had the registration number 33848.

Robertsbridge United Reformed Church closed on 5 September 2015. The building was put up for sale for £200,000 in October 2015, and was later offered at auction at a lower price. The members joined with others to form Community Church Robertsbridge, which is affiliated with the Baptist Union of Great Britain and which meets in the youth centre on George Hill in Robertsbridge.

== Architecture and description ==
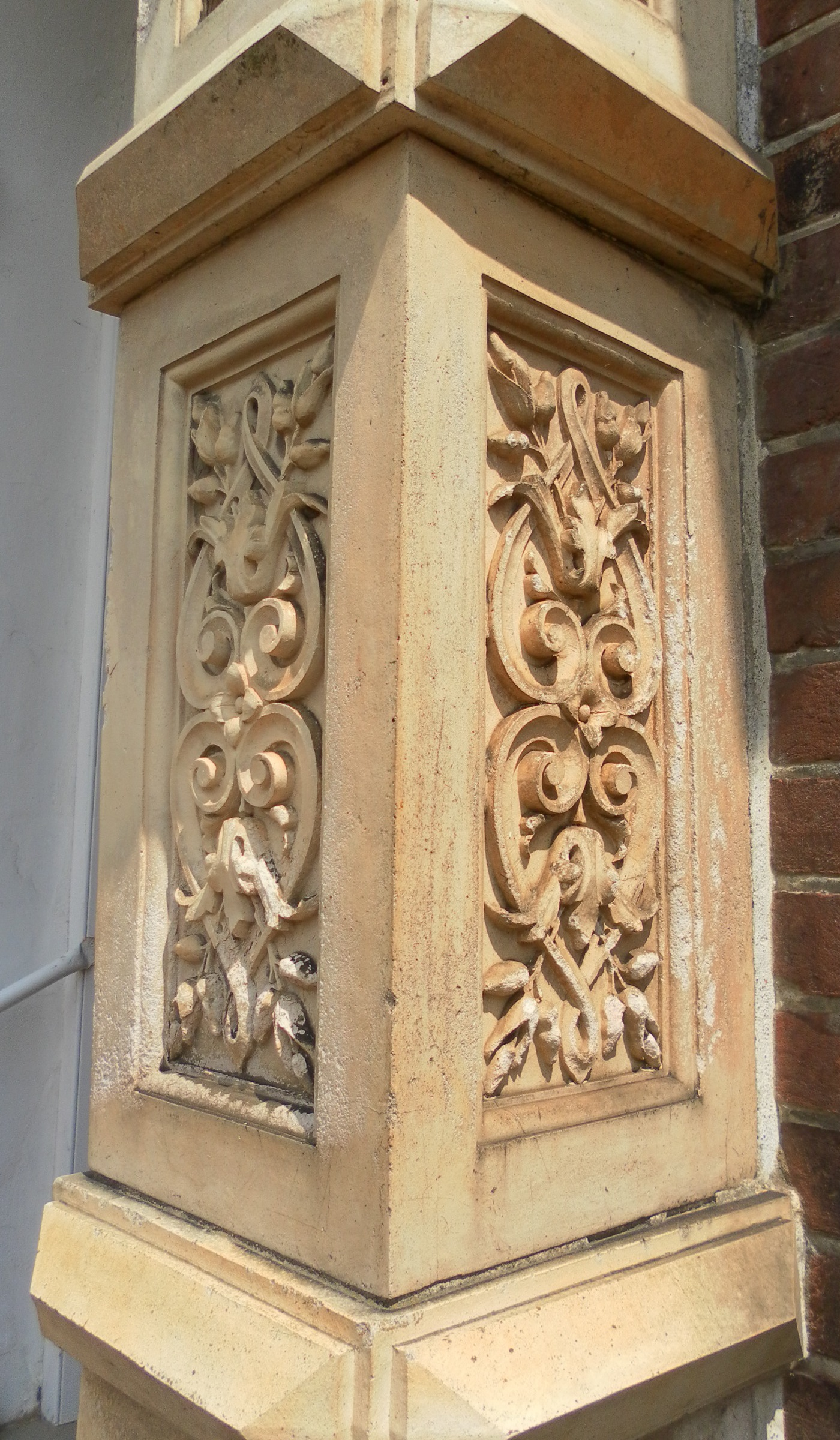
The doorway has moulded pilasters.

Congregationalism was traditionally "a prosperous denomination [that] built well-finished and well-furnished buildings"; by the late 19th century, the quality of some exceeded even that of contemporary Anglican churches, and as of 2006 26% of the surviving 1,115 such churches in England had listed status. Thomas Elworthy, the local architect commissioned to design the church at Robertsbridge, was closely associated with the Hastings area and Nonconformist ecclesiastical architecture. Most of his commissions were for Congregationalists, and most of his works reflect the localised reaction against the Gothic Revival style seen in several parts of Sussex in the 1880s. His Congregational churches at Croft Road, Hastings (1877) and Mount Pleasant Road, Hastings (1878–79; both demolished) were Free Renaissance Revival and Early English Gothic Revival respectively; his St Leonard's Baptist Church of 1883 at St Leonards-on-Sea was a "rich Italianate"; and the Robertsbridge church displayed an eclectic mix of styles. It has elements of the Classical, Renaissance Revival and Italianate styles with some Gothic Revival features. As an architect, Thomas Elworthy is "often maligned", and critical reaction to the building has varied: Nikolaus Pevsner called it "truly horrible" and "most dissolute", whereas a more recent analysis by English Heritage saw it as a "rich and fruity example of a Nonconformist church". Sussex church historian Robert Elleray described the church as "very Victorian" and "an unexpected Renaissance intrusion into the predominantly 18th-century High Street", and thought Pevsner had made "a harsh judgement".

The church is principally of red brick with extensive use of terracotta dressings. The façade, on an elevated section of the High Street known as High Pavement, rises to two storeys and has three bays with a four-window range. A stone cornice separates the lower and upper storeys, and another runs below the parapet upon which a central brick pediment stands. This was originally surrounded by a balustrade with stone urns. The bays are divided by brick pilasters. The windows are all casements and are set below semicircular fanlights in ornately moulded round-headed surrounds. The outer bays have single windows, but those above the entrance are paired. The doorway has moulded pilasters and a cornice topped with stone urns, and the door is panelled.

== See also ==
- Bethel Strict Baptist Chapel, Robertsbridge
- List of places of worship in Rother
