= Bethel Strict Baptist Chapel, Robertsbridge =

Bethel Strict Baptist Chapel
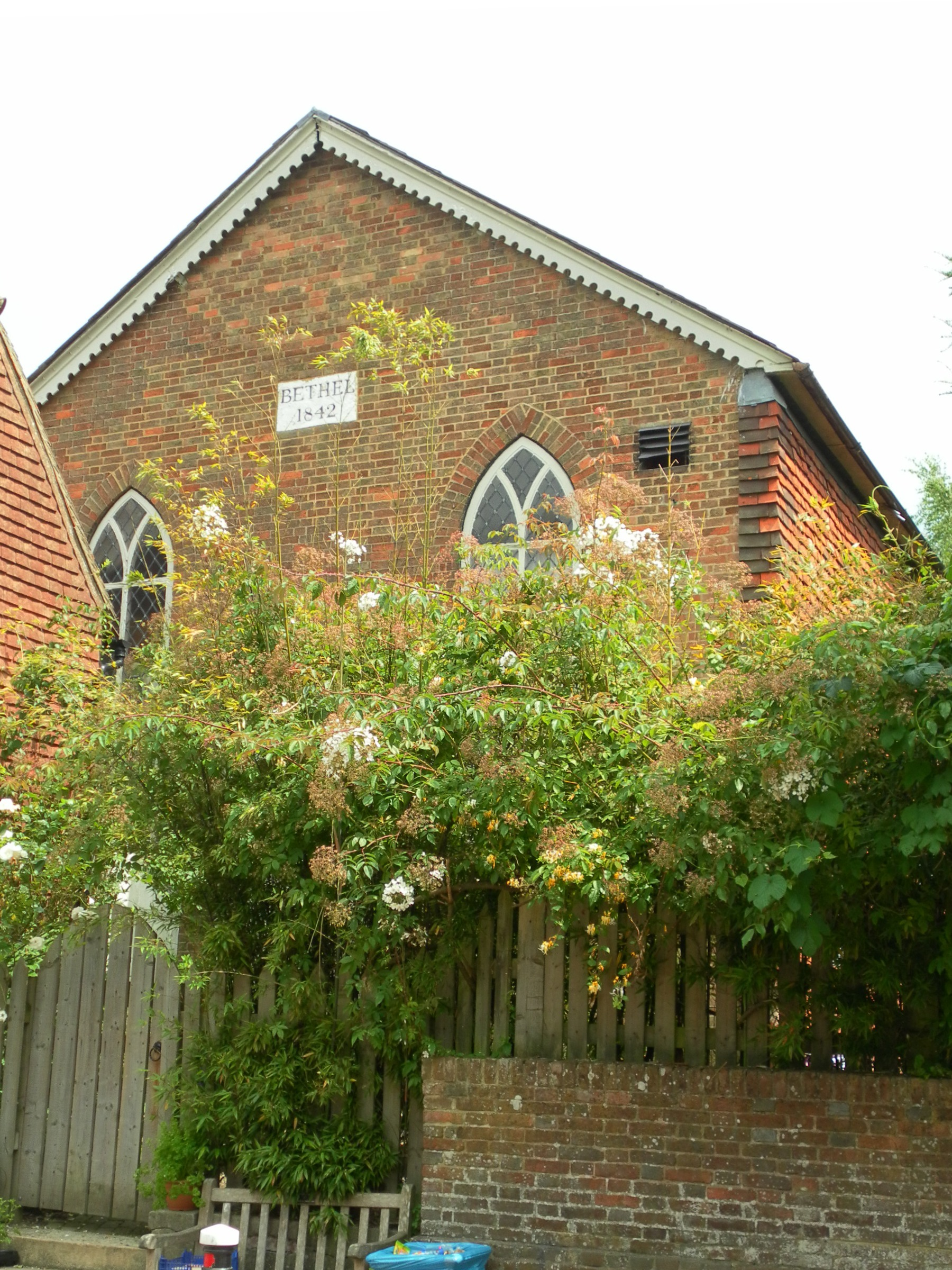
- The former chapel from the west

- Location in East Sussex
- 50.9861°N 0.4748°E
- OS grid reference: TQ 73790 23607
- Location: High Street, Robertsbridge, East Sussex
- Country: England
- Denomination: Baptist
- Churchmanship: Strict Baptist

History
- Status: Chapel
- Founded: 1 November 1842
- Founder: James Weller

Architecture
- Functional status: Closed
- Heritage designation: Grade II
- Designated: 13 May 1987
- Style: Vernacular
- Groundbreaking: 1 November 1842
- Completed: 17 January 1843
- Closed: c. 1999

Bethel Strict Baptist Chapel (also described as Bethel Calvinist Chapel) is a former place of worship for Strict Baptists in Robertsbridge, a village in Rother District in the English county of East Sussex. Partly hidden behind ancient buildings on the village High Street, the simple brick chapel was erected in 1842 on the initiative of James Weller, a "somewhat remarkable man" whose preaching had attracted large audiences across Kent and East Sussex in the previous decade. The Strict Baptist cause was historically strong in East Sussex, and Protestant Nonconformism thrived in Robertsbridge, which was distant from the nearest Anglican parish church. The chapel closed in about 1999, and permission was granted for its conversion into a house. English Heritage has designated it a Grade II Listed building.

== History ==
The village of Salehurst, mentioned in the Domesday survey of 1086, had an extensive parish spanning the River Rother. There was no settlement at Robertsbridge, 1 mile (1.6 km) southwest of Salehurst village, until after 1210, when a Cistercian abbey founded in 1176 moved there from its site further up the valley. By the 14th century, Robertsbridge was by far the larger village. There was no place of worship serving the Established Church, though: a chapel associated with the abbey was last recorded in 1567 and was probably demolished soon afterwards, and the parish church remained in Salehurst. In 1676, when a religious census was taken, Salehurst parish was found to have the second highest number of Nonconformists (28) of any parish in the area: it was behind only Rye, whose Nonconformist population was increased by refugees from continental Europe. (In England, people and ministers who worshipped outside the Church of England but were not part of the Roman Catholic Church were historically known as Nonconformists or Dissenters. Nonconformism became officially recognised after the Act of Uniformity 1662.)

Many Nonconformist denominations thrived in Sussex from the 17th century, some of which overlapped, merged, and changed their ecclesiology over time. Calvinistic causes were particularly popular, especially in East Sussex. Belief in predestination and the salvation of a chosen group (the doctrine of limited atonement) were shared across all Calvinistic groups, but Strict Baptists also hold the view that communion is only to be taken by those who have become members of the Church through baptism. In 1809, Jacob Martell—a member of the Independent Calvinistic Cade Street Chapel near Heathfield—adopted these views and was ejected from that church. He moved to Burwash and founded a Strict Baptist chapel in 1810. Six years later, Shover's Green Baptist Chapel was established by former members of the Burwash congregation.

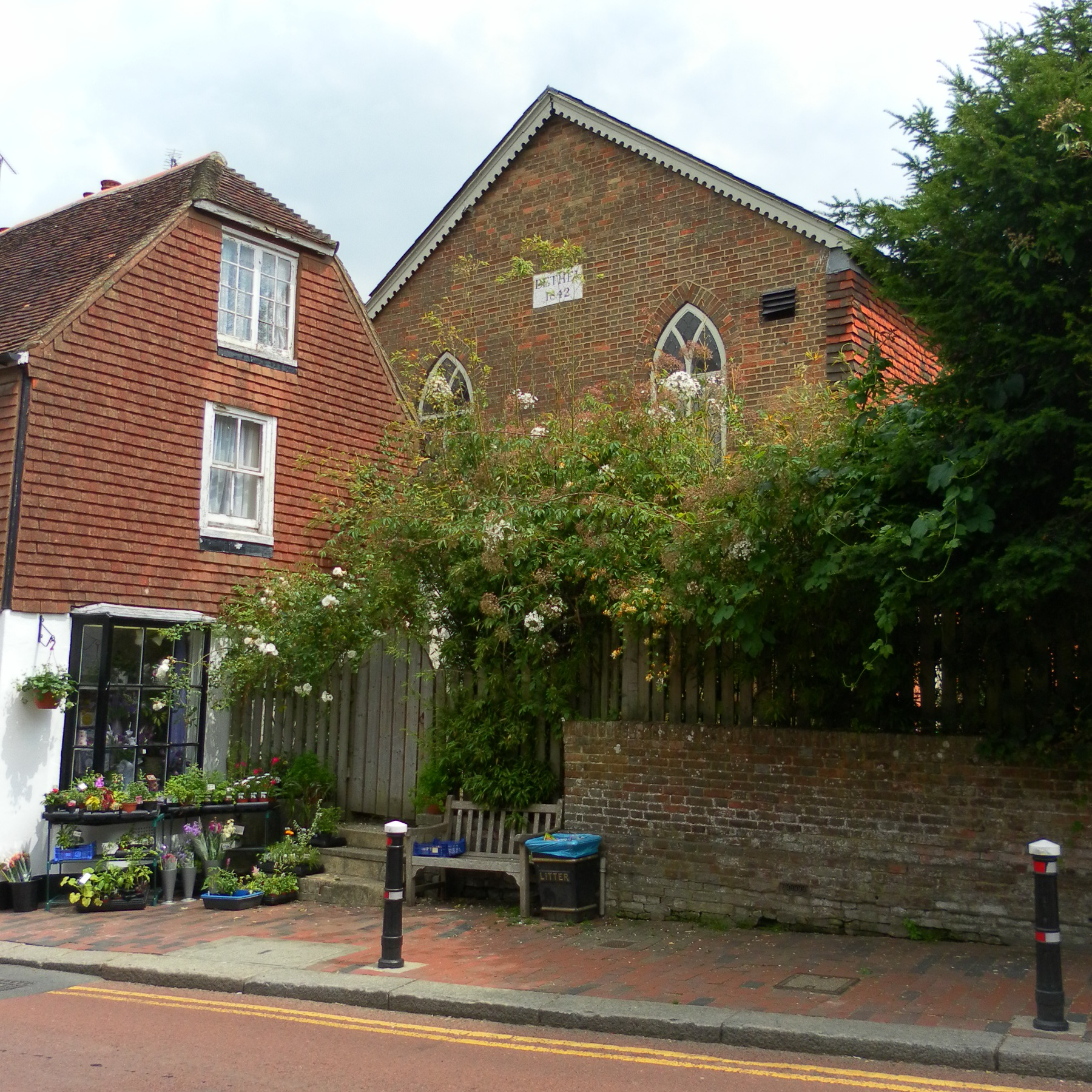
The chapel stands behind a shop on Robertsbridge High Street.

James Weller came to Burwash in 1838 as a 31-year-old preacher who had been a prominent figure in the Strict Baptist cause in Kent throughout the 1830s. Born in Headcorn, he became a poor farmer and was baptised into the Church of England. In about 1828, during a serious illness, he experienced a spiritual conversion and adopted Calvinistic Baptist beliefs. He was re-baptised at King Street Chapel in Maidstone in 1831. Over the next few years, he preached regularly at chapels in Frittenden, Smarden, Headcorn and (from 1837) at the Shover's Green chapel. The following year, he went to its parent church at Burwash; his growing reputation meant he continued to visit chapels across East Sussex and Kent, where he drew large crowds.

In his "curious little autobiography" called The Wonders of Free Grace, as Manifested in the Life of James Weller, Minister of the Gospel, Bethel Chapel, Robertsbridge (1844), Weller described his concerns at the running of the Burwash chapel, and in 1842 he had the opportunity to establish his own chapel when a friend, James Caffyn, offered him a house on the High Street in Robertsbridge which he could turn into a place of worship. This included a lease for 50 years and an annual maintenance fund of £10. The first stone of the chapel, "half hidden behind a shop and a cottage", was laid on 1 November 1842. Weller officially left the chapel at Burwash in January 1843, and Bethel Strict Baptist Chapel opened on 17 January 1843. Weller said that he preached to a very large congregation, but that he "was sorely tried the whole of the day with [his] own debts and those of the chapel". It was common in Sussex for chapels to be built for the benefit of particular preachers rather than because the local populace demanded one, and in the chapel's early years many members of the congregation were drawn from the chapel at Burwash rather than from Robertsbridge village.

Bethel Chapel was constituted (officially formed into a church) in August 1844. Weller's ill health and debt problems continued, and he died in 1847. In his History of Salehurst Leonard Hodson said that while he was a "somewhat remarkable man", he was more of a "dreamer" than a practical man and his philosophy was that of a "mystical Micawber". Nevertheless, his preaching was influential: its effect on the wife of the Mayor of Rye caused a spiritual conversion which led to her becoming a Baptist and founding the Bethel Strict Baptist Chapel at Rye, which was in religious in use until 2018.

George Stedman became the pastor at the Robertsbridge chapel in 1848 and continued until 1881; in 1864, during his pastorate, the chapel became aligned to the Gospel Standard Baptist movement. No other full-time pastor led the chapel after Stedman's death, and it declined in the early 20th century. There was a revival from 1940, when it was reconstituted and regular worship recommenced, and the chapel was registered for marriages in August 1962. The congregation still met as late as 1996, but in October 1999 planning permission was granted to convert the chapel into a house.

Bethel Chapel was listed at Grade II by English Heritage on 13 May 1987.

== Architecture and description ==
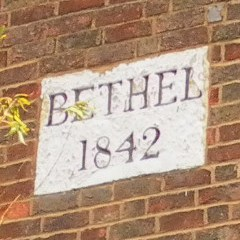
High on the front elevation is a carved date stone.

Bethel Chapel is "an excellent example of the unobtrusive good taste of the Strict Baptists' chapel style", and its "quaint" appearance contrasts with the "very Victorian", "rich and fruity" neighbouring Congregational Church of 1881. Weller's chapel was built in 1842, as indicated on the carved stone tablet placed high on the west-facing gable. This elevation is of red brick and has two wooden-framed windows with pointed arches containing y-tracery. The sides of the building are hung with red tiles, and the roof has slate tiles. The entrance is set below a gabled hood mould.

Inside, a memorial tablet set into one of the walls commemorated James Weller, who died on 12 September 1847. A Biblical quote, "Blessed are the dead who die in the Lord", concluded the epitaph. George Stedman, the second preacher (d. 2 January 1881), and Christopher Sharp (d. 25 January 1890), another man associated with the chapel's early history, were commemorated together on another stone. James Caffyn (d. 23 October 1894), who gave the site for the chapel, and his two daughters also had a monumental inscription; the children, who died in infancy, were buried in a grave nearby.

== See also ==
- List of places of worship in Rother
- Robertsbridge United Reformed Church
