= Robertson Street United Reformed Church =

- His Place Church
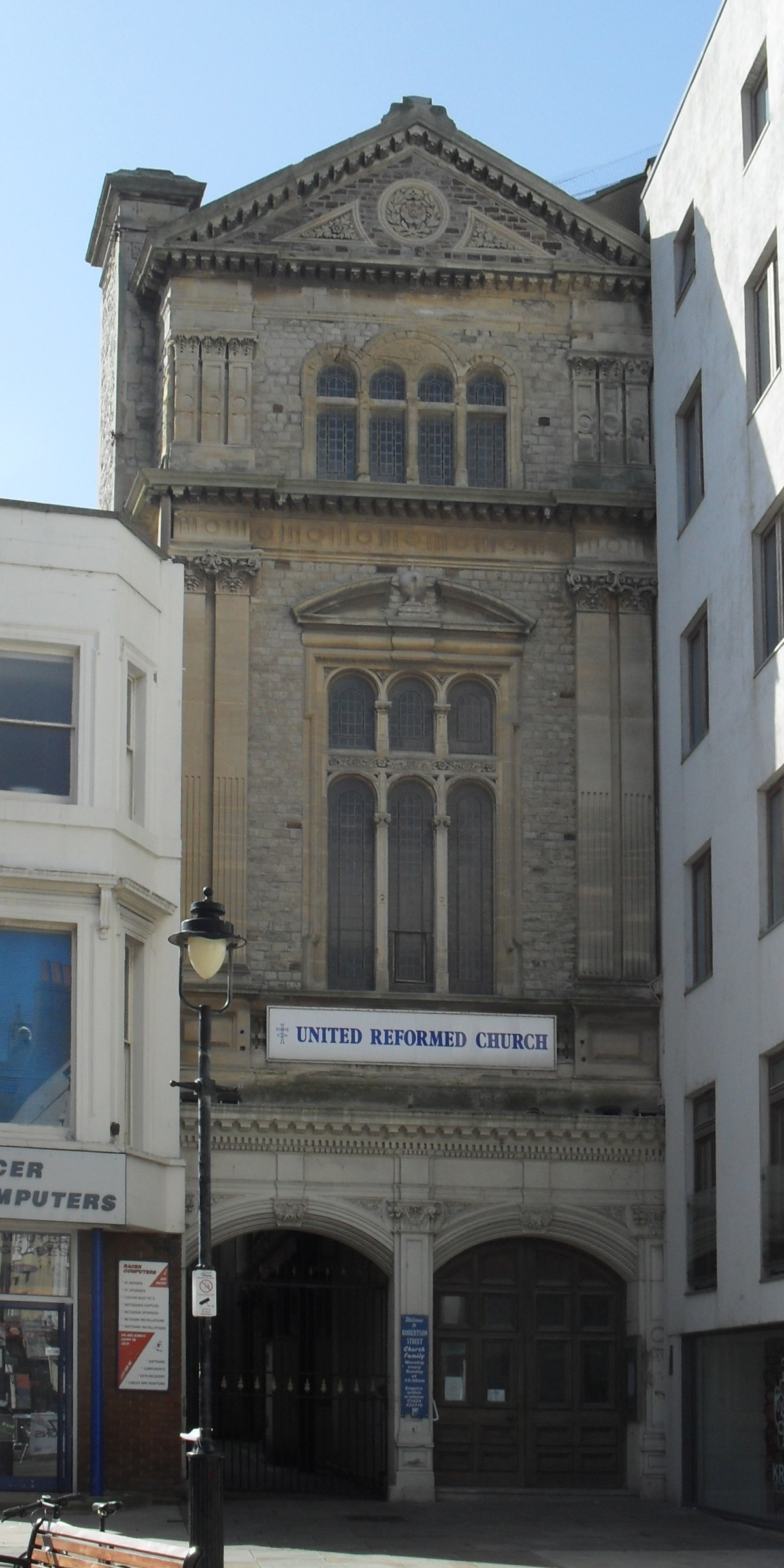
- The Robertson Street entrance to the church in 2010
- Robertson Street United Reformed Church
- 50.8555°N 0.5775°E
- Location: Robertson Street/Cambridge Road, Hastings, East Sussex TN34 1HT
- Country: England
- Denomination: United Reformed Church

History
- Status: Church
- Events: 18 April 1887: registered for marriages 30 December 2012: closed as a United Reformed church 2014: reopened as a Pentecostal church

Architecture
- Functional status: Active (as Pentecostal church)
- Heritage designation: Grade II
- Designated: 29 January 2010
- Architect: Henry Ward
- Style: Neoclassical/Mannerist
- Groundbreaking: 11 September 1884
- Completed: 1885

Robertson Street Congregational Church (since 1972, the Robertson Street United Reformed Church) is a former United Reformed church in the centre of Hastings, a seaside town and borough in East Sussex, England. Built in 1885 on the site of an earlier church which had been constructed in 1857, it was designed by Henry Ward (1854–1927), who was responsible for many of the key buildings in the town of Hastings, not least the Town Hall. The building, a "large urban ... church with richly detailed exteriors and interiors", is situated between Robertson Street and Cambridge Road and has a split-level arrangement with part of the gallery occupying a flying freehold over the alleyway adjacent to the entrance on Robertson Street. The church is listed at Grade II for its architectural and historical importance.

A declining congregation and the cost of maintaining the building forced the church to close in 2012. It was acquired by a Pentecostal Christian group, who had outgrown their church premises elsewhere in the borough, and is still an active place of worship with the name His Place Church.

== Founding and Dedication ==
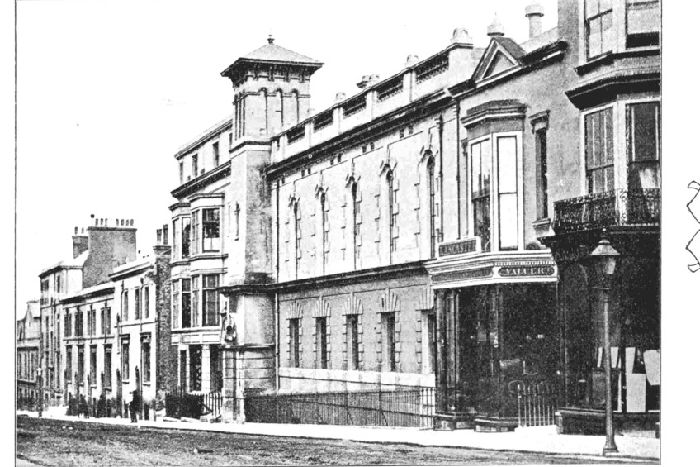
Original URC building viewed from Cambridge Road

The church was founded by Daniel Smith in 1856 who carried out much evangelical work around the town. A Gothic Revival-style building on the site was the congregation's original chapel. The Rev. C. New, one of the most important figures in Hastings' Congregationalist community at the time, was instrumental in getting a new church funded and built after the congregation had out-grown the original building and extensive repairs were required in any case. The construction contract was put out to tender; bids ranged from £6,526 to £8,240, and the chosen contractor was John Howell with a bid of £7,090. In order to permit the expansion, the property next-door to the church had also been purchased.

Whilst the congregation had no church to worship in, services were held at various locations throughout the town, including The Gaiety Theatre and Hastings Pier pavilion.

The Memorial stone was laid on 11 September 1884 at 3:30pm, with a large crowd of people, mainly members of the congregation and worthies such as the Mayor, Alderman Thorpe and a number of Pastors and Ministers of surrounding churches. When the time came to lay the stone, one of the leading Congregationalists of the time, Mr Spicer was presented with a silver trowel to lay the stone. He then declared "In the name of the Father, and of the Son, and of the Holy Ghost, I declare this stone well and truly laid".

The stone was laid on the Cambridge Road side of the building and reads "This stone was laid by James Spicer Esq. J.P., of Woodford on September 11, 1884. Rev. Charles New, Minister. H. Ward Architect. John Howell & Son, builders. The new building was dedicated on 7 October 1885 in a service that was presided over by the Rev. C. New with a large number of both Congregationalist and local dignitaries present.

=== Associated chapels ===
Rev. New founded other Congregational chapels during his ministry. The present Sedlescombe United Reformed Church and the former Robertsbridge United Reformed Church opened in 1879 and 1881 respectively in the villages of Sedlescombe and Robertsbridge, north of Hastings. The chapel at Robertsbridge maintained links with the Robertson Street church for much of the 20th century.

== Decline and Recovery ==
In 1943, total number of church-members had fallen to 238. At services conducted by the Rev. A. E. Gould, in December 1944 there were only 65 attending the morning service and 42 the evening. The Reverend accepted a call to the ministry and was inducted in March 1945. Over the course of just under ten years, he had attracted nearly 400 new members which was reflected in the church roll exceeding 400 by 1955.

During the course of the Rev. Gould's ministry, the church raised £1000 to install replacement electric lighting in 1948, marketing events in advertisements as "The church with a great past invites you to help equip it for a greater future".

Gould was succeeded in 1955 by Rev. Charles A Haig. In the years that followed, the church became a centre of evangelism, with particular credit being given to the quality of its youth and children's work, under the guidance of Kay Mozely.

In 1978, the Rev. Brian Bowyer came to the church and was able to see the church through difficult days when major faults were discovered in the roof. For a long while, the sanctuary was closed, with the congregation worshipping in the church hall below. A mammoth fundraising effort saw the roof repaired in time for a wedding within the church family to take place in the sanctuary as planned.

A ministry team was then developed for the area and different ministries developed. However, the local churches reflected the national trend of declining numbers, and new patterns of providing ministry for the area were constantly being sought.

== Further decline and closure ==
The membership of Robertson Street fell from 42 in January 2010 to 28 at the time of closure in December 2012, mainly as a result of deaths. From January 2012, the congregation began exploring its future, ahead of the Local Mission & Ministry Review (LMMR) process due to take place later in the year. Given that the prospects of receiving a minister were slim (due to demands on URC ministry at this time), that there were major problems with the building which would be expensive to make good, and that there were three other URCs in the town as well as churches of other denominations – all of whom would welcome new faces – the congregation began to question whether the best move might well be to disperse as a fellowship and enrich the lives of other churches through the injection of new members.

The path towards closure was first chosen on 21 September 2012 and confirmed on 30 November of the same year. In its time, Robertson Street URC was an engine for evangelism; it hosted meetings of the local committee of the London Missionary Society as well as the Hastings Council of Churches. Robertson Street URC closed on 30 December 2012.

The church was registered in accordance with the Places of Worship Registration Act 1855; its number on the register was 28925. It was also registered for the solemnisation of marriages on 18 April 1887. Until its closure, Robertson Street United Reformed Church was in that denomination's Southern Synod, one of 13 Synods in Great Britain. As of 2010 the Synod was responsible for 168 United Reformed churches in southeast England, including Robertson Street and three others in the Borough of Hastings: Clive Vale, St Luke's and St Mark's.

=== Re-opening - His Place ===
Since December 2013, the building has been owned by His Place Church under the Reverend Chris Sears. His Place is a Pentecostal fellowship founded in 1984 as a house church; it moved to a former mission hall in Duke Road in 1997, but had outgrown the space. £35,000 was spent on roof repairs and fund-raising continues to permit repair of many parts of the building. Current usages alongside the church include a cafe, a theatre, a 'safe space', mental health support groups and many other community groups.

==== Repairs required ====
The windows and stonework, together with ironwork require repairs costing in excess of £750,000 with additional repairs needed to the Robertson Street entrance. Much of the interior finish has been damaged due to damp ingress (both from the roof which has now been repaired, and leaking/insufficient number of gutters and downpipes). Fund-raising is continuing, both by means of 'sponsorship' of individual building elements and on-going events within the building.

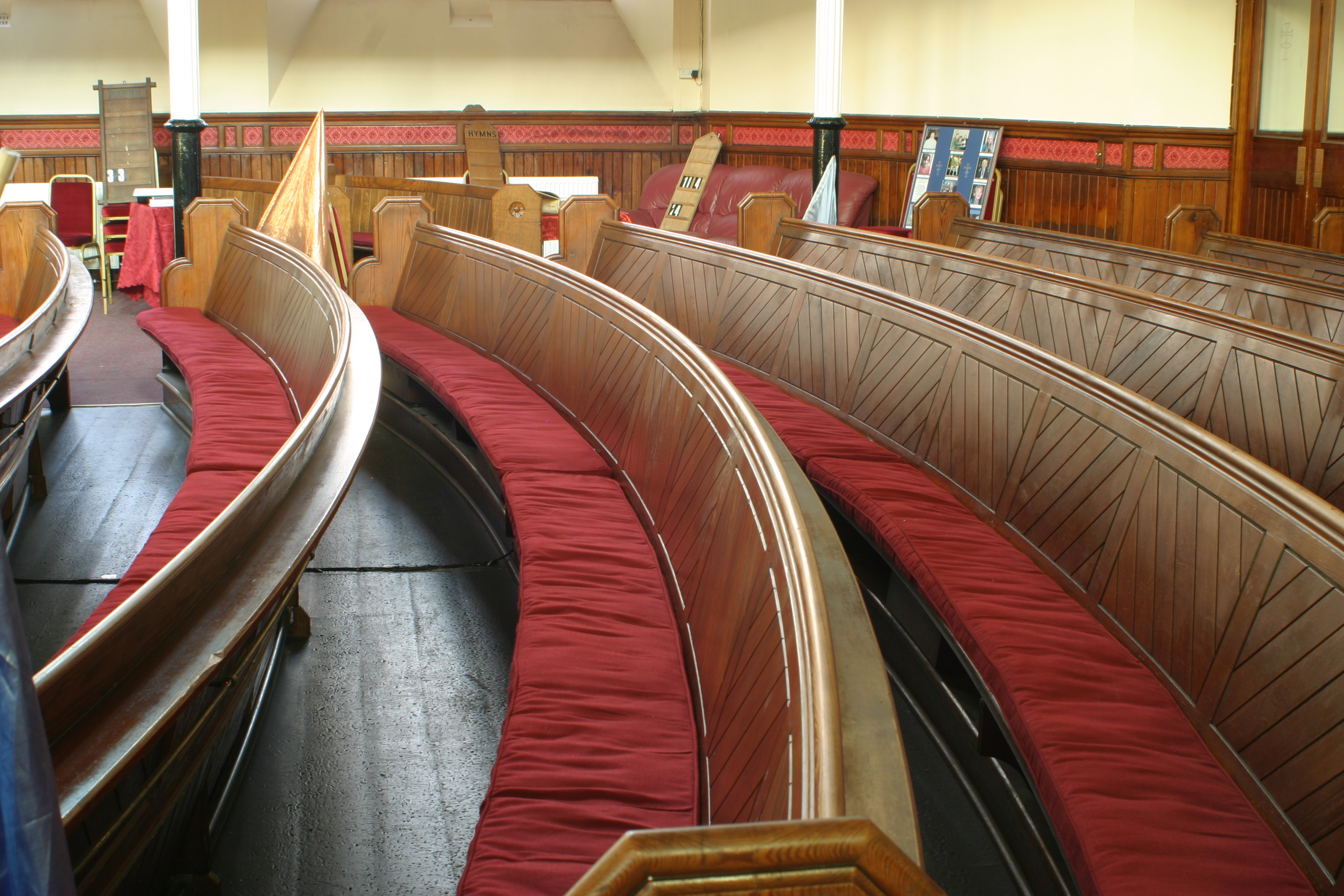
Curved Pews at Robertson Street Congregational Church

== Opus Theatre ==
In addition to the usage as a place of worship the venue is also utilised as a theatre - the Opus Theatre under the direction of Polo Piatti. With the horseshoe shaped auditorium providing excellent acoustics. In addition, the venue is utilised for lectures and other events

== Architecture of the building ==
The church was listed at Grade II by English Heritage on 20 January 2010; this defines it as a "nationally important" building of "special interest".

The building is constructed of coursed ragstone with ashlar and probably terracotta dressings. The doors are made of Oak on both the Cambridge Road and Robertson Street aspects. The Robertson Street entrance has steps carved out of York Stone. A monumental staircase extends up from the Robertson Street entrance after passing a hall which is currently used as a cafeteria. A rear stair and stairs with wrought iron balustrades lead into the horseshoe shaped gallery which repeats the curved pews with under-pew heating. In total there was seating for 1100 people.

It was planned that the basement (which was subdivided into a deacon's vestry, the minister's vestry, the choir vestry, a general vestry, a large hall and lavatories) could be utilised by the Young Mens Christian Association in addition to providing classrooms and meeting rooms.

=== Interior Finishes ===
The galleries, pews, ceiling and roof were made out of pitch pine, with the walls being finished utilising Parian cement (a fast drying cement with borax added to the mix). At the time of dedication, the church was the only non-conformist place of worship lit by electricity.

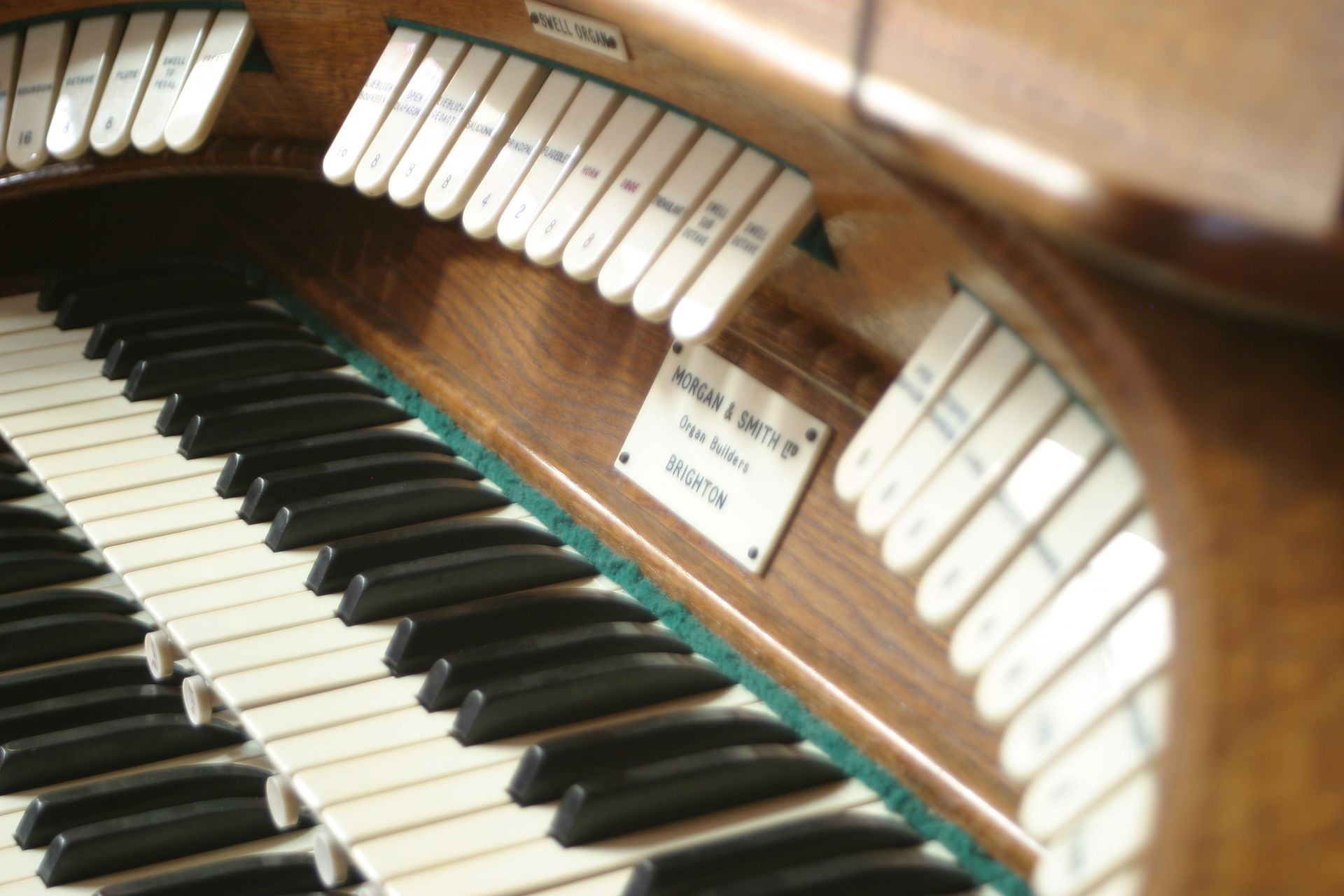
Console of Organ

=== Organ ===
The church features a Forster and Andrews two console organ with highly ornamented pipes mounted unusually above the altar behind the minister. It was later overhauled by Morgan and Smith. Some pipes are currently stored laying down due to deterioration in the mountings and other stops are believed to be inoperable.

== See also ==
- List of places of worship in Hastings

== Bibliography ==
- Elleray, D. Robert (2004). Sussex Places of Worship. Worthing: Optimus Books. ISBN 0-9533132-7-1.
- Hodson, Leonard J. (1914). A History of Salehurst. Robertsbridge: Leonard Hodson.
