= Opus Theatre =

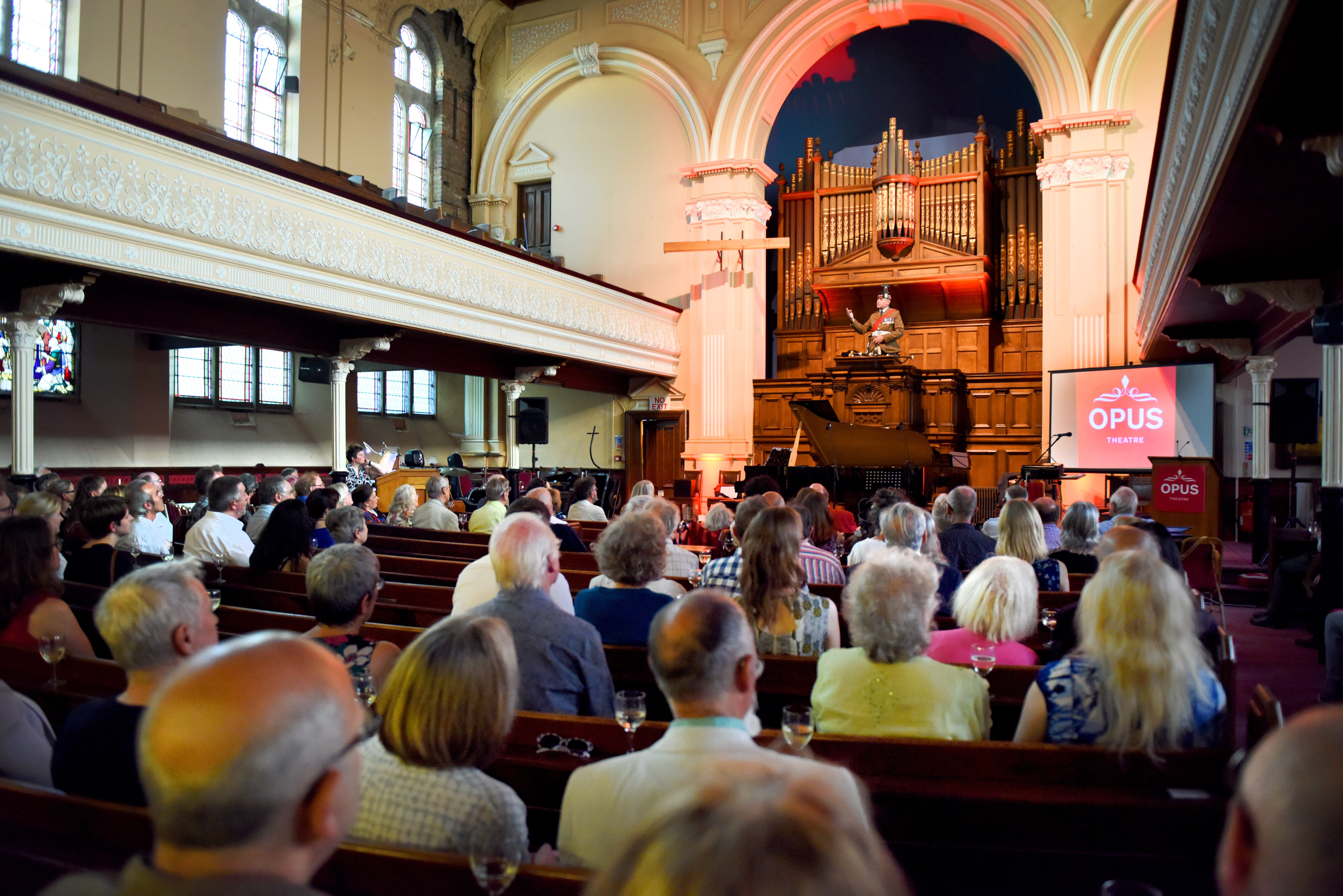

The Opus Theatre was founded by British-Argentine composer and concert pianist Polo Piatti and officially opened on 7 July 2017 in Hastings, in the United Kingdom.

The inaugural performance featured Gwyneth Herbert and Ned Cartwright and Harmony One Choir; live bands The Moors, Loose Ends, and Notes From Underground, poet Pete Donohue, pianist Mike Hatchard, organist Stephen Page and cellist Jonathan Bruce with many other performers.

Since its opening the venue has staged diverse public events including classical concerts, theatre pieces, lectures, etc. The venue's current artists in residence are the London Mozart Players, who opened their year of residence with a performance featuring BBC Young Musician winner (2018) Lauren Zhang and flutist Daisy Noton. The venue's patron is Oliver Poole. Performers appearing at the venue include Carly Paoli, Sunny Li, the London Mozart Players, the London Piano Trio, Nicholas McCarthy and many others.

The venue makes use of shared space in the Robertson Street United Reformed Church, where the horseshoe shaped auditorium provides excellent acoustics. Access to the theatre is via the entrance on Cambridge Road, Hastings, whilst the church utilises the lower entrance in Robertson Street. One of the outstanding features of the venue is the bespoke 9 foot Phoenix Opus grand piano, based upon a 1925 Blüthner Style XI piano body fitted with a carbon-fibre soundboard, the instrument being donated by an anonymous benefactor in 2017 to the theatre.
