= Matthew Curtis =

Matthew Curtis may refer to:

- Matthew Curtis (artist), Australian glass artist, winner of the 2022 FUSE Glass Prize
- Matthew Curtis (composer) (born 1959), British classical composer
- Matthew Curtis (mayor) (1807–1887), British industrialist and mayor of Manchester
