= Li Yun =

Li Yun may refer to:

- Li Yun (Tang Dynasty) (李熅) (died 887), an imperial throne claimant during imperial China's Tang dynasty
- Li Yun (general) (李筠) (died 960), a general during imperial China's Later Zhou and Song dynasties
- Li Yun (politician), vice mayor of Shenzhen, and acting Mayor of Shenzhen.
- Li Yun (Water Margin) (李雲), a fictional character in the classical Chinese novel Water Margin
- Sunny Li (李昀 Li Yun; born 1991), Chinese classical pianist
- Li Yun (badminton) (born 1997), Chinese female badminton player
