= International Composers Festival =

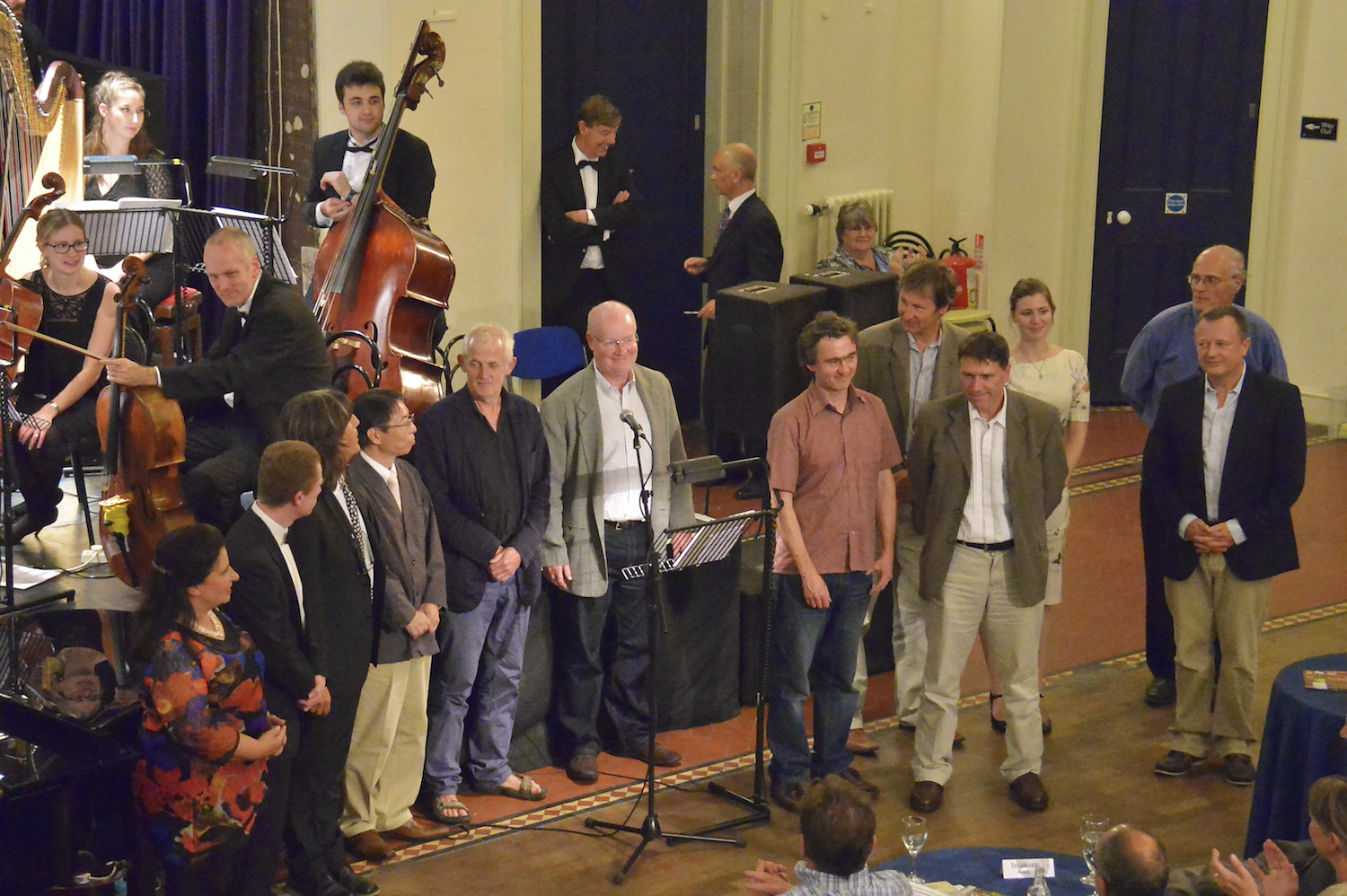
A line-up of celebrated composers during the 2013 festival

The International Composers Festival is a regular event held on the south coast of England, comprising a series of concerts, lectures and networking opportunities, created with the purpose to promote and showcase classical music that is tuneful, universally appealing and created solely by living composers attending the concerts.

The repertoire encompasses works especially selected from submissions from all over the world and includes big orchestral compositions, film scores, computer gaming music, television themes, chamber music and dance music usually performed in six concerts over a long weekend.

== History ==
The festival was founded in 2012 by composer, concert pianist and artistic director Polo Piatti and the festival patrons are composers Nigel Hess and Debbie Wiseman OBE.

The first festival took place on 24-25 August 2012 and subsequent festivals took place in 2013, 2015, 2018 and 2022, always in Hastings and Bexhill-on-Sea, East Sussex, UK.

A strong element in the festival is the opportunity for composers from different parts of the world to come together and network with colleagues and organisations in the United Kingdom. Principal festival conductors have included Stephen Ellery (Wales), Derek Carden (UK), Irish Endo (Japan) and John Andrews (UK) and composers in residence have included Simon Proctor, Nobuya Monta, Ash Madni. The current composer in residence is Paul Lewis and youth ambassador is Oliver Poole.

== 2018 Festival ==
In addition to the Composers in residence, the 2018 festival included;

- Antonio D'Antò - Italy
- Matthew Curtis - United Kingdom
- Sergio Puccini
- Carlos Salomon
- Dominik Scherrer

== 2022 Festival ==
In 2022, the festival received 3,650 entries and offered five public events running from 20 to 22 May; performers included Tim Crawford (violin), Ting-Ru-Lai (viola), Tim Posner (cello) and Sam Armstrong (piano).
