= Oliver Poole (musician) =

British pianist and composer

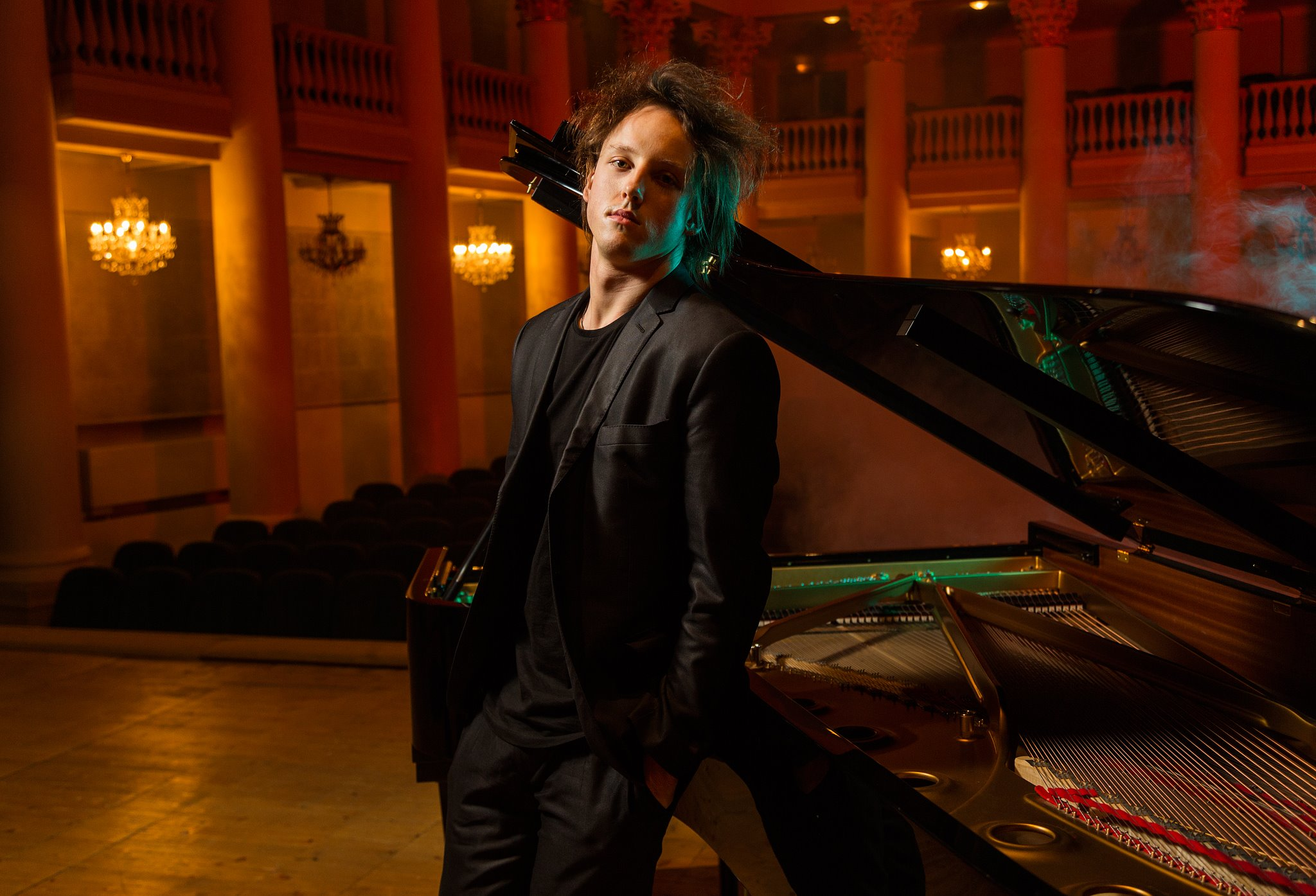
Oliver Poole

Oliver Poole (born 4 August 1991) is a British pianist and composer who has been playing the piano since he was 8 and has made over 71 YouTube videos during his career.

== Career ==
=== Performances ===
Poole gave his first performance as a soloist with the National Youth Orchestra at the age of eight and since has become the subject of numerous press features and broadcasts, including with the BBC, Sky Arts, The New York Times, The Guardian, Voice of America, Russia Today and L'Orient Le Jour.

Poole gave a centenary revival of Anton Rubinstein's 3rd piano concerto at the age of nineteen with the Saint Petersburg Philharmonic Orchestra and has since performed at venues around the world, including the Royal Albert Hall, Great Hall of the Moscow Conservatory, Royal Festival Hall, The Barbican, Cadogan Hall and with orchestras including the Royal Philharmonic Orchestra, Lebanese National Symphony Orchestra, Almaty Symphony Orchestra, and Georgian Philharmonic.

He has performed at festivals and events including the Al Bustan Festival, the International Composers Festival and Classic FM: Night at the Movies.

He is an artist for Emma For Peace and youth ambassador for the 2022 International Composers Festival, as well as patron and former artist in residence at the Opus Theatre, where he co-founded the World Series concert series.
