= Robertsbridge Abbey =

Church in East Sussex, England

Robertsbridge Priory
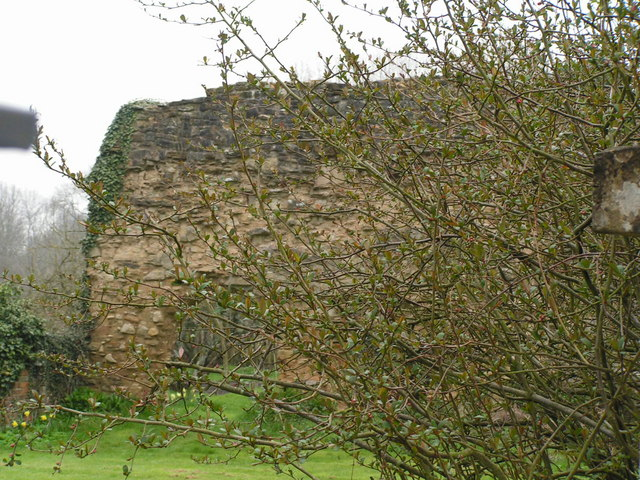
- Remnants of the Abbot’s House
- Interactive map of Robertsbridge Priory

Monastery information
- Full name: The Cistercian Abbey of St Mary, Robertsbridge
- Other names: Robert's Bridge Abbey; Pontrobert Abbey
- Order: Order of Cistercians
- Established: 29 March 1176 at Salehurst; Transferred to Robertsbridge c.1250
- Disestablished: 16 April 1538
- Mother house: Boxley Abbey

Architecture
- Heritage designation: Scheduled ancient monument, grade I listed building
- Designated date: 3 August 1961

Site
- Location: Robertsbridge, East Sussex, England
- Country: United Kingdom
- Coordinates: 50.990587°N 0.490791°E

Robertsbridge Abbey was a Cistercian abbey in Robertsbridge, East Sussex, England. It was founded in 1176 by Alured and Alicia de St Martin.

Due to its position, the Abbey lands suffered continually from the effects of the sea, and it was never rich or prominent. The abbey was eventually forcibly surrendered in 1538 by the Abbot Thomas Taylor, and dissolved as part of the Dissolution of the Monasteries. There were then eight monks. The property afterwards passed to Sir William Sydney.

The main surviving part of the Abbey is the Abbot's house, built circa 1250, formerly a farmhouse but now part of a private residence. The building is mainly of stone rubble with some red brick and brick buttresses at the back, weather-boarded at the gable end with a steeply pitched tiled roof. Beneath the building is a crypt. The house is a grade I listed building.

In the garden of the house are the ruins of a rectangular building of stone rubble which was part of the Frater which are separately grade II* listed.

== See also ==
- List of monastic houses in East Sussex
