= Polo Piatti =

Argentine classical composer and pianist

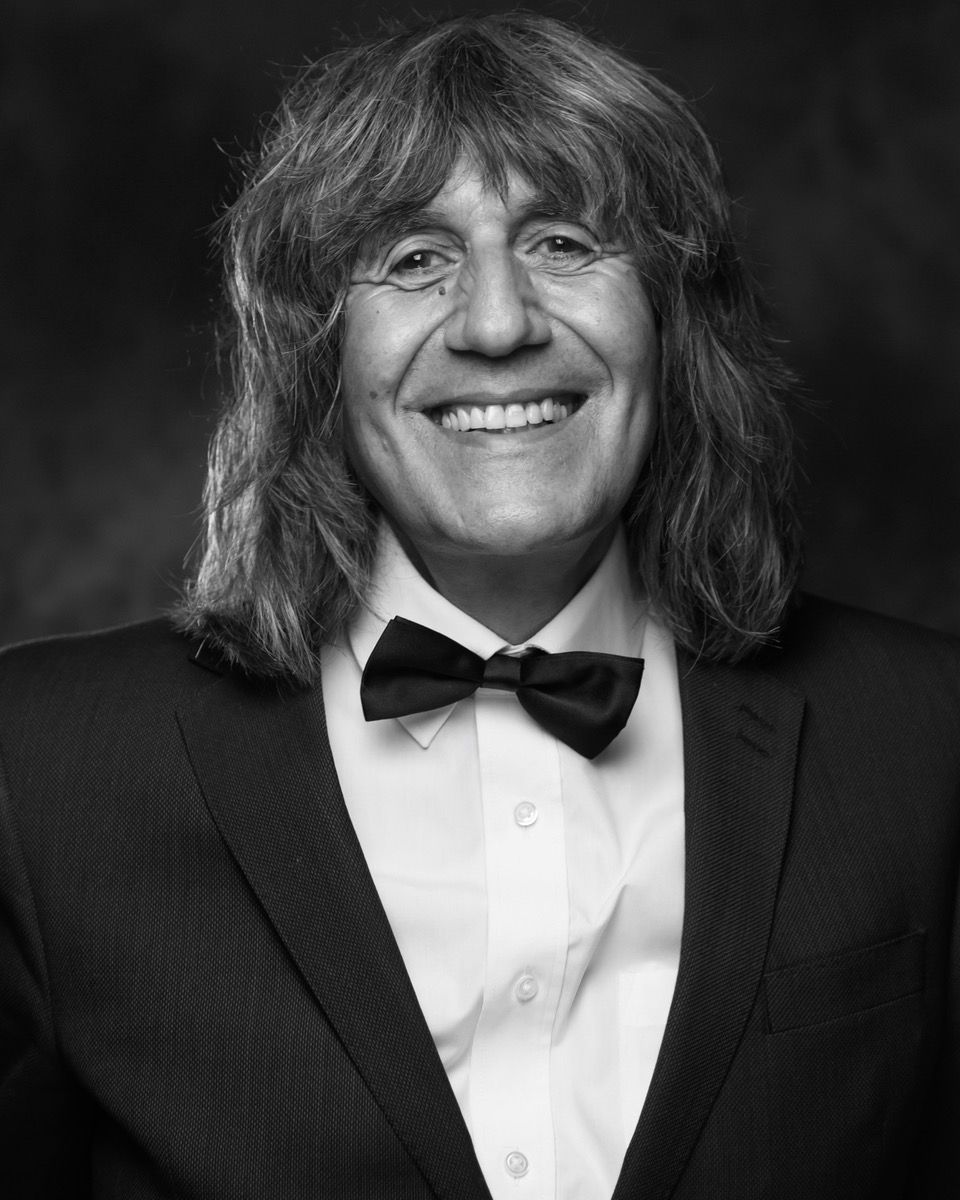

Background information
- Born: Polo Osvaldo Ernesto Piatti; 25 January 1954 (age 72)
- Genre: Melodic Classical
- Occupation: Composer
- Instrument: Piano
- Years active: 1972–present
- Spouse: Martina Mars
- Website: www.polopiatti.com

Polo Osvaldo Ernesto Piatti is a British-Argentine neo-romantic composer, concert pianist and conductor based in the United Kingdom. He is one of very few high-profile international musicians concentrating exclusively on the creation, performance and promotion of melodic, universally appealing classical music. His compositions are performed all over the world for their evocative and passionate character. Considered a pioneer performer of classical piano improvisations since his youth, he toured Europe, Asia, North and South America, premiering his own works as a soloist, performing with international orchestras. Piatti is a member of the Royal Society of Musicians of Great Britain, the Ivors Academy and the British Music Society, among others.

== Early life and education ==
Piatti started piano lessons at the age of 3 in Buenos Aires, becoming a concert pianist and classical improviser in his youth. At 12 he was admitted to the Conservatorio Nacional Superior de Música in Buenos Aires, Argentina, and graduated with distinction as Profesor National de Musica. He left South America at the age of sixteen to pursue an international career and continue his music studies in Paris and Berlin, becoming known as a professional composer, arranger, concert pianist, musical director, conductor, singing coach, instrumental teacher, artist developer, artist manager and music publisher in countries including Spain, France, Germany, Austria and Switzerland. Whilst touring as a concert pianist, Piatti gained acclaim for his innovative classical piano improvisations

== Music career ==
A move to the United Kingdom during the early 1990s led to him becoming teacher and Head of Music at the Italia Conti Academy of Theatre Arts. Piatti co-founded the drama school Die Freie Kleintheaterschule with the late Frieder Nögge during 1996 in Stuttgart, Germany, writing and performing a variety of plays with the school. Around this time, he also worked with the French avant-garde video artist Didier Bay at the 'DAAD Academy' in Berlin. After spending a number of years in London coaching and developing other artists, Piatti returned to his roots, composing and performing his own works

Settling in Hastings, East Sussex, he was appointed 'Composer in Residence' at St Mary in the Castle - a former church in Hastings that became a performance space. A tour of Japan followed in November 2012, premiering the work 'Sentimental Journey' with the Osaka Concert Orchestra, giving classical piano improvisations concerts in Osaka and Tokyo.

Following the tour of Japan, he inaugurated the International Composers Festival during 2012 in Hastings, East Sussex, United Kingdom. Collaborations with the Bolshoi's eminent choreographer Yury Grigorovich and the late prima ballerina Natalia Bessmertnova as Director of Music of the World Centre of Performing Arts followed Piatti also founded the Hastings Sinfonia Orchestra in 2012, becoming Artistic Director.

After launching a recording of Sentimental Journey in 2016, engineered and produced by Grammy Award winner Jan Holzner alongside James Fitzpatrick, Piatti performed with and conducted from the piano the City of Prague Philharmonic Orchestra. In 2016, a collaboration with British screenwriter/dramatist Roy Apps on his first opera 'Mata Hari' took place; the opera being based on the life of the First World War spy and dancer of the same name. In 2017, he opened the Opus Theatre in Hastings, the theatre providing a versatile performance space for all forms of theatre and music.

On 13 October 2019, Piatti's Bohemian Concerto for piano and orchestra was premiered by Steinway pianist Thomas Pandolfi with the Symphonicity Orchestra under conductor Daniel W. Boothe to a standing ovation at the Sandler's Centre for Performing Arts in Virginia Beach, Virginia, USA.

On 20 May 2022, Piatti's Old World Concerto for Violoncello and Orchestra, a privately commissioned work, was world-premiered by cellist Tim Posner together with the International Festival Orchestra conducted by John Andrews. at the De La Warr Pavilion in Bexhill-on-Sea, UK .

On 20 November 2022, Piatti's Libera Nos, the world's first ever multi-faith oratorio, received its world premiere at the De La Warr Pavilion, in Bexhill-on-Sea, United Kingdom. It was written for five solo singers, mixed choir, children's choir and full symphony orchestra. Performers included the London Mozart Players and the Hastings Sinfonia Orchestra, conducted by Derek Carden.

On 3 December 2023, Piatti's Christmas Concerto for Guitar and Orchestra was premiered by guitarist Giulio Tampalini and the Hastings Sinfonia Orchestra under Derek Carden at the De La Warr Pavilion.

In September 2025, Piatti released a recording of his Old World Concerto for Violoncello and Orchestra, with soloist Justin Pearson and John Andrews conducting the National Symphony Orchestra.

In April 2026, the play Dear Cathy premiered at the Bread and Roses Theatre, London. Piatti was commissioned by British author and playwright John Brindley to compose the original music. The production was also performed at the Edinburgh Festival Fringe in August 2026.

On 19 September 2026, Piatti's full-length ballet Ismanien received its world premiere at the Dawn Center in Osaka, Japan. The complete Ismanien score was recorded by the Polyphonic Symphony Orchestra and released by Seafront Records on 1 September 2026. The Osaka production was enthusiastically received, including a prolonged standing ovation at the world premiere.

== Selected works ==
The Tides of Time: An orchestral suite. The soundtrack album was released on the Seafront Records label in 2009.

Sentimental Journey: An orchestral suite containing 11 symphonic works. The album was released on Seafront Records in 2016.

The Impossible Pieces: This work received its world premiere during the opening concert of the 4th International Composers Festival in the United Kingdom in 2018, and the work was published by Goodmusic Publishing in 2020.

Vintage Piano: This is a solo album with classical piano improvisations performed by Polo Piatti. The album was released on the Artful Recorded Music Library label in 2019.

The Birds: A work for flute and piano privately commissioned to be premiered by flautist Daisy Noton, who performed the piece with pianist Oliver Poole. The work was published in 2020 by Goodmusic Publishing.

Argentine Dances: A set of 14 symphonic dances, published in 2021 by Goodmusic Publishing.

Entangled Miniatures: Set of 12 miniatures for piano quartet (violin, viola, violoncello and piano). The work was recorded by the Phacelia Ensemble and released in 2022. Released on Seafront Records in 2021. On 20 October, the art video was officially launched at Hastings Contemporary. The work was given its world premiere at the 5th International Composers Festival on 21 May 21st 2022 in the UK by Tim Crawford (violin), Timng-Ru-Lai (viola), Tim Posner (cello) and Sam Armstrong (piano).

Christmas Concerto for Guitar and Orchestra: The work was recorded with guitarist Sergio Puccini and the Budapest Scoring Symphonic Orchestra. The album was released on Seafront Records in 2021. Premiered on 3 December 2023 by guitarist Giulio Tampalini and the Hastings Sinfonia Orchestra under Derek Carden at the De La Warr Pavilion in Bexhill-on-Sea.

Duty Sublime: The work was privately commissioned to be presented to the late Queen Elizabeth II and was published in 2020 by Goodmusic Publishing and later recorded by the Budapest Scoring Symphony Orchestra under Hungarian conductor Péter Illényi. The album was released on Seafront Records in March 2022.

Old World Concerto for Violoncello and Orchestra: A privately commissioned work world-premiered by cellist Tim Posner together with the International Festival Orchestra conducted by John Andrews. The performance took place at the De La Warr Pavilion in Bexhill-on-Sea, in the UK, on 20 May 2022. A recording of the concerto with soloist Justin Pearson (cello) and John Andrews conducting the National Symphony Orchestra was released in September 2025.

Libera Nos: This is the world's first-ever multi-faith oratorio. Composed for five solo singers, mixed choir, children's choir and full symphony orchestra. The work's world premiere took place on 20 November 2022 at the De La Warr Pavilion, in Bexhill-on-Sea, United Kingdom, and performers included the London Mozart Players and the Hastings Sinfonia Orchestra, conducted by Derek Carden. The oratorio was commissioned by Mr Peter Armstrong Dip. Theo on behalf of the Musica Sacra organisation, UK.

Bohemian Concerto for Piano and Orchestra: Premiere by pianist Thomas Pandolfi and the Symphonicity-Symphony Orchestra under maestro Daniel W Boothe at the Sandlers Centre for Performing Arts in Virginia Beach in the United States on 23 October 2019. Recorded by pianist Thomas Pandolfi and the National Symphony Orchestra conducted by John Andrews. Released on Seafront Records in October 2023.

Dear Cathy - 2026: Piatti was commissioned by British author and playwright John Brindley to compose the original music for his play Dear Cathy. The production premiered on 21 April 2026 at the Bread and Roses Theatre in London and was also performed at the Edinburgh Festival Fringe in August 2026.

Ismanien: Piatti's full-length ballet Ismanien received its world premiere in Osaka, Japan. The complete score was recorded by the Polyphonic Symphony Orchestra and released by Seafront Records.

== Interviews and media ==
Piatti interviewed by Robert Miller for the Follow Your Dream podcast, released on 25th Sept 2026. The episode covers Piatti's life and career as a composer, pianist and conductor, and includes a selection of his music.

Review by Andy Hemsley of CD release Old World Concerto for Cello and Orchestra, Sussex World, 17th Nov 2025

Piatti interviewed by Phil Hewitt about the release of the Old World Concerto, Sussex World, 29th Aug 2025

Video of the recording session of the Bohemian Concerto for Piano and Orchestra

Hastings composer Polo Piatti releases his Bohemian Concerto (October 2023)

Interview with Get Hastings magazine. October 2023

Busy summer for Hastings-based composer Polo Piatti, Sussex World, June 2023

Piatti prepares for world premiere of his multi-faith oratorio, Hastings Online Times, November 2022

Polo's Dream, 2022 film about the creation of the International Composers Festival

Video of the recording session of Duty Sublime in Budapest, released on Seafront Records in March 2022

== Selected Recordings ==
The Tides Of Time Orchestral Suite Soundtracks (2009)

Sentimental Journey Orchestral Suite Soundtracks (2016)

Entangled Miniatures for Piano Quartet - recorded by Phacelia Ensemble conducted by Polo Piatti (2021)

Duty Sublime for Symphony Orchestra - recorded by Budapest Scoring Symphonic Orchestra, Polo Piatti (piano), conducted by Peter Illenyi (2022)

Christmas Concerto for Guitar & Orchestra - Recorded by Budapest Scoring Symphonic Orchestra, Sergio Puccini (guitar), Peter Illenyi (conductor) (2022)

Bohemian Concerto for piano & orchestra - recorded by National Symphony Orchestra, Thomas Pandolfi (piano), conducted by John Andrews (2023)

Old World Concerto for Cello & Orchestra recorded by National Symphony Orchestra, Justin Pearson (violoncello), conducted by John Andrews (2025)

Argentine Dances fourteen symphonic dances for full symphony orchestra - recorded by Polyphonic Symphony Orchestra (2025)

== Professional affiliations ==
Piatti is a Member of the British Academy of Songwriters, Composers and Authors and was elected as a member of the Royal Society of Musicians of Great Britain in February 2016.
