= Matthew Curtis (composer) =

British classical composer

- Born: 1959 (age 66–67); Cumbria, England
- Occupation: Composer

Matthew Curtis (born 1959 in Cumbria, England) is a British classical composer.

== Life and career ==
Matthew Curtis was born in Cumbria, England in 1959. He is essentially self-taught as a composer and orchestrator. While he was a student at Worcester College, Oxford reading Classics, his work, including a symphony, first began to receive public performance.

On leaving university he was introduced to the late Alan Owen, a composer and BBC Radio staff producer, who took an interest in his music. This led to numerous broadcasts of his work from 1982 onward in the UK, notably BBC Radio, and in several other countries. In 2001 he came to the notice of the composer and record producer Philip Lane, resulting in a significant discography and over 8 hours of music recorded. (Note: As of November 2016, the total run time of all the CDs/Tracks comes to 486 minutes 43 seconds.)

His music has been played in concert by the BBC Concert Orchestra and I Musici de Montréal. and by several non-professional and youth orchestras, most notably the National Children's Orchestras of Great Britain, for which he has composed a number of pieces. Curtis was commissioned to compose for the English Music Festival in 2008, and his Festival Overture opened the final concert of the event.

Curtis is probably best known for his short orchestral pieces in the British light music tradition (he has been seen as part of the "renaissance" of British Light Music and singled out for praise in an article in The Spectator among other things discussing the neglect of light classical music), but his output extends to more substantial works for orchestra, chamber music, songs and choral works. Reviews of his work in Gramophone, on MusicWeb International, an extensive review of his early work by the British Music Society, and other reviews of recordings devoted to his orchestral works in the British Composer Series all draw attention to his emphasis on and mastery of melody and orchestral colouring, and make stylistic references to Edward Elgar, Eric Coates and Haydn Wood among others.

A showcase of his work was given on 21 September 2018 at the Hastings and Bexhill International Composers Festival.

== Recordings ==
=== Devoted to Curtis in the British Composer Series ===
- Paths to Urbino: Orchestral Works Volume I Royal Ballet Sinfonia, Gavin Sutherland Cameo 2015 (2002)
- Orchestral Works Volume II Royal Ballet Sinfonia, Gavin Sutherland Cameo 2035 (2004)
- Orchestral Works Volume III Jennifer Stinton (flute), Verity Butler (clarinet), Royal Ballet Sinfonia, Gavin Sutherland Cameo 2055 (2005)
- Song Cycles Marie Vassiliou (soprano), Gavin Sutherland (piano) Cameo 2060 (2007)
- Orchestral Works Volume IV Royal Ballet Sinfonia, Gavin Sutherland Cameo 2085 (2011)
- Orchestral Works Volume V Royal Ballet Sinfonia, Gavin Sutherland Cameo 2090 (2016) (Note: Campion Cameo, issued by Disc Imports Limited, trading as DI Music)

=== Other recordings ===
- Serenade (in three movements) Royal Ballet Sinfonia, Gavin Sutherland included in British String Miniatures 2 ASV White Line WHL 2136 (2003)
- Open Road Royal Ballet Sinfonia, Gavin Sutherland included in British Light Overtures 3 ASV White Line WHL 2140 (2003)
- Irish Lullaby Verity Butler (clarinet), Gavin Sutherland (piano) included in Clarinet Kaleidoscope Vol 2 Cameo 2058 (2007)
- Christmas Rush RTÉ Concert Orchestra, Gavin Sutherland included in Another Night Before Christmas and Scrooge Naxos 8.572744 (2011)
- Christmas Spirit RTÉ Concert Orchestra, Gavin Sutherland included in The Spirit of Christmas Heritage HTGCD299 (2015)
- A Festival Overture BBC Concert Orchestra, Owain Arwel Hughes included in Now Comes Beauty EM Records CD037 (2016)
