= Salehurst =

Village in East Sussex, England

Coordinates: 50.99°N 0.48°E

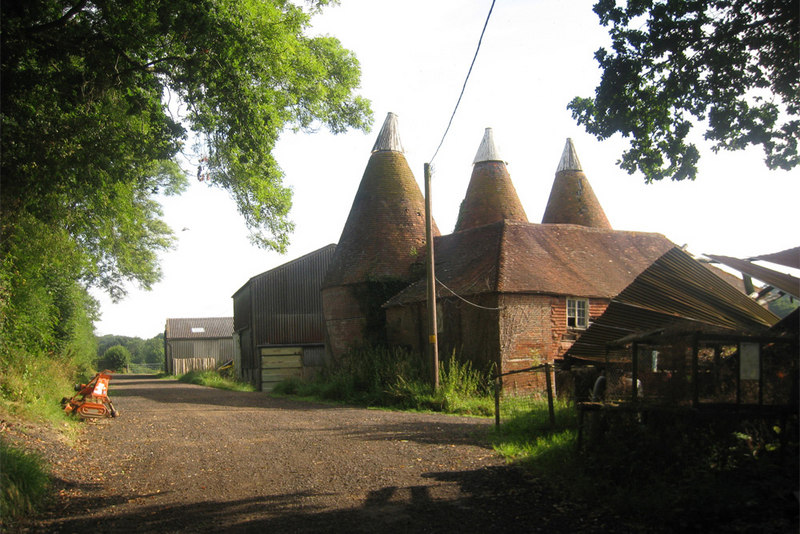
- Oast house near Parsonage Farm, Bocks Hill

- Location within East Sussex
- OS grid reference: TQ741242
  - London: 44 miles (71 km) NW
- Civil parish: Salehurst and Robertsbridge
- District: Rother
- Shire county: East Sussex
- Region: South East
- Country: England
- Sovereign state: United Kingdom
- Post town: ROBERTSBRIDGE
- Postcode district: TN32
- Dialling code: 01580
- Police: Sussex
- Fire: East Sussex
- Ambulance: South East Coast
- UK Parliament: Bexhill and Battle

Salehurst is a village in the Rother district of East Sussex, England, within the civil parish of Salehurst and Robertsbridge. It lies immediately to the north-east of the larger village of Robertsbridge, on a minor road; it is approximately thirteen miles (21 km) north of Hastings, just east of the A21 road.

In historical terms, Salehurst is much older than its neighbour; before the bridge over the River Rother was built, it already existed, and it is named in the Domesday Book of 1086. At the time, the river crossing was by ford or ferry, but in the 12th century, a newly established order of Cistercian monks constructed the bridge, and the two settlements of Robertsbridge and Northbridge Street came into being; eventually, since the main road now bypassed the village, they became much more important than Salehurst.

Salehurst lies approximately three miles from Bodiam, Sussex, the site of Bodiam Castle. One owner of Bodiam Castle was the Levett family, who lived at Salehurst during their 'occupation' of the castle. In 1588, John Levett of Salehurst contributed to the Armada loan, and in 1607, his sons John and Thomas of Salehurst were regranted by the College of Arms their right to the Levett coat of arms issued to their Sussex ancestors.

John Colepeper, 1st Baron Colepeper (c. 1600–1660), was an English peer, military officer, and politician who, as Chancellor of the Exchequer (1642–43) and Master of the Rolls (1643), was an influential counsellor of King Charles I during the English Civil War. His family came from Wigsell in the parish of Salehurst.

== St Mary the Virgin ==
The parish church is dedicated to St. Mary the Virgin. It is reputed to be the largest rural parish church in East Sussex. Alfred Milner, 1st Viscount Milner, KG, GCB, GCMG, PC (1854–1925) is buried in the churchyard. Rev. John Lord (1614–81) was rector from 1640 until his death; in 1937, his descendants donated to the church a portrait of him which had been owned by the family for generations.
