= Sunny Li =

Chinese classical pianist (born 1991)

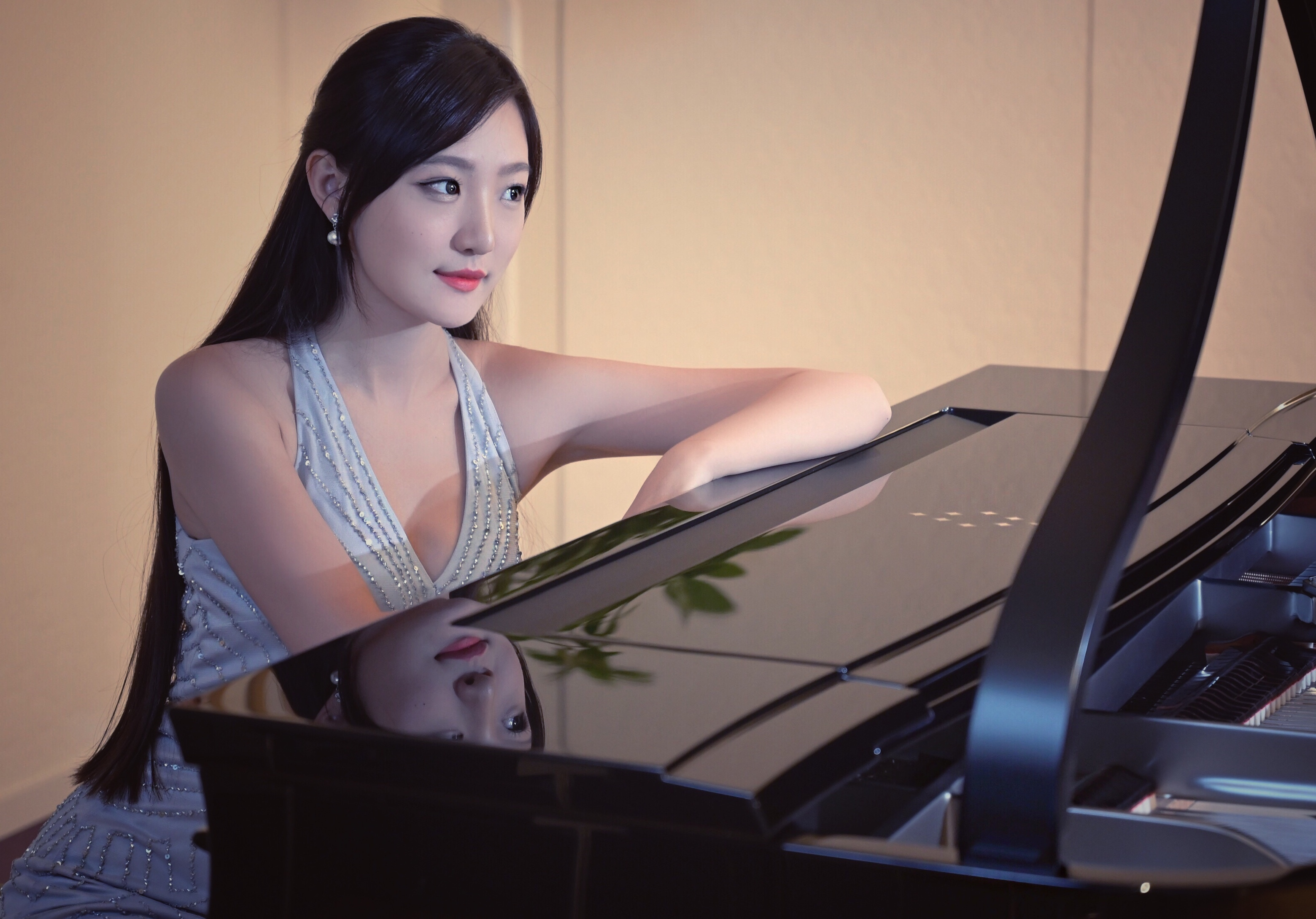
- Born: 李昀 (Li Yun); September 4, 1991 (age 33); Dalian, China
- Occupation: Concert pianist
- Years active: 1997–present
- Spouse: Zhang Yijia
- Website: https://www.sunnylipiano.com/ at the Wayback Machine (archived 5 December 2020)

Sunny Li
- Simplified Chinese: 李昀
Transcriptions
Standard Mandarin
- Hanyu Pinyin: Lǐ Yún

Li Yun (Chinese: 李昀; pinyin: Lǐ Yún), popularly known as Sunny Li, is a Chinese concert pianist. Based in London, Li studied at the Royal Academy of Music and Royal Northern College of Music prior to performing at venues around Europe.

== Biography ==
In 2011, Sunny Li released a piano solo album 昀韵 (yún yùn), which included works from composers such as Frédéric Chopin, Franz Liszt and Moritz Moszkowski. She performed at the Steinway-Haus in Munich, Germany with fellow pianist Assel Abilseitova the same year.

In September 2014, Li founded the Migjorn Quartet, which placed third in the Hirsh Prize Chamber Music Competition. In January 2017, Li played "Flight of the Bumblebee" on two pianos at the same time. The video, posted on Facebook by Classic FM, garnered over a million views with mixed reactions from viewers.

== Awards ==
- 2007 – The Third Rising Star International Piano Competition, "Gold Award"
- 2013 – Schoenfeld International Piano Competition, "Elite Award"
- 2015 – British Royal Northern College of Music Concerto Competition, Winner
- 2016 – Grand Prize Virtuoso International Music Competition, Second place
- 56th Grotrain-Steinweg Schumann International Competition, Winner
- 59th French International Music Festival, France, French Nice Festival Solo Awards
