= Salehurst and Robertsbridge =

Civil parish in East Sussex, England

Coordinates: 50.99°N 0.48°E

Salehurst & Robertsbridge
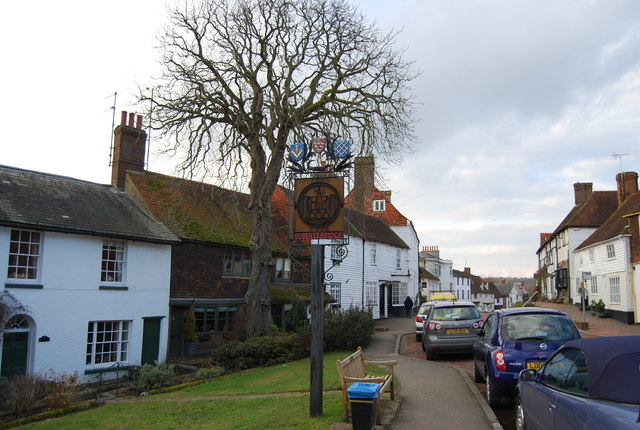
- Robertsbridge

- Location within East Sussex
- Area: 18.2 km^{2} (7.0 sq mi)
- Population: 2,726 (Parish-2021)
  - Density: 369/sq mi (142/km^{2})
- OS grid reference: TQ741242
  - London: 44 miles (71 km) NW
- District: Rother
- Shire county: East Sussex
- Region: South East
- Country: England
- Sovereign state: United Kingdom
- Post town: ROBERTSBRIDGE
- Postcode district: TN32
- Dialling code: 01580
- Police: Sussex
- Fire: East Sussex
- Ambulance: South East Coast
- UK Parliament: Bexhill and Battle
- Website: http://www.salehurst-pc.org.uk/

Salehurst and Robertsbridge is a civil parish in the Rother district, in the county of East Sussex, England. The parish lies entirely within an Area of Outstanding Natural Beauty (AONB). In 2021 the parish had a population of 2726.

The parish includes the villages of Robertsbridge, Salehurst and Northbridge Street.

On 1 April 2000 the parish was renamed from "Salehurst" to "Salehurst & Robertsbridge".

== Governance ==
Salehurst and Robertsbridge are part of the electoral ward called Salehurst. The population of this ward at the 2011 Census was 4,602
