= Robertsbridge =

Village in East Sussex, England

Coordinates: 50.99°N 0.47°E

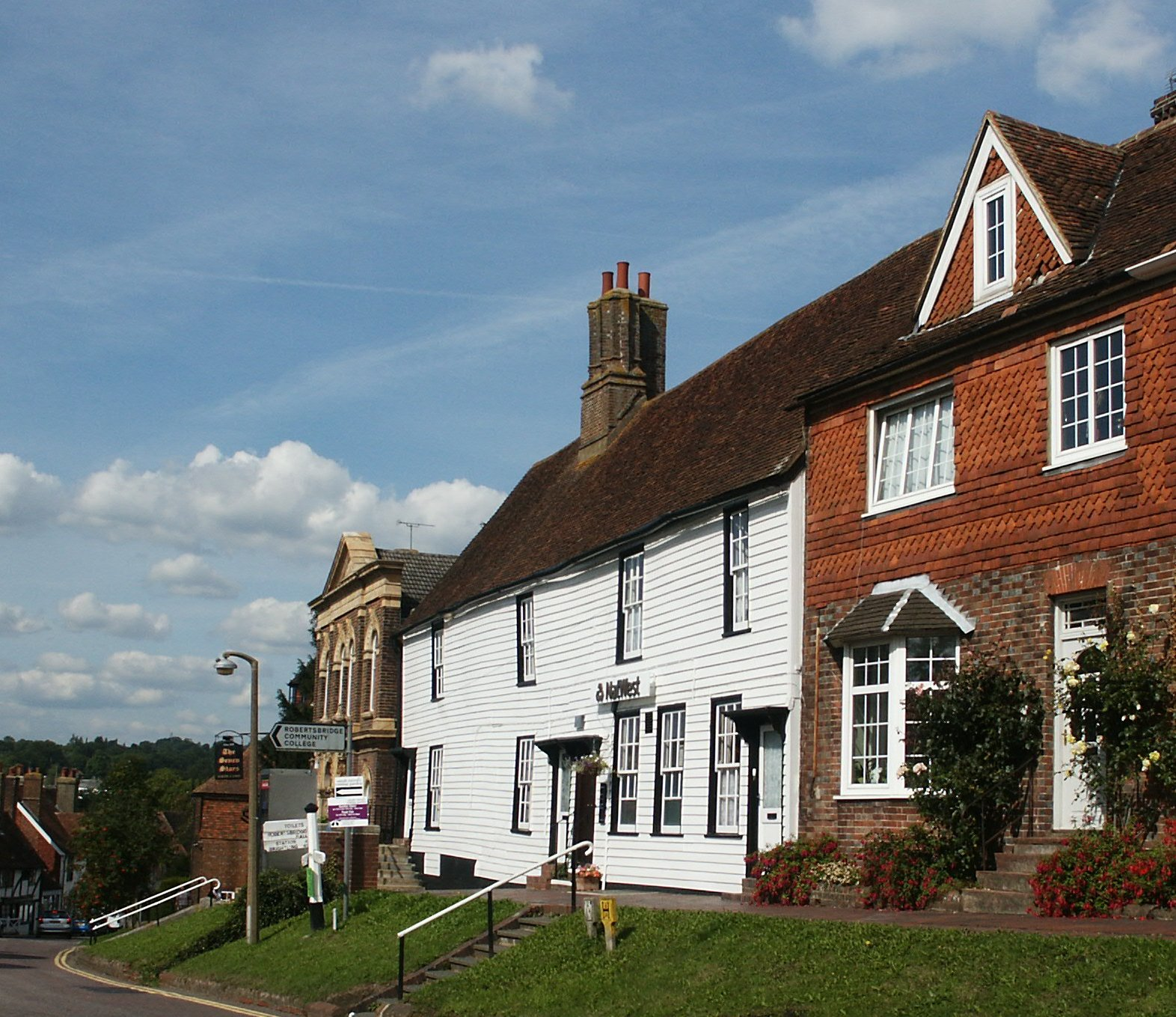
- View of High Street

- Location within East Sussex
- Area: 18.15 km^{2} (7.01 sq mi)
- Population: 1,436 (2021 Census)
  - Density: 79/km^{2} (200/sq mi)
- OS grid reference: TQ737235
  - London: 44 miles (71 km) NW
- Civil parish: Salehurst and Robertsbridge
- District: Rother
- Shire county: East Sussex
- Region: South East
- Country: England
- Sovereign state: United Kingdom
- Post town: ROBERTSBRIDGE
- Postcode district: TN32
- Dialling code: 01580
- Police: Sussex
- Fire: East Sussex
- Ambulance: South East Coast
- UK Parliament: Bexhill and Battle
- Website: Salehurst and Robertsbridge Parish Council

Robertsbridge is a village in the civil parish of Salehurst and Robertsbridge, and the Rother district of East Sussex, England. It is approximately 10 miles (16 km) north of Hastings and 13 miles (21 km) south-east of Royal Tunbridge Wells. It had a population of 1,436 at the 2021 census. The River Rother passes through the village.

== History ==
The village is thought to date back to 1176 when a Cistercian abbey was founded there by the Abbot, Robert de St Martin. When a market charter was granted in 1198 by Richard I to Robertsbridge (Pons Roberti in Latin) it was the first recorded use of the name. The abbey was dissolved in 1538; however, the town flourished, and many of the oldest existing houses in the village date from the 14th and 15th centuries, including The Seven Stars Inn in the High Street. From the village was discovered the Robertsbridge Codex (1360), a music manuscript from the 14th century. It contains the earliest surviving music written specifically for keyboard.

== Transport ==
Robertsbridge Railway Station is on the main railway line from Hastings to London, and the A21 trunk road. The Robertsbridge bypass opened in 1989.

== Education ==
Robertsbridge Community College, a specialist mathematics and computer college, is the smallest such in the county of East Sussex. Salehurst Church of England Primary School is also located in the village.

== Community facilities ==
Robertsbridge cultural organizations include Robertsbridge Arts Partnership (RAP], a Jazz Club and Robertsbridge Wine Club (RWC) which is affiliated to the Eureka natural wine society Sports clubs include Robertsbridge Cricket Club. and formerly Robertsbridge Rugby Football Club, which disbanded in the 2008-2009 season. Robertsbridge has a bonfire society. Health facilities are limited and residents often have to travel to London for hospital consultations.

== Economy ==
Robertsbridge is the home to several notable sporting equipment brands. Parent company Grays International have been based in Robertsbridge since moving from Cambridgeshire in the 1990s. The company makes cricket equipment under the Gray-Nicolls brand, netball and rugby equipment as Gilbert, and hockey equipment as Grays.

== Religion ==
The former Robertsbridge United Reformed Church, a Grade II-listed chapel built in 1881, stands on the High Street. The former Bethel Strict Baptist Chapel, built in 1842 and also listed Grade II, is nearby. A residential Bruderhof community, known as Darvell, is located on the outskirts of the village.

== Notable people ==
People who have lived in Robertsbridge include educationalist and women's rights activist Barbara Bodichon, journalist Malcolm Muggeridge,, model Heather Mills, and footballer Sam Jennings who died there in 1944.

== Demography ==
Population Salehurst and Robertsbridge Parish CP
| 2001 UK Census | Count |
| All people | 2624 |
| All males | 1271 |
| All females | 1353 |
| People aged 0–4 | 169 |
| People aged 5–15 | 415 |
| People aged 16–24 | 229 |
| People aged 25–44 | 684 |
| People aged 45–64 | 675 |
| People aged 65–74 | 251 |
| People aged 75 and over | 201 |

The demographics above are drawn from the National Statistics Office, 2001 Census. As data is not available for Robertsbridge in isolation, the table includes the entire parish of Salehurst and Robertsbridge.

Ethnic and Religious Breakdown for Salehurst Ward, compared by percentage
| 2001 UK Census | Salehurst Ward | Rother District | South East England | England |
| White | 98.48 | 98.11 | 95.1 | 90.92 |
| Mixed | 0.75 | 0.62 | 1.07 | 1.31 |
| Asian | 0.11 | 0.44 | 2.33 | 4.57 |
| Black | 0.25 | 0.19 | 0.71 | 2.3 |
| Chinese | 0.41 | 1.73 | 0.78 | 0.89 |
| Christian | 77.55 | 76.5 | 72.78 | 71.74 |
| Buddhist | 0.18 | 0.18 | 0.28 | 0.28 |
| Hindu | 0.07 | 0.14 | 0.56 | 1.11 |
| Jewish | 0.11 | 0.15 | 0.24 | 0.52 |
| Muslim | 0.11 | 0.64 | 1.36 | 3.1 |
| Sikh | 0.09 | 0.03 | 0.47 | 0.67 |
| Other religions | 0.33 | 0.35 | 0.36 | 0.29 |
| No religion | 13.89 | 13.91 | 16.5 | 14.59 |
| Religion not stated | 7.67 | 8.1 | 7.46 | 7.69 |

As data for the table above is not available for Robertsbridge in isolation, it is drawn from the Salehurst Ward which covers a larger area including Salehurst, Robertsbridge and Bodiam.

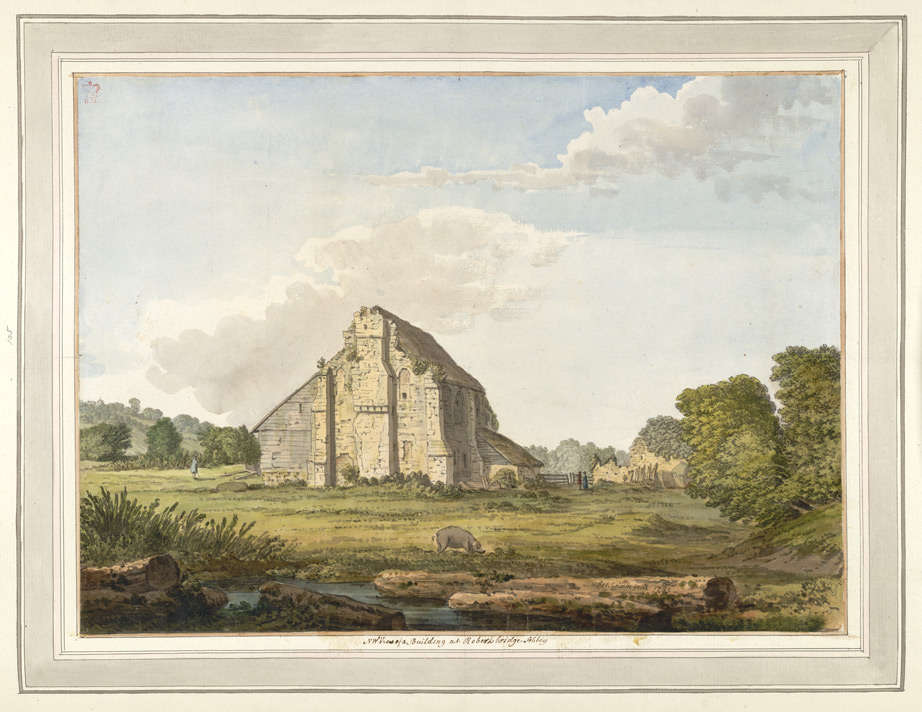
Ruins of the Robertsbridge Abbey, 1783

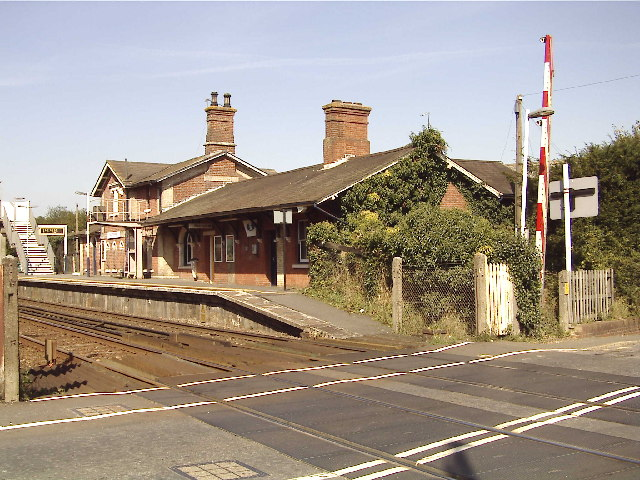
Robertsbridge station and level crossing

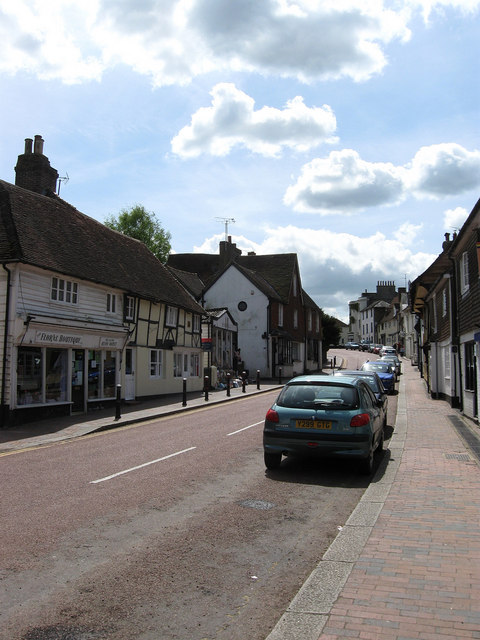
The High Street

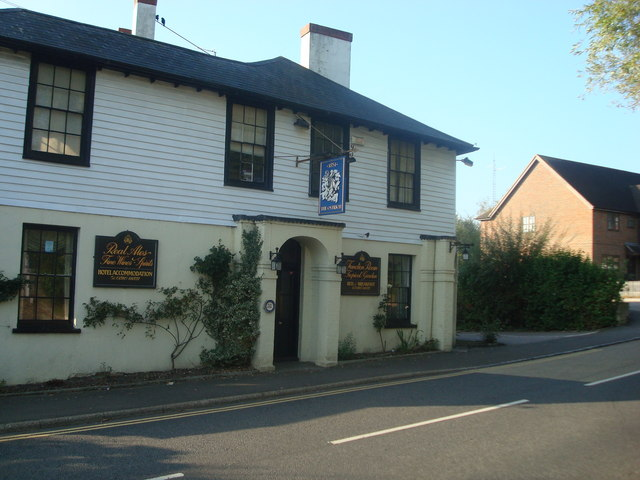
The Ostrich public house

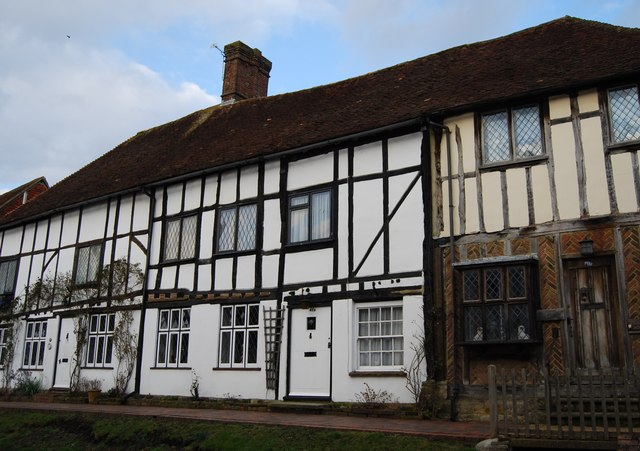
Half timbered cottages in the High Street

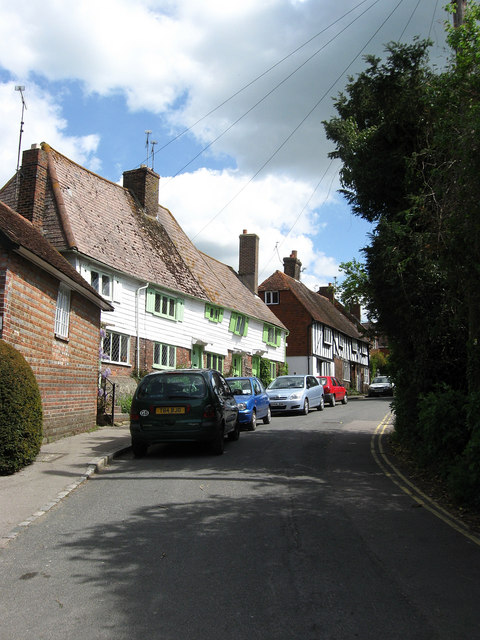
Cottages in Fair Lane
